= 2024–25 Premiership Women's Rugby =

Season in English women's rugby union

- Countries: England
- Number of teams: 9
- Date: 5 October 2024 – 16 March 2025
- Champions: Gloucester–Hartpury (3rd title)
- Runners-up: Saracens
- Matches played: 75
- Highest attendance: 18,055 – Harlequins v Leicester (28 December 2024)
- Tries scored: 671 (average 8.9 per match)
- Top point scorer: (England) Emma Sing (Gloucester–Hartpury) – 163 points
- Top try scorer: (England) May Campbell (Saracens) (England) Millie David (Bristol) – 17 tries

Official website
- www.thepwr.com

The 2024–25 Premiership Women's Rugby was the eighth season of the top-flight domestic women's rugby union club competition in England. It was the second season to be branded as Premiership Women's Rugby.

The reigning champions entering the season were Gloucester–Hartpury, who claimed their second league title after winning the 2024 final against Bristol Bears Women.

== Teams and locations ==
The 2024–25 edition of Premiership Women's Rugby was contested by the same nine clubs which started the 2023–24 season. No team was brought in to replace Worcester Warriors, who withdrew from the league shortly before the beginning of the previous season.

Locations of the Premiership Women's Rugby teams competing in the 2024–25 season
Locations of the Premiership Women's Rugby teams in Greater London

Club	Director of Rugby/ Head coach	Captain(s)	Stadium(s)	Capacity	Location
Bristol Bears Women	(England) Dave Ward	(England) Amber Reed (England) Abbie Ward	Shaftesbury Park	—	Bristol
Bristol Bears Women	(England) Dave Ward	(England) Amber Reed (England) Abbie Ward	Ashton Gate	27,000	Bristol
Exeter Chiefs Women	(England) Susie Appleby	(England) Poppy Leitch	Sandy Park	13,593	Exeter, Devon
Gloucester–Hartpury	(Wales) Sean Lynn	(England) Zoe Aldcroft (England) Natasha Hunt	Hartpury Stadium	2,000	Hartpury, Gloucestershire
Gloucester–Hartpury	(Wales) Sean Lynn	(England) Zoe Aldcroft (England) Natasha Hunt	Kingsholm	16,115	Gloucester, Gloucestershire
Harlequins Women	(England) Ross Chisholm	(Scotland) Jade Konkel-Roberts	Twickenham Stoop	14,800	Twickenham, Greater London
Leicester Tigers Women	(England) Tom Hudson	(England) Natasha Jones	Welford Road	25,849	Leicester, Leicestershire
Loughborough Lightning	(England) Nathan Smith	(Scotland) Rachel Malcolm	Franklin's Gardens	14,249	Northampton, Northamptonshire
Sale Sharks Women	(Wales) Rachel Taylor	(Ireland) Lauren Delany (United States) Georgie Perris-Redding	Heywood Road	3,387	Sale, Greater Manchester
Saracens Women	(England) Alex Austerberry	(England) Marlie Packer (United States) Lotte Sharp	StoneX Stadium	10,500	Hendon, Greater London
Trailfinders Women	(England) Barney Maddison	(United States) Kate Zackary	Trailfinders Sports Ground	4,000	West Ealing, Greater London

== Table ==
2024–25 Premiership Women's Rugby table
Pos	Team	Pld	W	D	L	PF	PA	PD	TF	TA	TB	LB	Pts	Qualification
1	Gloucester–Hartpury (Q)	16	13	0	3	569	329	+240	90	50	14	2	68	Play-offs
2	Saracens (Q)	16	12	0	4	608	321	+287	92	51	12	2	62	Play-offs
3	Harlequins (Q)	16	11	0	5	446	359	+87	73	56	10	1	55	Play-offs
4	Bristol Bears (Q)	16	10	0	6	556	379	+177	89	61	12	1	53	Play-offs
5	Exeter Chiefs	16	10	0	6	408	354	+54	64	55	9	2	51	
6	Loughborough Lightning	16	7	0	9	446	463	−17	69	73	9	2	39	
7	Trailfinders	16	5	0	11	495	524	−29	79	83	12	4	36	
8	Leicester Tigers	16	3	0	13	310	697	−387	48	108	5	1	18	
9	Sale Sharks	16	1	0	15	224	636	−412	35	102	0	0	4	

Updated to match(es) played on 21 February 2025. Source: Premiership Women's Rugby
Rules for classification: Tiebreakers for teams tied on points: 1) Number of matches won; 2) Difference between points for and against; 3) Total number of points for; 4) Aggregate number of points scored in matches between tied teams; 5) Number of matches won excluding the first match, then the second and so on until the tie is settled.
(Q) Qualified for the phase indicated

=== Round-by-round progression ===
The grid below shows each team's progression throughout the season, indicating their points total (and league table position) at the end of every round:

Team Progression
Team	R1	R2	R3	R4	R5	R6	R7	R8	R9	R10	R11	R12	R13	R14	R15	R16	R17	R18
Gloucester–Hartpury	5 (1st)	10 (2nd)	11 (3rd)	12 (3rd)	17 (3rd)	22 (2nd)	22 (3rd)	23 (5th)	28 (3rd)	33 (3rd)	38 (3rd)	43 (2nd)	48 (1st)	53 (1st)	53 (1st)	58 (1st)	63 (1st)	68 (1st)
Saracens	5 (3rd)	10 (1st)	15 (1st)	20 (1st)	20 (2nd)	20 (4th)	21 (5th)	26 (3rd)	31 (2nd)	32 (4th)	37 (4th)	38 (4th)	43 (3rd)	43 (4th)	48 (3rd)	53 (3rd)	57 (2nd)	62 (2nd)
Harlequins	1 (5th)	1 (6th)	6 (6th)	11 (5th)	16 (4th)	21 (3rd)	25 (2nd)	30 (2nd)	30 (3rd)	35 (2nd)	40 (1st)	45 (1st)	46 (2nd)	50 (2nd)	50 (2nd)	55 (2nd)	55 (3rd)	55 (3rd)
Bristol Bears	5 (2nd)	5 (5th)	6 (5th)	11 (4th)	11 (5th)	16 (5th)	21 (4th)	25 (4th)	25 (Note: The match between Bristol Bears and Exeter Chiefs was postponed from its original scheduled date of 7 December 2024 to 8 February 2025, due to adverse weather conditions caused by Storm Darragh.) (5th)	30 (5th)	31 (5th)	31 (5th)	36 (5th)	41 (5th)	43 (5th)	49 (4th)	53 (4th)	53 (4th)
Exeter Chiefs	4 (4th)	9 (3rd)	13 (2nd)	18 (2nd)	23 (1st)	28 (1st)	33 (1st)	33 (1st)	33 (1st)	38 (1st)	38 (2nd)	38 (3rd)	39 (4th)	43 (3rd)	44 (4th)	46 (5th)	46 (5th)	51 (5th)
Loughborough Lightning	0 (9th)	1 (7th)	6 (7th)	7 (6th)	7 (7th)	7 (7th)	12 (6th)	12 (7th)	12 (7th)	13 (7th)	18 (7th)	23 (6th)	23 (6th)	24 (6th)	29 (6th)	34 (6th)	34 (6th)	39 (6th)
Trailfinders	1 (6th)	6 (4th)	6 (4th)	6 (7th)	11 (6th)	11 (6th)	11 (7th)	12 (6th)	17 (6th)	18 (6th)	18 (6th)	20 (7th)	20 (Note: The match between Sale Sharks and Trailfinders was postponed from its original scheduled date of 12 January 2025 to 8 February 2025, due to adverse weather conditions.) (7th)	22 (7th)	27 (7th)	32 (7th)	34 (7th)	36 (7th)
Leicester Tigers	1 (7th)	1 (8th)	1 (8th)	1 (8th)	1 (8th)	1 (8th)	1 (8th)	6 (8th)	6 (8th)	6 (8th)	6 (8th)	11 (8th)	11 (8th)	12 (8th)	12 (8th)	12 (8th)	17 (8th)	18 (8th)
Sale Sharks	0 (8th)	0 (9th)	0 (9th)	0 (9th)	0 (9th)	0 (9th)	0 (9th)	0 (9th)	0 (9th)	0 (9th)	0 (9th)	0 (9th)	0 (9th)	0 (9th)	4 (9th)	4 (9th)	4 (9th)	4 (9th)
Updated: 21 February 2025

Key
Win	Draw	Loss	Bye

== Regular season ==
The season format was announced on 18 June 2024. The schedule is shortened from the previous season, to give national team players more time to rest and prepare for the 2025 Rugby World Cup.

=== Results ===
Home \ Away	BRI	EXE	GLO	HAR	LEI	LOU	SAL	SAR	TRA
Bristol Bears	—	45–17	17–40	19–34	43–29	22–31	54–19	24–41	26–7
Exeter Chiefs	31–41	—	12–41	30–31	52–10	40–19	7–12	29–12	36–25
Gloucester–Hartpury	14–19	15–21	—	52–12	57–29	36–19	27–14	47–31	33–31
Harlequins	10–19	7–8	18–27	—	42–17	22–19	38–7	10–33	47–26
Leicester Tigers	7–62	19–24	7–38	17–31	—	12–61	38–17	5–38	17–36
Loughborough Lightning	19–46	15–19	7–31	22–40	36–24	—	36–17	22–17	36–34
Sale Sharks	10–57	19–29	24–41	10–43	17–34	7–50	—	14–52	20–33
Saracens	33–24	21–12	49–38	14–15	100–0	32–21	66–14	—	38–29
Trailfinders	39–38	22–41	19–32	39–46	43–45	64–33	31–5	17–31	—

Updated to match(es) played on 21 February 2025. Source: Premiership Women's Rugby
Legend: Blue = home team win; Yellow = draw; Red = away team win.

=== Round 1 ===
5 October 2024
14:00

(1 BP) Saracens	38–29	Trailfinders (1 BP)
Try: Campbell 6' c Miell 12' m Gondwe 33' c P. Cleall 51' c Field 67' m McKenna 79' c Con: MacDougall (4/6) 7', 35', 53', 80'	Report	Try: Laflin (3) 1' c, 18' m, 74' c Boatman 60' c Con: Taylor (3/4) 3', 61' 75'; Pen: Taylor (1/1) 48'

StoneX Stadium
Referee: George Selwood

5 October 2024
15:00

(1 BP) Harlequins	7–8	Exeter Chiefs
Try: Whythe 12' c Con: Cromack (1/1) 13'	Report	Try: Bricknell 64' m Pen: McGoverne (1/1) 80+1'

Twickenham Stoop
Referee: Nikki O'Donnell

5 October 2024
15:00

Loughborough Lightning	19–46	Bristol Bears (1 BP)
Try: Calladine (2) 15' m, 55' c Winter 79' c Con: Green (2/3) 56', 80'	Report	Try: Bonner (3) 3' m, 5' c, 8' m David (3) 13' c, 47' m, 48' c Sprague 19' m Coles 69' m Con: Reed (3/8) 6', 14', 49'

Franklin's Gardens
Referee: Charlie Gayther

6 October 2024
12:45

(1 BP) Gloucester–Hartpury	57–29	Leicester Tigers (1 BP)
Try: Hopkins 19' c Dale (2) 25' m, 40+2' c Sing (2) 35' c, 37' c Lund 54' m Woodman (2) 56' c, 59' m Shekells 63' c Con: Sing (6/9) 20', 36', 38', 40+3', 57', 64'	Report	Try: Fray 3' m Alema 21' c Wills 31' m Beaver (2) 52' m, 65' c Con: Nicholas (1/4) 22'; Mundy (1/1) 66'

Kingsholm
Referee: Mike Hudson

Bye/s: Sale Sharks

=== Round 2 ===
12 October 2024
15:00

Harlequins	18–27	Gloucester–Hartpury (1 BP)
Try: Aucken 31' m Meuller 74' c Con: Cromack (1/2) 75'; Pen: Cromack (2/2) 14', 58'	Report	Try: Dale 2' c Sing 48' m E. Perry 67' m Woodman 70' c Con: Sing (2/4) 3', 71'; Pen: Sing (1/1) 79'

Twickenham Stoop
Referee: Jonathan Cook

12 October 2024
19:00

Sale Sharks	14–52	Saracens (1 BP)
Try: Hopkins 55' c Prothero 67' c Con: V. A. Irwin (2/2) 56', 68'	Report	Try: Gondwe 10' c Campbell 18' c Alejandro 30' c Linkins (2) 35' m, 64' m P. Cleall 45' c Infante 52' c Fitzgerald 71' c Con: MacDougall (6/8) 11', 19', 32', 46', 53', 72'

Heywood Road
Referee: Charlie Gayther

13 October 2024
12:45

(1 BP) Trailfinders	64–33	Loughborough Lightning (1 BP)
Try: Burton 6' m Boatman (2) 9' c, 36' c Cousineau 22' c Meta (2) 31' c, 52' c K. Evans 45' c Laflin 62' m Uren 72' m Barwick 76' c Con: Taylor (7/10) 10', 24', 32', 37', 46', 54', 77'	Report	Try: Morrall 19' m Maude 27' c Hibbert-Jones 39' c A. Williams 51' c Goldthorp 68' c Con: Green (4/5) 28', 39', 52', 68'

Trailfinders Sports Ground
Referee: Hamish Grant

13 October 2024
15:00

(1 BP) Exeter Chiefs	52–10	Leicester Tigers
Try: E. Robinson 5' c F. Robinson 10' c Allen 18' c McGillivray 21' c McGoverne 28' c Jefferies 36' m Nelson 72' c Sinclair 75' m Con: McGoverne (6/8) 6', 11', 19', 23', 29', 73'	Report	Try: Wills 62' m Russell 80' m

Sandy Park
Referee: Craig Maxwell-Keys

Bye/s: Bristol Bears

=== Round 3 ===
19 October 2024
12:00

(1 BP) Bristol Bears	24–41	Saracens (1 BP)
Try: David (2) 35' c, 63' m Skeldon 53' m Reed 77' c Con: Reed (1/3) 36'; Bevan (1/1) 78'	Report	Try: Linkins 20' m Campbell (2) 30' c, 48' c Gregson (2) 39' m, 67' c Field 73' c Con: MacDougall (2/4) 32', 49'; Linkins (2/2) 68', 74'; Pen: Linkins (1/1) 79'

Ashton Gate
Referee: Holly Wood

19 October 2024
14:00

(1 BP) Loughborough Lightning	36–17	Sale Sharks
Try: Davey 4' c Westcombe-Evans (2) 10' m, 48' m Taufo'ou 16' m Green 32' c Clarke 44' c Con: Green (3/6) 5', 33', 45'	Report	Try: Hopkins 29' m Rigoni 67' m Antwis 76' c Con: Wilkins (1/3) 77'

Franklin's Gardens
Referee: Andy Wigley

19 October 2024
15:00

(1 BP) Gloucester–Hartpury	15–21	Exeter Chiefs
Try: Williams-Morris 2' m Dale 32' c Con: Sing (1/2) 33'; Pen: Sing (1/1) 40'	Report	Try: Nelson (2) 9' c, 56' c Nielson 15' c Con: McGoverne (3/3) 10', 16', 57'

Kingsholm
Referee: George Selwood

20 October 2024
17:45

Leicester Tigers	17–31	Harlequins (1 BP)
Try: Fray 57' m Omokhuale 72' c Childs 79' m Con: Feury (1/3) 73'	Report	Try: Leaney (2) 7' m, 68' m Neumann 23' c Shillaker 36' c Konkel-Roberts 53' c Con: Cromack (2/3) 24', 38'; Tuima (1/2) 54'

Welford Road
Referee: Nikki O'Donnell

Bye/s: Trailfinders

=== Round 4 ===
26 October 2024
15:00

(1 BP) Exeter Chiefs	36–25	Trailfinders
Try: Poulin 27' m Johnson 39' m Penalty try 46'; Nielson 50' m Rogers 54' c Cramer 80+2' c Con: McGoverne (1/4) 55'; Tessier (1/1) 80+3'	Report	Try: Blanco 4' c Dow 67' m Schell 74' c Con: Taylor (2/3) 5', 75'; Pen: Taylor (2/2) 31', 40+1'

Sandy Park
Referee: Charlie Gayther

26 October 2024
15:00

(1 BP) Harlequins	22–19	Loughborough Lightning (1 BP)
Try: C. Powell 25' m Neumann 28' m Phillips 64' m Kildunne 75' c Con: Tuima (1/4) 76'	Report	Try: Westcombe-Evans 12' c Keates 34' c Davey 53' m Con: Scarratt (2/3) 13', 35'

Twickenham Stoop
Referee: George Selwood

26 October 2024
19:00

Sale Sharks	10–57	Bristol Bears (1 BP)
Try: Swailes 24' m Fielding 56' m	Report	Try: Nigrelli 2' c Penalty try 9'; Keight 12' m Bern 34' c Ward 37' c J. Joyce-Butchers (2) 40+1' m, 58' c Webb 49' c Atkin-Davies 65' m Con: Reed (3/5) 3', 35', 38'; Bevan (2/3) 50', 59'

Heywood Road
Referee: Hamish Smales

27 October 2024
12:45

(1 BP) Saracens	49–38	Gloucester–Hartpury (1 BP)
Try: Field 21' c Senft (2) 24' c, 79' c M. Hunt 29' c Campbell (2) 53' c, 72' c Linkins 68' c Con: Harrison (7/7) 22', 25', 30', 40', 69', 73', 80'	Report	Try: Carson 3' c Sing 14' m Lund (2) 33' c, 64' m Aldcroft 36' c Metcalfe 39' c Con: Sing (4/6) 4', 34', 37', 40'

StoneX Stadium
Referee: Dan Jones

Bye/s: Leicester Tigers

=== Round 5 ===
1 November 2024
19:00

Bristol Bears	19–34	Harlequins (1 BP)
Try: David 4' c Bonner 27' c R. Marston-Mulhearn 38' m Con: Bevan (2/3) 5', 28'	Report	Try: C. Powell 12' c Torley 16' m Kildunne 19' m Lochner 62' c Callender 72' c Con: Tuima (3/5) 13', 63', 73'; Pen: Tuima (1/1) 33'

Shaftesbury Park
Referee: Dan Jones

2 November 2024
13:00

(1 BP) Exeter Chiefs	29–12	Saracens
Try: Doidge 8' c F. Robinson 39' c Sinclair 55' m Rogers 64' c Con: Tessier (3/4) 9', 40', 65'; Pen: Tessier (1/1) 40+2'	Report	Try: McKenna 12' c Gondwe 29' m Con: Harrison (1/2) 13'

Sandy Park
Referee: Charlie Gayther

3 November 2024
14:00

(1 BP) Gloucester–Hartpury	27–14	Sale Sharks
Try: Stafford 10' c Metcalfe 43' m N. Jones (2) 53' m, 60' m Woodman 73' m Con: Sing (1/4) 11'	Report	Try: Stefan 19' c Cowan 79' c Con: Wilkins (2/2) 20', 80'

Hartpury Stadium
Referee: Andy Wigley

3 November 2024
15:00

Leicester Tigers	17–36	Trailfinders (1 BP)
Try: McGhie (2) 25' m, 73' m Omokhuale 46' c Con: Gallagher (1/3) 47'	Report	Try: Rollie 3' m Inman 18' m Schell 58' c Mattinson 60' m Taylor (2) 65' c, 76' c Con: Taylor (3/6) 59', 66', 77'

Welford Road
Referee: Holly Wood

Bye/s: Loughborough Lightning

=== Round 6 ===
9 November 2024
12:00

Leicester Tigers	7–62	Bristol Bears (1 BP)
Try: McGhie 27' c Con: Feury (1/1) 28'	Report	Try: David (4) 8' m, 36' c, 40' c, 54' c Hesketh 9' m J. Joyce-Butchers 18' m A. Joyce-Butchers 34' c R. Marston-Mulhearn 52' c Skeldon 67' c Lovibond 80' m Con: Reed (6/10) 35', 37', 40+1', 53', 55', 68'

Welford Road
Referee: Jonathan Cook

9 November 2024
15:00

Trailfinders	19–32	Gloucester–Hartpury (1 BP)
Try: White 53' c Beukeboom 73' m Crake 77' c Con: Taylor (2/3) 54', 78'	Report	Try: Sing 11' m Rugman (2) 21' m, 36' m Matthews 47' c Stafford 57' c Con: Sing (2/5) 48', 58'; Pen: Sing (1/1) 80'

Trailfinders Sports Ground
Referee: Mike Hudson

10 November 2024
14:00

(1 BP) Harlequins	38–7	Sale Sharks
Try: C. Powell (2) 14' c, 45' c Turani 22' c Wythe (2) 37' m, 54' m Delgado 73' c Con: Tuima (4/6) 15', 23', 46', 74'	Report	Try: Stefan 77' c Con: Duffy (1/1) 78'

Twickenham Stoop
Referee: Harry Walbaum

10 November 2024
15:00

(1 BP) Exeter Chiefs	40–19	Loughborough Lightning
Try: Wall 3' m Poulin (2) 9' c, 49' c Tessier 30' c Rogers 38' c Jefferies 56' c Con: Tessier (5/6) 10', 31', 39', 50', 57'	Report	Try: Keates 15' c Scurfield 53' c Treder 66' m Con: Scarratt (2/3) 16', 54'

Sandy Park
Referee: Alex Thomas

Bye/s: Saracens

=== Round 7 ===
23 November 2024
14:00

(1 BP) Bristol Bears	26–7	Trailfinders
Try: Orr 7' c R. Marston-Mulhearn 40+3' m Bern 43' c Reed 56' c Con: Reed (3/4) 8', 44', 57'	Report	Try: Beukeboom 35' c Con: Taylor (1/1) 36'

Shaftesbury Park
Referee: Tom Foley

23 November 2024
14:00

(1 BP) Loughborough Lightning	36–24	Leicester Tigers
Try: Scurfield 14' m Waudby 21' c Scarratt 34' c Treder 40+2' c Kelter 56' c Con: Scarratt (4/5) 22', 35', 40+3', 57'; Pen: Rowland (1/1) 79'	Report	Try: M. Jones 19' c Brody 39' c Jacobs 77' c Con: Feury (2/2) 20', 40'; Gallagher (1/1) 78'; Pen: Gallagher (1/1) 8'

Franklin's Gardens
Referee: Jack Makepeace

24 November 2024
14:00

Sale Sharks	19–29	Exeter Chiefs (1 BP)
Try: Harper 8' c Duffy 30' c Thorpe 77' m Con: Duffy (2/2) 9', 31'	Report	Try: Nelson 11' m Jefferies 18' c Poulin 23' m Penalty try 40'; Buchanan 51' m Con: McGoverne (1/4) 19'

Heywood Road
Referee: Hamish Grant

24 November 2024
15:00

(1 BP) Saracens	14–15	Harlequins
Try: Campbell 65' c Harrison 71' c Con: Harrison (2/2) 66', 72'	Report	Try: Wilcock (2) 23' m, 63' m Hanlon 37' m

StoneX Stadium
Referee: Richard Gordon

Bye/s: Gloucester–Hartpury

=== Round 8 ===
30 November 2024
14:00

(1 BP) Gloucester–Hartpury	14–19	Bristol Bears
Try: Rugman 44' c Hyett 53' c Con: Sing (2/2) 45', 54'	Report	Try: Keight 6' m Aitchison 12' c Murray 60' c Con: Aitchison (1/2) 13'; Reed (1/1) 61'

Kingsholm
Referee: Christophe Ridley

30 November 2024
14:00

(1 BP) Saracens	32–21	Loughborough Lightning
Try: Harrison 14' c Corrigan 26' c M. Hunt 52' c Bermudez 75' m Con: Harrison (3/4) 15', 27', 53'; Pen: Harrison (2/2) 59', 80+3'	Report	Try: Scurfield 34' c Goldthorp 37' c Kelter 63' c Con: Scarratt (3/3) 35', 38', 64'

StoneX Stadium
Referee: Holly Wood

30 November 2024
15:00

(1 BP) Harlequins	47–26	Trailfinders (1 BP)
Try: K. Powell 4' c C. Powell 19' c Peña 26' m Hanlon 32' c Konkel-Roberts 40+1' c Latsha 67' c Parry 77' c Con: Tuima (6/7) 5', 20', 33', 40+2', 68', 78'	Report	Try: Thomson 8' c White 36' m Beukeboom 64' c Dow 70' c Con: Taylor (3/4) 9', 65', 71'

Twickenham Stoop
Referee: Hamish Grant

1 December 2024
15:00

Sale Sharks	17–34	Leicester Tigers (1 BP)
Try: Thorpe (2) 6' m, 78' c Benson 58' m Con: Duffy (1/3) 79'	Report	Try: Fray 1' c Bartlett 9' m M. Jones (2) 16' m, 61' m Omokhuale 24' m Cokayne 36' c Con: Feury (1/4) 2'; M. Jones (1/2) 37'

Salford Community Stadium
Referee: Jack Makepeace

Bye/s: Exeter Chiefs

=== Round 9 ===
7 December 2024
12:30

Leicester Tigers	5–38	Saracens (1 BP)
Try: Bartlett 58' m	Report	Try: Clifford 1' c Sharp 4' c Senft 14' m Gondwe 22' c Gregson (2) 46' c, 54' m Con: Harrison (4/6) 2', 5', 23', 47'

Welford Road
Referee: Alex Thomas

7 December 2024
15:00

(1 BP) Trailfinders	31–5	Sale Sharks
Try: Burton (3) 7' c, 32' c, 59' m Taylor 40+1' c Dow 44' m Con: Taylor (3/5) 8', 33', 40+2'	Report	Try: Wood 35' m

Trailfinders Sports Ground
Referee: Charlie Gayther

8 December 2024
15:00

Loughborough Lightning	7–31	Gloucester–Hartpury (1 BP)
Try: Green 77' c Con: Nelson (1/1) 78'	Report	Try: N. Jones 4' c Muir 18' m Metcalfe 49' m N. Hunt 56' c Tuipulotu 64' c Con: Sing (3/5) 5', 57', 65'

Franklin's Gardens
Referee: Nikki O'Donnell

8 February 2025
12:15

(1 BP) Bristol Bears	45–17	Exeter Chiefs
Try: Bevan 5' c Maher (2) 22' m, 47' c Atkin-Davies (3) 27' c, 40+1' c, 53' m Ward 63' c Con: Bevan (1/2) 6'; Reed (4/5) 28', 40+2', 48', 64'	Report	Try: Rogers 17' m F. Robinson 55' c Tasker 74' m Con: F. Robinson (1/3) 56'

Ashton Gate
Referee: Neil Chivers

Bye/s: Harlequins

=== Round 10 ===
14 December 2024
12:00

(1 BP) Trailfinders	22–41	Exeter Chiefs (1 BP)
Try: White 1' m K. Evans (2) 22' m, 42' m Meta 80+1' c Con: Schell (1/3) 80+2'	Report	Try: Rogers (4) 12' m, 26' m, 33' c, 48' c Poulin 35' m Moloney 56' m Buchanan 63' c Con: Tessier (1/4) 34'; McGoverne (2/3) 50', 64'

Trailfinders Sports Ground
Referee: Holly Wood

14 December 2024
14:00

(1 BP) Gloucester–Hartpury	47–31	Saracens (1 BP)
Try: K. Williams 10' m Metcalfe 15' c N. Hunt 32' c Sing 42' c Muir 54' c N. Jones 71' c Carson 74' c Con: Sing (6/7) 16', 33', 44', 55', 72', 75'	Report	Try: Campbell 24' c Harrison (2) 35' c, 51' c Clifford 59' c Con: Harrison (4/4) 25', 37', 52', 60'; Pen: Harrison (1/1) 30'

Kingsholm
Referee: Mike Hudson

14 December 2024
15:05

(1 BP) Loughborough Lightning	22–40	Harlequins (1 BP)
Try: Hibbert-Jones 8' m Kelter 18' m Kabeya 58' m Treder 69' c Con: Nelson (1/4) 70'	Report	Try: C. Powell 12' m Konkel-Roberts (2) 26' c, 73' c Turani 52' c Swords 63' c Lochner 80+2' c Con: Tuima (5/6) 27', 53', 64', 74', 80+4'

Franklin's Gardens
Referee: Charlie Gayther

15 December 2024
14:00

(1 BP) Bristol Bears	54–17	Sale Sharks
Try: Atkin-Davies (2) 8' m, 46' c Bern 28' c Lovibond 37' c Penalty try 39'; David 56' c Sprague 72' c Aitchison 77' c Con: Aitchison (6/7) 29', 38', 47', 57', 73', 78'	Report	Try: Philipps 25' m Rigoni 34' c Duffy 50' m Con: Wilkins (1/3) 35'

Shaftesbury Park
Referee: Ben Wood

Bye/s: Leicester Tigers

=== Round 11 ===
21 December 2024
14:00

(1 BP) Saracens	33–24	Bristol Bears (1 BP)
Try: Campbell (2) 14' c, 77' c M. Hunt 20' c Clifford 28' c Harrison 66' m Con: McKenna (1/1) 15'; Harrison (3/4) 21', 29', 78'	Report	Try: R. Marston-Mulhearn 5' c Ward 10' c Atkin-Davies 32' m J. Joyce-Butchers 63' m Con: Aitchison (2/4) 6', 11'

StoneX Stadium
Referee: Owen Taylor

21 December 2024
14:15

Sale Sharks	7–50	Loughborough Lightning (1 BP)
Try: Antwis 35' c Con: Duffy (1/1) 37'	Report	Try: Treder (2) 6' m, 58' m Scurfield (4) 19' c, 25' c, 63' c, 75' c Kelter 51' c Belisle 71' m Con: Scarratt (4/6) 20', 26', 52', 64'; Kelter (1/2) 76'

Heywood Road
Referee: Nikki O'Donnell

21 December 2024
15:00

Exeter Chiefs	12–41	Gloucester–Hartpury (1 BP)
Try: Feaunati 68' m Jacoby 76' c Con: Tessier (1/2) 77'	Report	Try: Venner (2) 16' c, 39' c Hendy (2) 22' m, 34' m Lewis 25' m N. Jones 43' m H. Jones 73' c Con: Sing (3/7) 17', 40', 74'

Sandy Park
Referee: Joe James

28 December 2024
15:00

(1 BP) Harlequins	42–17	Leicester Tigers
Try: Peña (2) 9' m, 39' m C. Powell 18' m K. Powell 28' c Neumann 32' m Phillips 60' m Kildunne (2) 65' m, 70' m Con: Tuima (1/6) 29'	Report	Try: M. Jones 6' c Henrich 56' m Sagapolu 74' m Con: M. Jones (1/3) 7'

Twickenham Stadium
Attendance: 18,055
Referee: Holly Wood

Bye/s: Trailfinders

=== Round 12 ===
4 January 2025
15:00

(2 BP) Trailfinders	39–46	Harlequins (1 BP)
Try: K. Evans 11' m Beukeboom 19' m Zackary (2) 39' c, 69' m Penalty try 46'; Crake 58' m Laflin 68' m Con: Schell (1/3) 40'	Report	Try: Turani 3' c Peña 8' c Konkel-Roberts 21' c Kildunne 24' m C. Powell 32' m K. Powell (2) 49' m, 76' m Phillips 72' m Con: Tuima (3/8) 4', 9', 22'

Trailfinders Sports Ground
Referee: Hamish Grant

4 January 2025
17:50

(1 BP) Leicester Tigers	38–17	Sale Sharks
Try: M. Jones (3) 4' c, 17' c, 21' m Henrich (2) 8' m, 57' c Fray 40+3' c Con: M. Jones (2/4) 5', 18'; Gallagher (1/1) 40+4'; Henrich (1/1) 58'	Report	Try: Hopkins (2) 48' m, 62' c Morrissey 79' m Con: Duffy (1/3) 63'

Welford Road
Referee: Alex Thomas

5 January 2025
12:45

Bristol Bears	17–40	Gloucester–Hartpury (1 BP)
Try: David 11' m A. Joyce-Butchers 37' m Bern 64' c Con: Aitchison (1/3) 65'	Report	Try: Sing 9' c N. Hunt 50' c Lund 55' c Muir 59' c Venner 70' m Brock 78' c Con: Sing (5/6) 10', 52', 56', 60', 80'

Ashton Gate
Attendance: 9,240
Referee: Joe James

5 January 2025
17:30

(1 BP) Loughborough Lightning	22–17	Saracens (1 BP)
Try: Scurfield (2) 5' m, 39' m Kabeya 19' c Scarratt 52' m Con: Scarratt (1/4) 20'	Report	Try: Harrison 14' m Gregson 23' m Montiel 78' c Con: MacDougall (1/1) 79'

Franklin's Gardens
Referee: Harry Walbaum

Bye/s: Exeter Chiefs

=== Round 13 ===
11 January 2025
14:00

(1 BP) Gloucester–Hartpury	36–19	Loughborough Lightning
Try: Tuipulotu 3' m Venner 20' c Simpson 33' c George (2) 43' m, 80' m Carson 67' c Con: Sing (3/6) 21', 34', 68'	Report	Try: Mataitoga (2) 6' m, 77' c Kelter 48' c Con: Nelson (1/2) 49'; Kelter (1/1) 78'

Kingsholm (Note: The match between Gloucester–Hartpury and Loughborough Lightning was due to be held at the Hartpury Stadium, but it was relocated to Kingsholm because of forecasted adverse weather.)
Referee: Harry Walbaum

11 January 2025
14:00

(1 BP) Saracens	100–0	Leicester Tigers
Try: Infante 3' m M. Packer (2) 6' c, 11' c Harrison (3) 13' c, 19' m, 37' m Hardy (2) 23' m, 59' c Bridger (3) 32' c, 48' c, 74' c Campbell 42' m Bermudez 45' c Galligan 51' c Alejandro (2) 67' c, 77' m Con: Harrison (4/8) 7', 12', 14', 33'; MacDougall (6/8) 46', 49', 52', 60', 68', 75'	Report

StoneX Stadium
Referee: Dan Jones

12 January 2025
15:00

(1 BP) Exeter Chiefs	31–41	Bristol Bears (1 BP)
Try: McGoverne 15' c T. Perry 36' c MacDonald (2) 40' m, 72' c Tessier 64' m Con: Tessier (3/5) 16', 38', 73'	Report	Try: Murray 3' m Penalty try (2) 29', 48'; Bonner 34' c Varley 43' c Maher 55' m Con: Bevan (2/4) 35', 44'; Pen: Bevan (1/1) 68'

Sandy Park
Referee: Craig Maxwell-Keys

8 February 2025
14:00

Sale Sharks	20–33	Trailfinders (1 BP)
Try: Ortiz 30' m Fielding 54' c Jarrell 77' m Con: Wilkins (1/3) 55'; Pen: V. A. Irwin (1/1) 6'	Report	Try: Schell (2) 18' c, 46' c Zackary 23' c White 35' m Burton 73' c Con: Schell (4/5) 19', 24', 47', 74'

Heywood Road
Referee: Andy Wigley

Bye/s: Harlequins

=== Round 14 ===
18 January 2025
13:00

(1 BP) Bristol Bears	43–29	Leicester Tigers (1 BP)
Try: Phillips (4) 7' c, 20' m, 50' c, 57' c Pam 9' c David 27' m Nigrelli 71' m Con: Bevan (4/6) 8', 10', 51', 58'	Report	Try: Henrich 36' c Brody (2) 47' c, 54' c M. Jones 62' m Fray 79'; Con: M. Jones (4/5) 37', 48', 55', 80'

Shaftesbury Park
Referee: Mike Hudson

18 January 2025
14:00

Sale Sharks	10–43	Harlequins (1 BP)
Try: Stefan 10' c Con: Duffy (1/1) 11'; Pen: Duffy (1/1) 36'	Report	Try: Kildunne (3) 5' m, 46' c, 70' m Parry 21' c Peña 50' c Phillips 66' m Mayhew 80+2' c Con: Tuima (3/4) 22', 47', 51'; Cromack (1/3) 80+3'

Heywood Road
Referee: Samuel Yates

18 January 2025
15:05

(1 BP) Gloucester–Hartpury	33–31	Trailfinders (2 BP)
Try: N. Hunt (2) 2' c, 39' c Carson 18' c N. Jones 60' m Metcalfe 64' c Con: George (4/5) 3', 19', 40', 65'	Report	Try: Wood (2) 31' c, 46' m Beukeboom 36' m Leatherman 53' c Musgrove 73' c Con: Schell (3/5) 32', 54', 74'

Kingsholm
Referee: Nikki O'Donnell

19 January 2025
15:00

(1 BP) Loughborough Lightning	15–19	Exeter Chiefs
Try: Kelter 21' c Scurfield 61' m Con: Rowland (1/2) 22'; Pen: Scarratt (1/1) 69'	Report	Try: Tessier 16' c Nelson 66' c Tuttosi 79' m Con: Tessier (2/3) 17', 67'

Franklin's Gardens
Referee: Charlie Gayther

Bye/s: Saracens

=== Round 15 ===
25 January 2025
12:00

(1 BP) Trailfinders	39–38	Bristol Bears (2 BP)
Try: Zackary 3' m Thomson (2) 7' m, 30' c Musgrove (2) 23' m, 40+4' m Beukeboom 52' m Moore 60' c Con: Thomson (2/7) 31', 61'	Report	Try: Atkin-Davies (2) 18' c, 72' m A. Joyce-Butchers 25' c David (2) 38' c, 67' c Bonner 49' m Con: Bevan (4/6) 19', 26', 39', 69'

Trailfinders Sports Ground
Referee: Charlie Gayther

25 January 2025
12:45

Leicester Tigers	12–61	Loughborough Lightning (1 BP)
Try: Fray 19' c Brody 38' m Con: Gallagher (1/2) 20'	Report	Try: Scurfield (2) 4' c, 45' c Malcolm 14' m Treder 23' c Rowland 28' c Belisle 55' c Brebner-Holden 67' c Morrall 73' c Hibbert-Jones 78' c Con: Rowland (8/9) 5', 24', 29', 46', 56', 68', 74', 79'

Welford Road
Referee: Holly Wood

25 January 2025
15:00

Harlequins	10–33	Saracens (1 BP)
Try: Kildunne 39' m Fleming 64' m	Report	Try: Sharp (2) 10' m, 43' c Field 14' c Bridger 58' c Gondwe 67' c Con: MacDougall (3/4) 15', 44', 60'; Blacklock (1/1) 69'

Twickenham Stoop
Referee: Mike Hudson

26 January 2025
12:00

(1 BP) Exeter Chiefs	7–12	Sale Sharks
Try: Johnson 66' c Con: Cantorna (1/1) 67'	Report	Try: Wright 32' m Rigoni 43' c Con: V. A. Irwin (1/1) 45'

Sandy Park
Referee: Dan Jones

Bye/s: Gloucester–Hartpury

=== Round 16 ===
1 February 2025
12:00

Leicester Tigers	7–38	Gloucester–Hartpury (1 BP)
Try: Gallagher 40' c Con: Gallagher (1/1) 40+1'	Report	Try: Davies 13' m Castellucci 17' c Penalty try 39'; H. Jones 50' m Buggy 61' c Boag 73' c Con: Sing (3/5) 18', 62', 74'

Welford Road
Referee: Ben Simpson

1 February 2025
14:00

(1 BP) Bristol Bears	22–31	Loughborough Lightning (1 BP)
Try: Bevan 33' c David 40' m Atkin-Davies 72' m Bonner 74' m Con: Bevan (1/4) 35'	Report	Try: Scurfield (2) 26' c, 41' c Treder 31' m Martin 65' m Kelter 67' c Con: Rowland (3/5) 27', 42', 68'

Shaftesbury Park
Referee: Mike Hudson

1 February 2025
15:00

Trailfinders	17–31	Saracens (1 BP)
Try: Wood 3' c Inman 22' m Cooksey 69' m Con: Inman (1/3) 4'	Report	Try: Campbell (3) 10' c, 76' c, 80+1' m P. Cleall 32' c G. Evans 49' m Con: MacDougall (2/2) 11', 33'; Blacklock (1/3) 78'

Trailfinders Sports Ground
Referee: Nikki O'Donnell

2 February 2025
12:45

(2 BP) Exeter Chiefs	30–31	Harlequins (1 BP)
Try: Rogers 1' m Doidge 21' c MacDonald (2) 40' c, 72' m Con: McGoverne (2/4) 22', 40+1'; Pen: McGoverne (2/2) 50', 63'	Report	Try: Grant 4' c Neumann 31' m Kildunne (2) 53' c, 74' c Peña 69' m Con: Cromack (3/5) 5', 54', 75'

Sandy Park
Referee: Alex Thomas

Bye/s: Sale Sharks

=== Round 17 ===
14 February 2025
19:30

Harlequins	10–19	Bristol Bears
Try: Kildunne (2) 30' m, 52' m	Report	Try: Murray 8' m A. Joyce-Butchers 35' c Bern 58' c Con: Aitchison (2/3) 36', 59'

Twickenham Stoop
Referee: Richard Gordon

15 February 2025
15:00

(2 BP) Trailfinders	43–45	Leicester Tigers (1 BP)
Try: Zackary 5' m Cooksey 24' c Musgrove (2) 30' m, 44' m Thomson 73' c Schell 75' c Inman 77' c Con: Schell (4/7) 25', 74', 76', 78'	Report	Try: Brody (2) 18' c, 41' c McGhie (3) 28' c, 49' m, 53' c M. Jones 34' m Penalty try 40+1'; Con: Gallagher (4/6) 19', 29', 42', 54'

Trailfinders Sports Ground
Referee: Craig Maxwell-Keys

15 February 2025
15:00

Saracens	21–12	Exeter Chiefs
Try: Bridger 12' c Campbell 29' c P. Cleall 37' c Con: Harrison (3/3) 13', 30', 38'	Report	Try: McGillivray 5' c MacDonald 61' m Con: McGoverne (1/2) 6'

StoneX Stadium
Referee: Anthony Woodthorpe

15 February 2025
19:00

Sale Sharks	24–41	Gloucester–Hartpury (1 BP)
Try: Stefan 53' c Talling 60' c Jarrell 80' c Con: Wilkins (3/3) 54', 61', 80+1'; Pen: Wilkins (1/1) 14'	Report	Try: Aldcroft 5' m Lund 16' m Venner (3) 39' m, 41' m, 56' c Boag 46' c Samuda 74' c Con: George (1/5) 47'; Green (2/2) 57', 75'

Heywood Road
Referee: Nikki O'Donnell

Bye/s: Loughborough Lightning

=== Round 18 ===
21 February 2025
19:45

(1 BP) Gloucester–Hartpury	52–12	Harlequins
Try: N. Hunt 19' c Aldcroft 23' c N. Jones (2) 38' c, 44' m Venner 52' m Beckett 60' c Hendy 65' c Else 78' c Con: Sing (6/8) 20', 24', 39', 61', 66', 79'	Report	Try: C. Powell 40+2' m Parry 54' c Con: Tuima (1/2) 55'

Kingsholm
Referee: Nikki O'Donnell

21 February 2025
19:45

(1 BP) Leicester Tigers	19–24	Exeter Chiefs (1 BP)
Try: McBrien 18' c Gallagher 30' c M. Jones 50' m Con: Gallagher (2/3) 19', 31'	Report	Try: Rogers 4' c Wall 13' c Tuttosi (2) 64' m, 80+2' m Con: McGoverne (2/4) 5', 14'

Welford Road
Referee: Alex Thomas

21 February 2025
19:45

(1 BP) Loughborough Lightning	36–34	Trailfinders (2 BP)
Try: Treder (2) 7' c, 33' c Scarratt 13' c Rowland 16' m Campion 56' c Con: Rowland (4/5) 8', 14', 34', 57'; Drop: Rowland (1/1) 78'	Report	Try: Beukeboom 3' m Inman 26' m Zackary 28' c Thomson 59' c Schell 65' c Con: Schell (3/5) 29', 60', 66'; Pen: Schell (1/1) 69'

Franklin's Gardens
Referee: Holly Wood

21 February 2025
19:45

(1 BP) Saracens	66–14	Sale Sharks
Try: Senft (2) 9' c, 24' c McMillan 18' c Gregson (2) 30' c, 80' m Campbell 35' c Gondwe 43' c M. Packer 52' m B. Cleall 62' c M. Hunt 73' c Con: Harrison (8/9) 10', 19', 26', 31', 36', 44', 63', 74'	Report	Try: Howard 32' c Stefan 48' c Con: Wilkins (2/2) 33', 49'

StoneX Stadium
Referee: Mike Hudson

Bye/s: Bristol Bears

== Play-offs ==
As in previous seasons, the top four teams in the league table, following the conclusion of the regular season, will contest the play-off semi-finals in a 1st vs 4th and 2nd vs 3rd format, with the higher ranking team having home advantage. The two winners of the semi-finals then meet in the final at StoneX Stadium on 16 March 2025.

On 4 February 2025, Gloucester–Hartpury and Harlequins were the first two teams to qualify for the play-offs, at the end of round 16 of the regular season. On 15 February 2025, Saracens and Bristol Bears secured the remaining two play-off places, following the conclusion of round 17. The final seedings were then confirmed after the last round of regular season fixtures on 21 February 2025.

Semi-finals
1 March 2025 – StoneX Stadium
Saracens	32
Harlequins	24
2 March 2025 – Kingsholm
Gloucester–Hartpury	36
Bristol Bears	20

Final
16 March 2025 – StoneX Stadium
Gloucester–Hartpury	34
Saracens	19

=== Semi-finals ===
1 March 2025
15:00

Saracens (2)	32–24	(3) Harlequins
Try: Corrigan (2) 7' m, 63' m Breach 19' m M. Packer 24' c Campbell 65' c Con: Harrison (2/5) 25', 66'; Pen: Harrison (1/1) 5'	Report	Try: Peña 1' m Kildunne 14' c Torley 58' m Latsha 70' c Con: Tuima (2/4) 15', 71'

StoneX Stadium
Referee: Holly Wood

Team details

FB	15	(England) Jess Breach
RW	14	(Canada) Alysha Corrigan
OC	13	(England) Emma Hardy		(substituted off) 59'
IC	12	(England) Sophie Bridger
LW	11	(United States) Lotte Sharp (cc)		(substituted off) 68'
FH	10	(England) Zoe Harrison
SH	9	(England) Ella Wyrwas
N8	8	(England) Poppy Cleall
OF	7	(England) Marlie Packer (cc)
BF	6	(Wales) Georgia Evans		(substituted off) 66'
RL	5	(Scotland) Louise McMillan		(substituted off) 52'
LL	4	(England) Rosie Galligan
TP	3	(England) Kelsey Clifford
HK	2	(England) May Campbell
LP	1	(England) Akina Gondwe		(substituted off) 59'
Substitutions:
HK	16	(England) Bryony Field		(substituted on) 66'
PR	17	(Canada) McKinley Hunt
PR	18	(England) Carmen Tremelling		(substituted on) 59'
LK	19	(England) Bryony Cleall
FL	20	(Canada) Gabby Senft	(yellow card) 73'	(substituted on) 52'
SH	21	(England) Tori Sellors
FB	22	(England) Sarah McKenna		(substituted on) 68'
CE	23	(England) Sydney Gregson		(substituted on) 59'
Coach:
(England) Alex Austerberry

FB	15	(England) Ellie Kildunne
RW	14	(England) Beth Wilcock	(substituted off) 49'
OC	13	(England) Sarah Parry	(substituted off) 53'
IC	12	(England) Lagi Tuima
LW	11	(Spain) Clàudia Peña
FH	10	(Wales) Kayleigh Powell
SH	9	(Ireland) Emma Swords	(substituted off) 66'
N8	8	(Scotland) Jade Konkel-Roberts (c)
OF	7	(Wales) Abbie Fleming
BF	6	(Scotland) Sarah Bonar
RL	5	(South Africa) Danelle Lochner	(substituted off) 59'
LL	4	(England) Tyla Shirley	(substituted off) 49'
TP	3	(England) Lizzie Hanlon	(substituted off) 64'
HK	2	(England) Connie Powell	(substituted off) 64'
LP	1	(Italy) Silvia Turani	(substituted off) 64'
Substitutions:
HK	16	(Wales) Carys Phillips	(substituted on) 64'
PR	17	(England) Jessie Spurrier	(substituted on) 64'
PR	18	(Spain) Laura Delgado	(substituted on) 64'
LK	19	(England) Harriet Millar-Mills	(substituted on) 59'
FL	20	(South Africa) Babalwa Latsha	(substituted on) 49'
SH	21	(England) Freya Aucken	(substituted on) 66'
FB	22	(England) Lauren Torley	(substituted on) 49'
WG	23	(Wales) Lisa Neumann	(substituted on) 53'
Coach:
(England) Ross Chisholm

Player of the Match:
(England) Poppy Cleall (Saracens)

Assistant referees:
Mike Hudson
James Cornell
Television match official:
Craig Maxwell-Keys

2 March 2025
15:00

Gloucester–Hartpury (1)	36–20	(4) Bristol Bears
Try: Perry 27' m Beckett 33' c Sing 40' c Aldcroft 58' c H. Jones 65' c Con: Sing (4/5) 34', 40+1', 59', 66'; Pen: Sing (1/1) 73'	Report	Try: Atkin-Davies (2) 14' m, 24' m Maher 45' m David 61' m

Kingsholm
Referee: Alex Thomas

Team details

FB	15	(England) Emma Sing
RW	14	(England) Mia Venner
OC	13	(Wales) Hannah Jones
IC	12	(England) Tatyana Heard	(substituted off) 73'
LW	11	(England) Pip Hendy
FH	10	(Wales) Lleucu George	(substituted off) 73'
SH	9	(England) Natasha Hunt (cc)	(substituted off) 75'
N8	8	(England) Alex Matthews
OF	7	(Wales) Beth Lewis	(substituted off) 49'
BF	6	(Wales) Kate Williams	(substituted off) 75'
RL	5	(England) Zoe Aldcroft (cc)
LL	4	(England) Sarah Beckett
TP	3	(England) Maud Muir	(substituted off) 41'
HK	2	(Ireland) Neve Jones	(substituted off) 75'
LP	1	(England) El Perry	(substituted off) 49'
Substitutions:
HK	16	(Canada) Gillian Boag	(substituted on) 75'
PR	17	(England) Mackenzie Carson	(substituted on) 49'
PR	18	(Ireland) Kathryn Buggy	(substituted on) 41'
N8	19	(England) Steph Else	(substituted on) 75'
FL	20	(England) Georgia Brock	(substituted on) 49'
SH	21	(Wales) Megan Davies	(substituted on) 75'
FH	22	(England) Millie Hyett	(substituted on) 73'
CE	23	(England) Rachel Lund	(substituted on) 73'
Coach:
(Wales) Sean Lynn

FB	15	(Wales) Courtney Keight
RW	14	(Wales) Jasmine Joyce-Butchers
OC	13	(England) Phoebe Murray
IC	12	(England) Amber Reed (cc)		(substituted off) 57'		(substituted on) 67'
LW	11	(United States) Ilona Maher		(substituted off) 49'
FH	10	(England) Holly Aitchison
SH	9	(Wales) Keira Bevan
N8	8	(Scotland) Evie Gallagher	(yellow card) 38'
OF	7	(England) Christiana Balogun		(substituted off) 41'
BF	6	(Wales) Alisha Joyce-Butchers
RL	5	(England) Abbie Ward (cc)
LL	4	(England) Hollie Cunningham		(substituted off) 57'
TP	3	(England) Sarah Bern					(substituted off) 76'
HK	2	(England) Lark Atkin-Davies		(substituted off) 76'
LP	1	(England) Hannah Botterman		(substituted off) 49'
Substitutions:
HK	16	(England) Holly Phillips		(substituted on) 76'
PR	17	(England) Simi Pam		(substituted on) 41'
PR	18	(Scotland) Elliann Clarke			(substituted on) 59'	(substituted off) 67'	(substituted on) 76'
LK	19	(England) Delaney Burns		(substituted on) 57'
FL	20	(England) Rownita Marston-Mulhearn		(substituted on) 49'
SH	21	(Wales) Ffion Lewis		(substituted on) 76'
CE	22	(Scotland) Megan Varley		(substituted on) 57'	(substituted off) 59'
WG	23	(England) Millie David		(substituted on) 49'
Coach:
(England) Dave Ward

Player of the Match:
Zoe Aldcroft (Gloucester–Hartpury)

Assistant referees:
Nikki O'Donnell
Calum Howard
Television match official:
David Rose

=== Final ===
16 March 2025
15:00

Gloucester–Hartpury (1)	34–19	(2) Saracens
Try: Williams 5' m Sing 23' m Venner 32' m Muir 43' c N. Jones 48' m N. Hunt 68' c Con: Sing (2/6) 44', 69'	Report	Try: Breach 6' c Penalty try 14'; Sharp 17' m Con: Harrison (1/2) 7'

StoneX Stadium
Attendance: 7,448
Referee: Joe James

Team details

FB	15	(England) Emma Sing
RW	14	(England) Mia Venner		(substituted off) 69'
OC	13	(Wales) Hannah Jones
IC	12	(England) Tatyana Heard		(substituted off) 78'
LW	11	(England) Pip Hendy
FH	10	(Wales) Lleucu George
SH	9	(England) Natasha Hunt (cc)	(yellow card) 14'	(substituted off) 78'
N8	8	(England) Alex Matthews	(yellow card) 51'
OF	7	(Wales) Beth Lewis		(substituted off) 62'
BF	6	(Wales) Kate Williams
RL	5	(England) Zoe Aldcroft (cc)
LL	4	(England) Sarah Beckett		(substituted off) 75'
TP	3	(England) Maud Muir		(substituted off) 73'
HK	2	(Ireland) Neve Jones		(substituted off) 75'
LP	1	(England) El Perry		(substituted off) 45'
Substitutions:
HK	16	(Canada) Gillian Boag		(substituted on) 75'
PR	17	(England) Mackenzie Carson		(substituted on) 45'
PR	18	(Ireland) Kathryn Buggy		(substituted on) 73'
N8	19	(England) Steph Else		(substituted on) 75'
FL	20	(England) Georgia Brock		(substituted on) 62'
SH	21	(Wales) Megan Davies		(substituted on) 78'
FH	22	(England) Ellie Green		(substituted on) 78'
CE	23	(England) Rachel Lund		(substituted on) 69'
Coach:
(Wales) Sean Lynn

FB	15	(England) Jess Breach
RW	14	(Canada) Alysha Corrigan
OC	13	(England) Emma Hardy	(substituted off) 51'
IC	12	(England) Sophie Bridger
LW	11	(United States) Lotte Sharp (cc)	(substituted off) 73'
FH	10	(England) Zoe Harrison
SH	9	(England) Ella Wyrwas
N8	8	(England) Poppy Cleall
OF	7	(England) Marlie Packer (cc)
BF	6	(Canada) Gabby Senft
RL	5	(Wales) Georgia Evans	(substituted off) 75'
LL	4	(England) Rosie Galligan	(substituted off) 69'
TP	3	(England) Kelsey Clifford
HK	2	(England) May Campbell	(substituted off) 69'
LP	1	(England) Akina Gondwe	(substituted off) 51'
Substitutions:
HK	16	(England) Bryony Field	(substituted on) 69'
PR	17	(Canada) McKinley Hunt	(substituted on) 51'
PR	18	(England) Carmen Tremelling
LK	19	(England) Bryony Cleall	(substituted on) 69'
LK	20	(Scotland) Louise McMillan	(substituted on) 75'
SH	21	(England) Tori Sellors
FB	22	(England) Sarah McKenna	(substituted on) 73'
CE	23	(England) Sydney Gregson	(substituted on) 51'
Coach:
(England) Alex Austerberry

Player of the Match:
(England) Maud Muir (Gloucester–Hartpury)

Assistant referees:
Alex Thomas
Calum Howard
Television match official:
Dan Jones

== Leading scorers ==
Note: Flags to the left of player names indicate national team as has been defined under World Rugby eligibility rules, or primary nationality for players who have not yet earned international senior caps. Players may hold one or more non-WR nationalities.

=== Most points ===
As of 16 March 2025

Rank	Player	Club	Points
1	(England) Emma Sing	Gloucester–Hartpury	163
2	(England) Zoe Harrison	Saracens	141
3	(England) May Campbell	Saracens	85
3	(England) Millie David	Bristol	85
5	(Canada) Emma Taylor	Trailfinders	72
6	(England) Ellie Kildunne	Harlequins	70
6	(Canada) Krissy Scurfield	Loughborough	70
8	(Canada) Julia Schell	Trailfinders	65
9	(England) Lagi Tuima	Harlequins	63
10	(England) Megan Jones	Leicester	62

=== Most tries ===
As of 16 March 2025

Rank	Player	Club	Tries
1	(England) May Campbell	Saracens	17
1	(England) Millie David	Bristol	17
3	(England) Ellie Kildunne	Harlequins	14
3	(Canada) Krissy Scurfield	Loughborough	14
5	(England) Lark Atkin-Davies	Bristol	12
6	(England) Megan Jones	Leicester	10
6	(United States) Hope Rogers	Exeter	10
8	(England) Zoe Harrison	Saracens	9
8	(Ireland) Neve Jones	Gloucester–Hartpury	9
8	(England) Connie Powell	Harlequins	9
8	(England) Emma Sing	Gloucester–Hartpury	9
8	(United States) Kathryn Treder	Loughborough	9

== Discipline ==
=== Citings/bans ===
Player	Match (Note: The cited player's club is listed in bold italics.)	Citing date	Law breached	Result	Ref
(Canada) Abby Duguid	Trailfinders vs. **Loughborough**	13 October 2024	9.13 – Dangerous Tackling (Red card)	3-match ban (Note: The ban is reduced by one match, subject to the player's completion of the World Rugby Coaching Intervention Programme.)	
(England) Abi Burton	**Trailfinders** vs. Loughborough	23 October 2024	9.20(d) – Dangerous Play in a Ruck (Red card)	5-match ban	
(England) Sarah Bern	Sale vs. **Bristol**	30 October 2024	9.20(d) – Dangerous Play in a Ruck (Citing)	1-match ban	
(Netherlands) Linde van der Velden	**Exeter** vs. Saracens	5 November 2024	9.13 – Dangerous Tackling (Citing)	4-match ban	
(Scotland) Lisa Cockburn	Trailfinders vs. **Gloucester–Hartpury**	13 November 2024	9.13 – Dangerous Tackling (Citing)	3-match ban	
(England) Lilli Ives Campion	Saracens vs. **Loughborough**	4 December 2024	9.13 – Dangerous Tackling (Citing)	Citing dismissed	
(Canada) Tyson Beukeboom	Harlequins vs. **Trailfinders**	5 December 2024	9.27 – 2 Yellow Cards (Red card)	Sending off sufficient	
(United States) Tahlia Brody	**Leicester** vs. Saracens	10 December 2024	9.13 – Dangerous Tackling (Red card)	3-match ban	
(United States) Rachel Johnson	Trailfinders vs. **Exeter**	17 December 2024	9.13 – Dangerous Tackling (Citing)	Citing dismissed	
(Italy) Beatrice Rigoni	**Sale** vs. Loughborough	30 December 2024	9.20(d) – Dangerous Play in a Ruck (Citing)	Citing dismissed	
(Canada) Taylor Perry	Loughborough vs. **Exeter**	21 January 2025	9.11 – Reckless or Dangerous Play (Red card)	Red card rescinded	
(England) Alex Matthews	**Gloucester–Hartpury** vs. Saracens	19 March 2025	9.13 – Dangerous Tackling (Citing)	3-match ban	
