= 2026–27 Premiership Women's Rugby =

Season in English women's rugby union

- Countries: England
- Number of teams: 9
- Date: November 2026 – June 2027
- Matches played: 4
- Tries scored: 44 (average 11 per match)

Official website
- www.thepwr.com

The 2026–27 Premiership Women's Rugby season, known as the 2026–27 JAECOO PWR for sponsorship reasons will be the tenth season of England's top-flight domestic women's rugby union club competition. It will be the fourth season to be branded as Premiership Women's Rugby.

The reigning champions entering the season are Saracens, who claimed their fourth league title having won the 2026 final against Trailfinders.

== Teams and locations ==
| Club | Director of Rugby/ Head Coach | Captain(s) | Stadium(s) | Capacity | Location |
|---|---|---|---|---|---|
| Bristol Bears | Scott Lawson | Lark Atkin-Davies | Ashton Gate | 27,000 | Bristol |
| Bristol Bears | Scott Lawson | Sarah Bern | Shaftesbury Park | — | Bristol |
| Exeter Chiefs | Oli Bishop | Emily Robinson | Sandy Park | 13,593 | Exeter, Devon |
| Gloucester–Hartpury | Dan Murphy (Note: For the Cup only, Dan Murphy departed the club on 19 November 2026.) | Alex Matthews | Kingsholm | 16,115 | Gloucester, Gloucestershire |
| Gloucester–Hartpury | Vacant (Note: From Round 1, no replacement head coach was named after Murphy's departure, instead the existing coaching team ran the senior programme. Luke Narraway joined as a consultant coach in the meantime.) | Alex Matthews | Kingsholm | 16,115 | Gloucester, Gloucestershire |
| Harlequins | Ross Chisholm | Aoife Wafer | Twickenham Stoop | 14,800 | Twickenham, Greater London |
| Leicester Tigers | Fraser Goatcher | Tess Feury | Welford Road | 25,849 | Leicester, Leicestershire |
| Loughborough Lightning | Nathan Smith | Daisy Hibbert-Jones | Franklin's Gardens | 14,249 | Northampton, Northamptonshire |
| Sale Sharks | Tom Hudson | | Heywood Road | 3,387 | Sale, Greater Manchester |
| Saracens | Alex Austerberry | May Campbell | StoneX Stadium | 10,500 | Hendon, Greater London |
| Saracens | Alex Austerberry | Zoe Harrison | StoneX Stadium | 10,500 | Hendon, Greater London |
| Trailfinders | Barney Maddison | | Trailfinders Sports Ground | 4,000 | West Ealing, Greater London |

=== Head coach changes ===
Ahead of the 2026–27 season, the following clubs announced changes to their head coach positions:

- Steve Salvin departed Exeter Chiefs at the end of the 2025–26 season, to become full-time forwards coach with Wales Women. Oli Bishop, who was Salvin's assistant, was named as his replacement in August 2026.
- Ross Bundy departed Leicester Tigers at the end of the 2025–26 season. He was later appointed as assistant coach at Exeter Chiefs.
- On 19 November 2026, 2 days before the first game of the season, Gloucester–Hartpury head coach Dan Murphy departed his role. No replacement was named in the announcement but the club stated that "The existing coaching team will continue to run the senior programme".

== PWR ==
2026–27 Premiership Women's Rugby table
| Pos | Team | Pld | W | D | L | PF | PA | PD | TF | TA | TB | LB | Pts | Qualification |
|---|---|---|---|---|---|---|---|---|---|---|---|---|---|---|
| 1 | Saracens | 1 | 1 | 0 | 0 | 100 | 14 | +86 | 16 | 2 | 1 | 0 | 5 | Qualifies for play-offs |
| 2 | Bristol Bears | 1 | 1 | 0 | 0 | 48 | 21 | +27 | 8 | 3 | 1 | 0 | 5 | Qualifies for play-offs |
| 3 | Trailfinders | 1 | 1 | 0 | 0 | 29 | 14 | +15 | 5 | 2 | 1 | 0 | 5 | Qualifies for play-offs |
| 4 | Sale Sharks | 1 | 1 | 0 | 0 | 31 | 17 | +14 | 5 | 3 | 1 | 0 | 5 | Qualifies for play-offs |
| 5 | Exeter Chiefs | 0 | 0 | 0 | 0 | 0 | 0 | 0 | 0 | 0 | 0 | 0 | 0 | |
| 6 | Gloucester–Hartpury | 1 | 0 | 0 | 1 | 17 | 31 | −14 | 3 | 5 | 0 | 0 | 0 | |
| 7 | Loughborough Lightning | 1 | 0 | 0 | 1 | 14 | 29 | −15 | 2 | 5 | 0 | 0 | 0 | |
| 8 | Harlequins | 1 | 0 | 0 | 1 | 21 | 48 | −27 | 3 | 8 | 0 | 0 | 0 | |
| 9 | Leicester Tigers | 1 | 0 | 0 | 1 | 14 | 100 | −86 | 2 | 16 | 0 | 0 | 0 | |

Updated to match(es) played on 22 November 2026. Source: Premiership Women's Rugby
Rules for classification: Tiebreakers for teams tied on points: 1) Number of matches won; 2) Difference between points for and against; 3) Total number of points for; 4) Aggregate number of points scored in matches between tied teams; 5) Number of matches won excluding the first match, then the second and so on until the tie is settled.

=== Round-by-round progression ===
The grid below shows each team's progression throughout the season, indicating their points total (and league table position) at the end of every round:

Team Progression
| Team | R1 | R2 | R3 | R4 | R5 | R6 | R7 | R8 | R9 | R10 | R11 | R12 | R13 | R14 | R15 | R16 | R17 | R18 |
|---|---|---|---|---|---|---|---|---|---|---|---|---|---|---|---|---|---|---|
| Saracens | 5 (1st) | | | | | | | | | | | | | | | | | |
| Bristol Bears | 5 (2nd) | | | | | | | | | | | | | | | | | |
| Trailfinders | 5 (3rd) | | | | | | | | | | | | | | | | | |
| Sale Sharks | 5 (4th) | | | | | | | | | | | | | | | | | |
| Exeter Chiefs | 0 (5th) | | | | | | | | | | | | | | | | | |
| Gloucester–Hartpury | 0 (6th) | | | | | | | | | | | | | | | | | |
| Loughborough Lightning | 0 (7th) | | | | | | | | | | | | | | | | | |
| Harlequins | 0 (8th) | | | | | | | | | | | | | | | | | |
| Leicester Tigers | 0 (9th) | | | | | | | | | | | | | | | | | |
Updated: 22 November 2026

Key
| Win | Draw | Loss | Bye |

== Regular season ==
The season was announced on 10 March 2026. Like the previous season, the league will take a break during the 2027 Women's Six Nations Championship. The regular season fixtures were announced on 5 August 2026.

Notes:

- All fixtures are subject to change.
- Referees appointed to officiate are employed by the RFU, unless indicated otherwise.

=== Results ===
| Home \ Away | BRI | EXE | GLO | HAR | LEI | LOU | SAL | SAR | TRA |
|---|---|---|---|---|---|---|---|---|---|
| Bristol Bears | — | 28 Nov | 11 Dec | 5/6/7; Feb | 4/5/6; Jun | 15 Jan | 19/20/21; Mar | 19/20/21; Feb | 26/27/28; Feb |
| Exeter Chiefs | 22/23/24; Jan | — | 28/29/30; May | 12 Dec | 12/13/14; Feb | 26/27/28; Feb | 19 Dec | 26/27/28; Mar | 10 Jan |
| Gloucester–Hartpury | 12/13/14; Mar | 3 Jan | — | 19/20/21; Feb | 26/27/28; Mar | 28 Nov | 5/6/7; Feb | 4/5/6; Jun | 22/23/24; Jan |
| Harlequins | 21–48 | 12/13/14; Mar | 10 Jan | — | 6 Dec | 28 Dec | 28/29/30; May | 22/23/24; Jan | 12/13/14; Feb |
| Leicester Tigers | 20 Dec | 19/20/21; Mar | 17 Jan | 26/27/28; Feb | — | 28/29/30; May | 29 Nov | 5/6/7; Feb | 13 Dec |
| Loughborough Lightning | 26/27/28; Mar | 6 Dec | 12/13/14; Feb | 4/5/6; Jun | 3 Jan | — | 9 Jan | 12/13/14; Mar | 14–29 |
| Sale Sharks | 12/13/14; Feb | 4/5/6; Jun | 31–17 | 2 Jan | 22/23/24; Jan | 19/20/21; Feb | — | 5 Dec | 26/27/28; Mar |
| Saracens | 9 Jan | 16 Jan | 20 Dec | 19/20/21; Mar | 100–14 | 13 Dec | 26/27/28; Feb | — | 28/29/30; May |
| Trailfinders | 4 Dec | 19/20/21; Feb | 19/20/21; Mar | 28 Nov | 12/13/14; Mar | 5/6/7; Feb | 16 Jan | 2 Jan | — |

Updated to match(es) played on 22 November 2026. Source: Premiership Women's Rugby
Legend: Blue = home team win; Yellow = draw; Red = away team win.

=== Round 1 ===
20 November 2026
19:30 GMT

| Loughborough Lightning | 14–29 | Trailfinders (1 BP) |
| Try: Lutui 4' c Symonds 19' c Con: Rowland (2/2) 5', 20' | Report | Try: M. Jones 11' m Montiel 23' c H. Jones 43' c Kalounivale 55' m Long 71' m Con: Nelson (2/5) 24', 44' |

Franklin's Gardens
Referee: Nicola O'Donnell

21 November 2026
14:00 GMT

| (1 BP) Sale Sharks | 31–17 | Gloucester–Hartpury |
| Try: Lloyd 4' m Cokayne (2) 27' c, 36' c Hogan 47' c Jarrell-Searcy 77' m Con: Aitchison (3/5) 28', 37', 48' | Report | Try: Muir 8' m Metcalfe (2) 13' c, 30' m Con: Sing (1/3) 14' |

Heywood Road
Referee: Ben Simpson

22 November 2026
13:00 GMT

| (1 BP) Saracens | 100–14 | Leicester Tigers |
| Try: Gregson (3) 1' c, 56' c, 76' c Crake (2) 7' m, 52' c Apps (3) 12' m, 44' c, 59' m McMillan 22' c Sharp 25' m Omokhuale 30' c de Goede 34' c Hardy 41' c Corrigan (3) 48' m, 64' c, 78' m Con: MacDougall (6/10) 2', 23', 31', 35', 42', 45'; Harrison (4/6) 53', 57', 65', 77' | Report | Try: Derera 18' c Günter 28' c Con: Freeman (2/2) 19', 29' |

StoneX Stadium
Referee: Rebecca Piddlesden

22 November 2026
15:00 GMT

| Harlequins | 21–48 | Bristol Bears (1 BP) |
| Try: Meuller (2) 8' c, 35' c M. Packer 55' c Con: Cromack (3/3) 9', 36', 57' | Report | Try: Bonner (2) 13' m, 27' m Kildunne (2) 21' c, 30' m Hyett 45' c David (2) 52' c, 65' m Gallagher 68' c Con: Smith (3/7) 22', 46', 53'; Bevan (1/1) 69' |

Twickenham Stoop
Referee: Holly Wood

Bye/s: Exeter Chiefs

=== Round 2 ===
28 November 2026
14:00 GMT

| Gloucester–Hartpury | – | Loughborough Lightning |

Kingsholm

28 November 2026
15:00 GMT

| Bristol Bears | – | Exeter Chiefs |

Shaftesbury Park

28 November 2026
19:00 GMT

| Trailfinders | – | Harlequins |

Trailfinders Sports Ground

29 November 2026
13:00 GMT

| Leicester Tigers | – | Sale Sharks |

Welford Road

Bye/s: Saracens

=== Round 3 ===
4 December 2026
19:30 GMT

| Trailfinders | – | Bristol Bears |

Trailfinders Sports Ground

5 December 2026
14:00 GMT

| Sale Sharks | – | Saracens |

Heywood Road

6 December 2026
12:15 GMT

| Loughborough Lightning | – | Exeter Chiefs |

Franklin's Gardens

6 December 2026
14:30 GMT

| Harlequins | – | Leicester Tigers |

Twickenham Stoop

Bye/s: Gloucester–Hartpury

=== Round 4 ===
11 December 2026
19:45 GMT

| Bristol Bears | – | Gloucester–Hartpury |

Shaftesbury Park

12 December 2026
15:05 GMT

| Exeter Chiefs | – | Harlequins |

Sandy Park

13 December 2026
13:00 GMT

| Leicester Tigers | – | Trailfinders |

Welford Road

13 December 2026
15:00 GMT

| Saracens | – | Loughborough Lightning |

StoneX Stadium

Bye/s: Sale Sharks

=== Round 5 ===
19 December 2026
12:00 GMT

| Exeter Chiefs | – | Sale Sharks |

Sandy Park

20 December 2026
14:00 GMT

| Leicester Tigers | – | Bristol Bears |

Welford Road

20 December 2026
15:00 GMT

| Saracens | – | Gloucester–Hartpury |

StoneX Stadium

28 December 2026
14:00 GMT

| Harlequins | – | Loughborough Lightning |

Twickenham

Bye/s: Trailfinders

=== Round 6 ===
2 January 2027
15:00 GMT

| Trailfinders | – | Saracens |

Trailfinders Sports Ground

2 January 2027
TBC

| Sale Sharks | – | Harlequins |

3 January 2027
12:15 GMT

| Gloucester–Hartpury | – | Exeter Chiefs |

Kingsholm

3 January 2027
18:00 GMT

| Loughborough Lightning | – | Leicester Tigers |

Franklin's Gardens

Bye/s: Bristol Bears

=== Round 7 ===
9 January 2027
13:00 GMT

| Loughborough Lightning | – | Sale Sharks |

Franklin's Gardens

9 January 2027
15:00 GMT

| Saracens | – | Bristol Bears |

StoneX Stadium

10 January 2027
13:00 GMT

| Exeter Chiefs | – | Trailfinders |

Sandy Park

10 January 2027
15:00 GMT

| Harlequins | – | Gloucester–Hartpury |

Twickenham Stoop

Bye/s: Leicester Tigers

=== Round 8 ===
15 January 2027
19:45 GMT

| Bristol Bears | – | Loughborough Lightning |

Shaftesbury Park

16 January 2027
15:00 GMT

| Saracens | – | Exeter Chiefs |

StoneX Stadium

16 January 2027
17:00 GMT

| Trailfinders | – | Sale Sharks |

Trailfinders Sports Ground

17 January 2027
13:00 GMT

| Leicester Tigers | – | Gloucester–Hartpury |

Welford Road

Bye/s: Harlequins

=== Round 9 ===
22/23/24 January 2027
TBC

| Sale Sharks | – | Leicester Tigers |

Heywood Road

22/23/24 January 2027
TBC

| Exeter Chiefs | – | Bristol Bears |

Sandy Park

22/23/24 January 2027
TBC

| Harlequins | – | Saracens |

Twickenham Stoop

22/23/24 January 2027
TBC

| Gloucester–Hartpury | – | Trailfinders |

Kingsholm

Bye/s: Loughborough Lightning

=== Round 10 ===
5/6/7 February 2027
TBC

| Bristol Bears | – | Harlequins |

Shaftesbury Park

5/6/7 February 2027
TBC

| Trailfinders | – | Loughborough Lightning |

Trailfinders Sports Ground

5/6/7 February 2027
TBC

| Gloucester–Hartpury | – | Sale Sharks |

Kingsholm

5/6/7 February 2027
TBC

| Leicester Tigers | – | Saracens |

Welford Road

Bye/s: Exeter Chiefs

=== Round 11 ===
12/13/14 February 2027
TBC

| Sale Sharks | – | Bristol Bears |

Heywood Road

12/13/14 February 2027
TBC

| Loughborough Lightning | – | Gloucester–Hartpury |

Franklin's Gardens

12/13/14 February 2027
TBC

| Harlequins | – | Trailfinders |

Twickenham Stoop

12/13/14 February 2027
TBC

| Exeter Chiefs | – | Leicester Tigers |

Sandy Park

Bye/s: Saracens

=== Round 12 ===
19/20/21 February 2027
TBC

| Bristol Bears | – | Saracens |

Shaftesbury Park

19/20/21 February 2027
TBC

| Trailfinders | – | Exeter Chiefs |

Trailfinders Sports Ground

19/20/21 February 2027
TBC

| Gloucester–Hartpury | – | Harlequins |

Kingsholm

19/20/21 February 2027
TBC

| Sale Sharks | – | Loughborough Lightning |

Heywood Road

Bye/s: Leicester Tigers

=== Round 13 ===
26/27/28 February 2027
TBC

| Bristol Bears | – | Trailfinders |

Shaftesbury Park

26/27/28 February 2027
TBC

| Exeter Chiefs | – | Loughborough Lightning |

Sandy Park

26/27/28 February 2027
TBC

| Saracens | – | Sale Sharks |

StoneX Stadium

26/27/28 February 2027
TBC

| Leicester Tigers | – | Harlequins |

Welford Road

Bye/s: Gloucester–Hartpury

=== Round 14 ===
12/13/14 March 2027
TBC

| Trailfinders | – | Leicester Tigers |

Trailfinders Sports Ground

12/13/14 March 2027
TBC

| Gloucester–Hartpury | – | Bristol Bears |

Kingsholm

12/13/14 March 2027
TBC

| Loughborough Lightning | – | Saracens |

Franklin's Gardens

12/13/14 March 2027
TBC

| Harlequins | – | Exeter Chiefs |

Twickenham Stoop

Bye/s: Sale Sharks

=== Round 15 ===
19/20/21 March 2027
TBC

| Bristol Bears | – | Sale Sharks |

Shaftesbury Park

19/20/21 March 2027
TBC

| Trailfinders | – | Gloucester–Hartpury |

Trailfinders Sports Ground

19/20/21 March 2027
TBC

| Saracens | – | Harlequins |

StoneX Stadium

19/20/21 March 2027
TBC

| Leicester Tigers | – | Exeter Chiefs |

Welford Road

Bye/s: Loughborough Lightning

=== Round 16 ===
26/27/28 March 2027
TBC

| Gloucester–Hartpury | – | Leicester Tigers |

Kingsholm

26/27/28 March 2027
TBC

| Sale Sharks | – | Trailfinders |

Heywood Road

26/27/28 March 2027
TBC

| Loughborough Lightning | – | Bristol Bears |

Franklin's Gardens

26/27/28 March 2027
TBC

| Exeter Chiefs | – | Saracens |

Sandy Park

Bye/s: Harlequins

=== Round 17 ===
28/29/30 May 2027
TBC

| Exeter Chiefs | – | Gloucester–Hartpury |

Sandy Park

28/29/30 May 2027
TBC

| Saracens | – | Trailfinders |

StoneX Stadium

28/29/30 May 2027
TBC

| Leicester Tigers | – | Loughborough Lightning |

Welford Road

28/29/30 May 2027
TBC

| Harlequins | – | Sale Sharks |

Twickenham Stoop

Bye/s: Bristol Bears

=== Round 18 ===
4/5/6 June 2027
TBC

| Bristol Bears | – | Leicester Tigers |

Shaftesbury Park

4/5/6 June 2027
TBC

| Gloucester–Hartpury | – | Saracens |

Kingsholm

4/5/6 June 2027
TBC

| Sale Sharks | – | Exeter Chiefs |

Heywood Road

4/5/6 June 2027
TBC

| Loughborough Lightning | – | Harlequins |

Franklin's Gardens

Bye/s: Trailfinders

== Play-offs ==
As in previous seasons, the top four teams in the league table, following the conclusion of the regular season, will contest the play-off semi-finals in a 1st vs 4th and 2nd vs 3rd format, with the higher ranking team having home advantage. The two winners of the semi-finals will then meet in the final at a venue to be confirmed on 26 June 2027.

Semi-finals
12/13 June 2027
First in standings
Fourth in standings
12/13 June 2027
Second in standings
Third in standings

Final
26 June 2027 – TBC
Winner SF1
Winner SF2

=== Semi-finals ===
12/13 June 2027

| First in standings | – | Fourth in standings |

12/13 June 2027

| Second in standings | – | Third in standings |

=== Final ===
26 June 2027
TBC

| Winner SF1 | – | Winner SF2 |

TBC

== PWR Next Gen Cup ==
2026 PWR Next Gen Cup
- Countries: England
- Number of teams: 9
- Date: September – November 2026
- Champions: Trailfinders (1st title)
- Runners-up: Saracens
- Matches played: 19
- Tries scored: 189 (average 9.9 per match)

Official website
- www.thepwr.com

The pre-season cup competition will also return; like the 2025 edition, the cup competition will be complete before the league starts. The competition takes its new name of JAECOO PWR Next Gen Cup following the announcement of Jaecoo as the PWR's title partner from the 2026–27 season. Fixtures were confirmed on 3 June 2026. The nine PWR teams are split into two pools, based on the 2025–26 Premiership Women's Rugby season standings. Pool A contains five teams and Pool B contains four teams. Teams in Pool B will have bye weekends in Rounds 2 and 4. A reserve weekend is in place for the weekend of 24–25 October 2026. The top two teams from each pool will advance to the semi-finals, with the Pool A winner facing the Pool B runner-up and vice versa. The final will take place on the weekend of 7–8 November 2026.

=== Pool A ===
2026 PWR Cup Pool A table
| Pos | Team | Pld | W | D | L | PF | PA | PD | TF | TA | TB | LB | Pts | Qualification |
|---|---|---|---|---|---|---|---|---|---|---|---|---|---|---|
| 1 | Saracens (Q) | 4 | 4 | 0 | 0 | 206 | 36 | +170 | 32 | 6 | 4 | 0 | 20 | Play-offs |
| 2 | Sale Sharks (Q) | 4 | 3 | 0 | 1 | 128 | 79 | +49 | 21 | 12 | 3 | 0 | 15 | Play-offs |
| 3 | Exeter Chiefs | 4 | 2 | 0 | 2 | 145 | 114 | +31 | 23 | 19 | 2 | 0 | 10 | |
| 4 | Loughborough Lightning | 4 | 1 | 0 | 3 | 67 | 152 | −85 | 11 | 23 | 2 | 0 | 6 | |
| 5 | Leicester Tigers | 4 | 0 | 0 | 4 | 33 | 198 | −165 | 5 | 32 | 0 | 0 | 0 | |

Updated to match(es) played on 18 October 2026. Source: RFU
(Q) Qualified for the phase indicated

==== Round 1 ====
19 September 2026
14:00

| Leicester Tigers | 0–66 | Saracens (1 BP) |
| | Report | Try: Wright-Haley 4' c Bennett 13' c Fitzgerald 22' c Hardy 30' c Bridger 40+1' m Cleall 41' c Sharp (2) 44' m, 66' c McMillan 76' c Freeman 78' c Con: MacDougall (8/10) 5', 14', 23', 31', 41', 68', 77', 80' |

Welford Road

19 September 2026
14:00

| (1 BP) Sale Sharks | 34–26 | Loughborough Lightning (1 BP) |
| Try: Thorpe (2) 6' m, 72' m Aucken 10' c Hopkins 29' c Peirsegaele 38' c Con: Duffy (3/5) 11', 30', 39'; Pen: Duffy (1/1) 79' | Report | Try: Clist 15' m Tromans 34' c Layzell (2) 46' c, 69' c Con: Barnes (2/3) 35', 47'; MacColl (1/1) 70' |

Heywood Road
Referee: Andrew Wigley

Bye/s: Exeter Chiefs

==== Round 2 ====
27 September 2026
13:00

| (1 BP) Exeter Chiefs | 67–13 | Leicester Tigers |
| Try: Nigrelli 4' c Whiteley 15' m Ryall 23' m Dare 41' c Skeates 44' c Phillips 47' c Preece (3) 57' m, 67' m, 73' m Wood 62' c Harris 76' c Con: McGoverne (6/11) 5', 42', 45', 48', 63', 77' | Report | Try: Slater 65' m Labeyrie 69' m Pen: Evans (1/1) 8' |

Sandy Park
Referee: Harry Walbaum

27 September 2026
14:00

| (1 BP) Saracens | 26–12 | Sale Sharks |
| Try: Cleall 2' m Sellors 8' c Linkins 26' c Hardy 70' c Con: MacDougall (3/4) 9', 27', 71' | Report | Try: Hopkins 22' m Penalty try 60' |

StoneX Stadium
Referee: Nicola O'Donnell

Bye/s: Loughborough Lightning

==== Round 3 ====
2 October 2026
19:30

| Loughborough Lightning | 5–66 | Saracens (1 BP) |
| Try: Morall 57' m | Report | Try: Sharp (2) 2' c, 9' c Boatman (2) 5' m, 68' c Gregson (2) 24' c, 79' c Crake 40+1' m Bridger 44' c Cleall 50' c Campbell 64' c Con: MacDougall (8/10) 3', 10', 25', 45', 51', 65', 69', 80' |

Goldington Road
Referee: Matthew Sharpe

3 October 2026
14:00

| Sale Sharks | 41–17 | Exeter Chiefs |
| Try: Thorpe 6' c Childs (3) 17' m, 21' c, 57' m Hyndman 28' m Hopkins 47' m Heard 73' c Con: Goulden (2/5) 7', 22'; Rigoni (1/2) 74' | Report | Try: Skeates 9' m Wills 31' c Phillips 67' m Con: McGoverne (1/3) 32' |

Heywood Road

Bye/s: Leicester Tigers

==== Round 4 ====
10 October 2026
15:00

| (1 BP) Exeter Chiefs | 42–12 | Loughborough Lightning |
| Try: Whitley 7' c Fuente 40+5' c Skeates 41' c E. Robinson 47' c Sams 57' c Elworthy 75' c Con: McGoverne (6/6) 8', 40+6', 42', 48', 58', 76' | Report | Try: Tromans 29' m Williams 59' c Con: Tromans (1/2) 60' |

Sandy Park

10 October 2026
15:00

| Leicester Tigers | 10–41 | Sale Sharks (1 BP) |
| Try: Lingham 5' c Con: Feury (1/1) 6'; Pen: Feury (1/2) 29' | Report | Try: Hyndman (2) 11' m, 51' m Hopkins (2) 17' c, 80' m Thorpe 46' m Fray 57' c Kasolo 70' c Con: Goulden (3/7) 18', 58', 71' |

Burton RFC
Referee: Emily Hope

Bye/s: Saracens

==== Round 5 ====
17 October 2026
14:00

| (1 BP) Loughborough Lightning | 24–10 | Leicester Tigers |
| Try: Tromans 11' m Clifford 41' c Baynes 53' m Kelly 64' c Con: Barnes (2/4) 42', 65' | Report | Try: Farmer 59' m Tuima 73' m |

Loughborough University
Referee: Rosanna Procter

17 October 2026
14:00

| (1 BP) Saracens | 48–19 | Exeter Chiefs |
| Try: Sellors 7' m Freeman 22' c Verghese 34' c Cleall 48' m Wright-Haley 66' c Gondwe (2) 71' m, 75' c Moss 80+1' m Con: MacDougall (4/8) 23', 35', 67', 76' | Report | Try: Whitley 10' c E. Robinson 37' c Wills 54' m Con: McGoverne (2/3) 11', 38' |

StoneX Stadium
Referee: Alexander Thomas

Bye/s: Sale Sharks

=== Pool B ===
2026 PWR Cup Pool B table
| Pos | Team | Pld | W | D | L | PF | PA | PD | TF | TA | TB | LB | Pts | Qualification |
|---|---|---|---|---|---|---|---|---|---|---|---|---|---|---|
| 1 | Trailfinders (Q) | 3 | 3 | 0 | 0 | 170 | 52 | +118 | 28 | 8 | 3 | 0 | 15 | Play-offs |
| 2 | Bristol Bears (Q) | 3 | 2 | 0 | 1 | 131 | 71 | +60 | 21 | 11 | 3 | 1 | 12 | Play-offs |
| 3 | Gloucester–Hartpury | 3 | 1 | 0 | 2 | 94 | 131 | −37 | 14 | 21 | 1 | 0 | 5 | |
| 4 | Harlequins | 3 | 0 | 0 | 3 | 62 | 203 | −141 | 10 | 33 | 1 | 0 | 1 | |

Updated to match(es) played on 18 October 2026. Source: RFU
(Q) Qualified for the phase indicated

==== Round 1 ====
19 September 2026
13:00

| (2 BP) Bristol Bears | 24–28 | Trailfinders (1 BP) |
| Try: Lovibond (2) 1' c, 23' m Evans 10' c Phillips 46' m Con: Green (2/4) 1', 10' | Report | Try: Long 16' c Collingbourne 42' c McQuade 73' c Sharpe 77' c Con: Inman (4/4) 16', 43', 74', 78' |

North Bristol RFC
Referee: Charles Gayther

19 September 2026
13:30

| Harlequins | 19–68 | Gloucester–Hartpury (1 BP) |
| Try: Charlesworth 4' c Keel 8' c Z. Green 63' m Con: Cromack (2/2) 5', 8' | Report | Try: M. Green 12' c Pritchard 17' c Hughes 20' c Brock (2) 29' c, 45' c Simpson 40' c Clarke (2) 59' c, 69' c Davies 66' c Kidd 77' m Con: E. Green (9/10) 13', 18', 21', 30', 40+1', 46', 60', 67', 70' |

Twickenham Stoop
Referee: Matthew Sharpe

==== Round 3 ====
3 October 2026
13:00

| (1 BP) Bristol Bears | 47–19 | Gloucester–Hartpury |
| Try: David 7' c Phillips 30' c Bonner (2) 38' c, 60' m Marston-Mulhearn 43' c Pashaei-Tarighoun 47' c Hendy 74' c Con: L. Green (6/7) 8', 31', 39', 44', 48', 75' | Report | Try: Davies 10' c Sing (2) 16' m, 64' c Con: E. Green (2/3) 11', 65' |

North Bristol RFC
Referee: Emily Hope

3 October 2026
15:00

| (1 BP) Trailfinders | 77–19 | Harlequins |
| Try: McQuade (2) 4' m, 72' m Cooksey 7' m Ashworth 21' m Down 22' m Tui (2) 29' c, 77' c Westcombe-Evans (2) 33' m, 66' m Jones 48' c Inman 55' c Bradley 59' c Tuffnail 63' c Con: Inman (6/13) 30', 49', 56', 60', 64', 78' | Report | Try: Meuller 36' c Okechukwu 40' m Parry 61' c Con: Cromack (1/3) 37', 62' |

Trailfinders Sports Ground
Referee: Nicola O'Donnell

==== Round 5 ====
17 October 2026
14:00

| (1 BP) Harlequins | 24–58 | Bristol Bears (1 BP) |
| Try: Z. Green 32' c Shillaker (2) 35' m, 62' c Whyte 72' m Con: Cromack (2/4) 33', 63' | Report | Try: Atkin-Davies (2) 20' m, 27' m Phillips (3) 38' m, 53' c, 57' m Marston-Mulhearn 40+1' c L. Green 49' c Murray 59' c Jacques 67' m David 80+4' m Con: L. Green (4/8) 40+2', 50', 54', 60' |

Twickenham Stoop

18 October 2026
14:00

| Gloucester–Hartpury | 7–65 | Trailfinders (1 BP) |
| Try: Bunker 79' c Con: Green (1/1) 80' | Report | Try: Down (2) 5' c, 26' m Bradley 7' c Kalounivale 19' c C. Gallagher 34' m Tui (2) 44' m, 60' m McQuade 52' c White 57' c Apiafi 67' m Inman 73' m Con: Brookes (5/11) 6', 8', 20', 53', 58' |

Hartpury Stadium
Referee: Michael Lamb

=== Play-offs ===
==== Semi-finals ====
31 October 2026
12:00

| Trailfinders | 33–14 | Sale Sharks |
| Try: Ashworth 26' m White 56' c Cooksey 59' c Prins 71' c Montiel 80' c Con: Brookes (4/5) 57', 60', 72', 80+1' | Report | Try: Kasolo (2) 13' c, 20' c Con: Goulden (2/2) 14', 21' |

Trailfinders Sports Ground

31 October 2026
18:00

| Saracens | 42–26 | Bristol Bears |
| Try: Freeman (2) 23' c, 41' c Gregson (2) 31' c, 67' c Hardy 36' c Cleall 72' c Con: MacDougall (6/6) 24', 32', 37', 42', 68', 73' | Report | Try: Atkin-Davies (2) 1' c, 56' c Pashaei-Tarighoun 11' m Marston-Mulhearn 63' c Con: Hesketh (3/4) 2', 57', 64' |

StoneX Stadium
Referee: Emily Hope

==== Final ====
7 November 2026
18:00

| Saracens | 21–22 | Trailfinders |
| Try: Freeman 16' c Sellors 31' c Moss 74' c Con: MacDougall (3/3) 17', 32', 75' | Report | Try: Swailes (2) 11' c, 53' m Meta 65' m Bradley 70' m Con: Brookes (1/4) 12' |

StoneX Stadium
Referee: Charles Gayther
