= Slater Cup =

Rugby competition between Gloucester and Leicester Tigers

The Slater Cup is the trophy awarded to the winner of the rugby match between Gloucester Rugby and Leicester Tigers twice every season in Premiership Rugby. It is named after Ed Slater, the former captain of both clubs, who was forced to retire in July 2022 after being diagnosed with Motor Neurone Disease (MND). The inaugural edition was played in the 2022–23 season and was won by Leicester Tigers. The trophy extends to Premiership Women's Rugby, featuring Gloucester–Hartpury and Leicester Tigers Women. The inaugural women's edition was played in the 2023–24 season.

== History ==
In November 2022, Gloucester Rugby and Leicester Tigers announced that they would compete for a trophy named after Ed Slater. Slater played for and captained both clubs but was forced to retire in July 2022 after a diagnosis of Motor Neurone Disease.

In February 2023, Gloucester Rugby announced that for the first Slater Cup game played at Kingsholm they would play in a limited edition Slater Cup shirt. The shirt was designed by Ed Slater, his wife Jo, and their three children. The club also announced that £10 from every shirt sold would go directly to the family to aid Ed's treatment and help fund adaptations to his home, while also providing financial support to his young family. The shirt was also designed to raise awareness of MND.

The third men's edition and the first women's edition of the Slater Cup were played as a double-header at Kingsholm on 25 November 2023, with the men's game first followed by the inaugural women's Slater Cup, a Premiership Women's Rugby game between Gloucester–Hartpury and Leicester Tigers Women. Both Gloucester teams wore the limited edition Slater Cup shirt designed by Ed and his family.

The second Slater Cup of the 2025–26 season was staged away from Kingsholm and Welford Road for the first time, with the match taking place at Villa Park, Birmingham, on 28 March 2026, as part of Premiership Rugby's Big Match Bonanza. Ahead of the fixture, a charity cycle race was organised in aid of the 4ED Foundation and Lewis Moody, with riders from both clubs racing approximately 45 miles from Welford Road and Kingsholm respectively to Villa Park. The teams will be captained by Martin Johnson (Leicester Tigers) and Mike Tindall (Gloucester Rugby). £1 from every match ticket also donated to the 4ED Foundation. Both clubs produced special edition shirts for the match, Gloucester's 4ED shirt featured elements hand-drawn by Ed Slater's children, with a £10 donation made per shirt to the 4ED charity. Both Gloucester and Gloucester–Hartpury will wear the kit. Leicester's special edition shirt celebrates the city's cultural diversity and the Golden Mile's South Asian heritage, with 10% of sales donated to 4ED.

== Men's Cup ==
Men's Slater Cup
- Sport: Rugby union
- Competition: Premiership Rugby
- Awarded for: Winner of Gloucester vs Leicester Tigers

History
- First award: 24 December 2022; 3 years, 291 days ago
- Editions: 9
- Most wins: Leicester Tigers (7)
- Most recent: Leicester Tigers (9 October 2026) 2 days ago

=== Results summary ===
Cup wins/holds
Team	Gms.
Gloucester Rugby	2
Leicester Tigers	7

Match wins
Team	Wins
Gloucester Rugby	2
Leicester Tigers	7
Draws	0

Season	Date	Home	Score	Away	Stadium and location	Holder (aggregate times held)	Refs
2022–23	24 December 2022	Leicester Tigers	28–13	Gloucester	Welford Road, Leicester	Leicester (1)	
2022–23	12 March 2023	Gloucester	5–26	Leicester Tigers	Kingsholm Stadium, Gloucester	Leicester (2)	
2023–24	25 November 2023	Gloucester	20–38	Leicester Tigers	Kingsholm Stadium, Gloucester	Leicester (3)	
2023–24	22 March 2024	Leicester Tigers	25–27	Gloucester	Welford Road, Leicester	Gloucester (1)	
2024-25	20 October 2024	Leicester Tigers	29–26	Gloucester	Welford Road, Leicester	Leicester (4)	
2024-25	25 January 2025	Gloucester	38–31	Leicester Tigers	Kingsholm Stadium, Gloucester	Gloucester (2)	
2025-26	19 December 2025	Leicester Tigers	45–14	Gloucester	Welford Road, Leicester	Leicester (5)	
2025-26	28 March 2026	Gloucester	17–36	Leicester Tigers	Villa Park, Birmingham	Leicester (6)	
2026-27	9 October 2026	Leicester Tigers	38–30	Gloucester	Welford Road, Leicester	Leicester (7)	

=== Match details ===
Notes

- Referees appointed to officiate Premiership matches are employed by the RFU, unless indicated otherwise.

==== 1st edition ====
24 December 2022
15:00

Leicester Tigers	28–13	Gloucester
Try: G. Porter 44' c A. Watson (2) 58' c, 66' m Con: Burns (2/3) 45', 59'; Pen: Burns (3/3) 13', 19', 54'	Report	Try: Tuisue 40+2' m May 79' m Con: Hastings (0/1); L. Evans (0/1); Pen: Hastings (1/2) 8'

Welford Road
Attendance: 22,000
Referee: Christophe Ridley

==== 2nd edition ====
12 March 2023
13:00

Gloucester	5–26	Leicester Tigers (1 BP)
Try: May 63' m Con: S. Carreras (0/1)	Report	Try: Brown 55' m Montoya 59' c Youngs 72' c J. Wiese 80+1' c Con: Pollard (3/4) 60', 73', 80+3'

Kingsholm
Attendance: 13,623
Referee: Ian Tempest

==== 3rd edition ====
25 November 2023
14:30

Gloucester	20–38	Leicester Tigers (1 BP)
Try: McGuigan 49' c Ford-Robinson 66' c Con: Barton (2/2) 50', 67'; Pen: Barton (2/5) 16', 28'	Report	Try: Hassell-Collins (2) 38' m, 60' c Montoya 54' c Kata 80+2' c Con: Pollard (3/4) 55', 61', 80+3'; Pen: Pollard (4/4) 2', 31', 35', 71'

Kingsholm
Referee: Tom Foley

==== 4th edition ====
22 March 2024
19:45

(2 BP) Leicester Tigers	25–27	Gloucester
Try: Reffell 39' m Kata 42' m J. Wiese 55' m Shillcock 71' c Con: Shillcock (1/4) 72'; Pen: Shillcock (1/1) 21'	Report	Try: Mercer 28' c C. Harris 35' c Varney 77' c Con: S. Carreras (3/3) 29', 36', 78'; Pen: S. Carreras (2/2) 33', 47'

Welford Road
Referee: Matthew Carley

==== 5th edition ====
20 October 2024
15:00

(1 BP) Leicester Tigers	29–26	Gloucester (2 BP)
Try: Hassell-Collins 21' m Pollard 42' c Bassett 48' c Kelly 65' c Con: Pollard (3/4) 43', 49', 66'; Pen: Pollard (1/1) 5'	Report	Try: Llewellyn (3) 9' c, 37' m, 71' c F. Thomas 12' c Con: Carreras (3/4) 10', 13', 72'

Welford Road
Referee: Hamish Smales

==== 6th edition ====
25 January 2025
15:05

(1 BP) Gloucester	38–31	Leicester Tigers (2 BP)
Try: T. Williams 12' c Carreras 28' c Clement 51' c Harris 55' c Blake 59' c Con: Carreras (5/5) 12', 29', 52', 56', 60'; Pen: Carreras (1/1) 40+1'	Report	Try: Perese 8' c Brown 19' c Radwan 38' c Wells 42' c Con: Pollard (4/4) 9', 20', 39', 43'; Pen: Pollard (1/1) 77'

Kingsholm
Referee: Ben O'Keeffe (New Zealand)

==== 7th edition ====
19 December 2025
19:45

(1 BP) Leicester Tigers	45–14	Gloucester
Try: Thompson 11' c Kata 20' m Penalty try 39'; Whiteley 40' c Reffell 49' m Searle 62' c Chessum 71' c Con: Searle (3/5) 12', 41', 63'; Bailey (1/1) 72'	Report	Try: Hathaway 57' c Clement 74' c Con: Byrne (2/2) 58', 75'

Welford Road
Referee: Karl Dickson

==== 8th edition ====
28 March 2026
13:00

Gloucester	17–36	Leicester Tigers (1 BP)
Try: Alemanno 21' m Joseph 42' c Bleuler 72' m Con: Atkinson	Report	Try: Wand 1' c Hamer-Webb 5' m Blamire (2) 11' m, 15' m Bailey 39' c Wells 77' c Con: Searle (2/5) 2', 40'; O'Connor (1/1) 78'

Villa Park, Birmingham
Referee: Matthew Carley

==== 9th edition ====
9 October 2026
19:45 BST

(1 BP) Leicester Tigers	38–31	Gloucester (2 BP)
Try: Carnduff 14' c Heyes 28' c Blamire 35' c Wainwright 50' c Hassell-Collins 69' c Con: Searle (5/5) 15', 29', 35', 51', 70'; Pen: Searle (1/1) 47'	Report	Try: Morgan 3' c Bleuler 8' c Trenholm 59' c Innard 79' c Con: Englefield (2/2) 4', 9'; Barton (2/2) 60', 79'; Pen: Barton (1/1) 80+2'

Welford Road
Referee: Karl Dickson

=== Records ===
The most points scored in a Slater Cup fixture is 18, set by Handré Pollard in the 3rd edition and matched by Santiago Carreras in the 6th edition. Pollard scored 3 conversions and 4 penalties, while Carreras scored 1 try, 1 penalty and 5 conversions. The most tries scored in a single Slater Cup fixture is 3, held by Max Llewellyn, set in the 5th edition.

- Longest winning streak: 3 – Leicester Tigers (1st–3rd & 7th–9th editions)
- Longest losing streak: 3 – Gloucester (1st–3rd & 7th–9th editions)
- Biggest winning margin: 31 points – Leicester 45–14 Gloucester, 19 December 2025
- Smallest winning margin: 2 points – Leicester 25–27 Gloucester, 22 March 2024

== Women's Cup ==
Women's Slater Cup
- Sport: Rugby union
- Competition: Premiership Women's Rugby
- Awarded for: Winner of Gloucester–Hartpury vs Leicester Tigers

History
- First award: 25 November 2023; 2 years, 320 days ago
- Editions: 6
- Most wins: Gloucester–Hartpury (6)
- Most recent: Gloucester–Hartpury (29 March 2026) 196 days ago

=== Results summary ===
Cup wins/holds
Team	Gms.
Gloucester–Hartpury	6
Leicester Tigers	0

Match wins
Team	Wins
Gloucester–Hartpury	5
Leicester Tigers	0
Draws	0

Season	Date	Home	Score	Away	Stadium and location	Holder (aggregate times held)	Refs
2023–24	25 November 2023	Gloucester–Hartpury	52–14	Leicester Tigers	Kingsholm Stadium, Gloucester	Gloucester–Hartpury (1)	
2023–24	3 February 2024	Leicester Tigers	26–33	Gloucester–Hartpury	Welford Road, Leicester	Gloucester–Hartpury (2)	
2024–25	6 October 2024	Gloucester–Hartpury	57–29	Leicester Tigers	Kingsholm Stadium, Gloucester	Gloucester–Hartpury (3)	
2024–25	1 February 2025	Leicester Tigers	7–38	Gloucester–Hartpury	Welford Road, Leicester	Gloucester–Hartpury (4)	
2025–26	21 December 2025	Leicester Tigers	12–75	Gloucester–Hartpury	Welford Road, Leicester	Gloucester–Hartpury (5)	
2025–26	29 March 2026	Gloucester–Hartpury	51–14	Leicester Tigers	Kingsholm Stadium, Gloucester	Gloucester–Hartpury (6)	

=== Match details ===
==== 1st edition ====
25 November 2023
17:30

(1 BP) Gloucester–Hartpury	52 – 14	Leicester Tigers Women
Try: Brock 4' c Taylor 10' c Perry 16' c Beckett 20' c Venner (2) 26' c, 59' m Sing 40' m N. Jones 47' c Con: Sing (6/8) 5', 11', 17', 21', 27', 48'	Report	Try: Feury 71' c M. Jones 74' c Con: M. Jones (2/2) 72', 75'

Kingsholm
Referee: Alex Thomas

==== 2nd edition ====
3 February 2024
12:30

(2 BP) Leicester Tigers Women	26 – 33	Gloucester–Hartpury (1 BP)
Try: McBrien 11' c M. Jones 18' c McGhie 40' m Tutt 42' c Con: M. Jones (3/4) 12', 19', 43'	Report	Try: Lake 31' c Matthews 48' c Richards (2) 58' m, 63' c Sing 75' c Con: George (4/5) 32', 49', 64', 76'

Welford Road
Referee: Holly Wood

==== 3rd edition ====
6 October 2024
12:45

(1 BP) Gloucester–Hartpury	57–29	Leicester Tigers (1 BP)
Try: Hopkins 19' c Dale (2) 25' m, 40+2' c Sing (2) 35' c, 37' c Lund 54' m Woodman (2) 56' c, 59' m Shekells 63' c Con: Sing (6/9) 20', 36', 38', 40+3', 57', 64'	Report	Try: Fray 3' m Alema 21' c Wills 31' m Beaver (2) 52' m, 65' c Con: Nicholas (1/4) 22'; Mundy (1/1) 66'

Kingsholm
Referee: Mike Hudson

==== 4th edition ====
1 February 2025
12:00

Leicester Tigers	7–38	Gloucester–Hartpury (1 BP)
Try: Gallagher 40' c Con: Gallagher (1/1) 40+1'	Report	Try: Davies 13' m Castellucci 17' c Penalty try 39'; H. Jones 50' m Buggy 61' c Boag 73' c Con: Sing (3/5) 18', 62', 74'

Welford Road
Referee: Ben Simpson

==== 5th edition ====
21 December 2025
15:00

Leicester Tigers	12–75	Gloucester–Hartpury (1 BP)
Try: Penalty try 6'; Russell 70' m	Report	Try: Sing (2) 2' c, 79' c Williams (2) 11' c, 32' c Venner (2) 24' c, 46' c Pyrs 39' c Copson 56' c Dallavalle (2) 66' c, 80+2' m Shekells 73' c Con: Sing (10/11) 3', 12', 25', 33', 40', 47', 57', 67', 74', 80'

Welford Road
Referee: Matthew Sharpe

==== 6th edition ====
29 March 2026
14:30

(1 BP) Gloucester–Hartpury	51–14	Leicester Tigers
Try: Venner (2) 1' m, 54' m Lund (2) 13' c, 74' m Pritchard 22' m Tuipulotu 22' c Blackburn 40' c Copson (2) 42' m, 66' m Con: Sing (3/5) 14', 23', 40+1'	Report	Try: Lingham 9' c McCalman 39' c Con: Feury (2/2) 10', 39'

Kingsholm
Referee: Andy Wigley

=== Records ===
The record for most points scored by a player in a single Women's Slater Cup game was set by Emma Sing in the 5th edition in December 2025, when she scored 30 points (2 tries and 10 conversions).

- Longest winning streak: 5 – Gloucester–Hartpury (all five editions to date)
- Longest losing streak: 5 – Leicester Tigers (all five editions to date)
- Biggest winning margin: 63 points – Leicester 12–75 Gloucester–Hartpury, 21 December 2025
- Smallest winning margin: 7 points – Leicester 26–33 Gloucester–Hartpury, 3 February 2024
