= Courtney Keight =

Wales international rugby union player

- Born: 27 December 1997 (age 28) Oxford, England
- Height: 168 cm (5 ft 6 in)
- Weight: 74 kg (163 lb)
- School: Ysgol Greenhill School
- University: Swansea University

Rugby union career
- Position: Outside Center
- Current team: Bristol Bears
Senior career
Years	Team	Apps	(Points)
- Swansea RFC
- Pontarddulais RFC
2020–2025	Bristol Bears		
2025–	Sale Sharks		
International career
Years	Team	Apps	(Points)
2019–	Wales	28	(0)
- Correct as of 24 September 2025

Courtney Keight (born 27 December 1997) is a Welsh Rugby Union player who plays Outside Center for the Wales women's national rugby union team and Bristol Bears. She made her debut for the Wales national squad in 2019 and represented them at the 2021 Women's Six Nations Championship.

== Club career ==
Keight began playing rugby relatively late compared to her counterparts, first picking up the ball in 2016 while studying at Swansea University. After playing centre for Swansea University RFC, Keight then joined Pontarddulais RFC, and later, Swansea RFC.

She signed Bristol Bears Women as winger in July 2020. She stayed at Bristol until the end of the 2024–25 Premiership Women's Rugby season. It was then announced that she had signed for Sale Sharks for the 2025–26 Premiership Women's Rugby season.

== International career ==
Keight caught the eye of talent scouts during a cup final for Swansea at the Principality Stadium in April 2019, and was subsequently asked to play sevens for Wales. After a brief period playing for the Ospreys, Keight was then invited to train with the Wales autumn squad, and made her international debut on the wing in a match against Ireland during the 2019 Autumn Internationals.

Keight was part of the 2020 Women's Six Nations squad, and made her first start for the team in 2021. She was named in the Welsh side for the 2025 Six Nations Championship on 4 March 2025.

On 11 August 2025, she was selected in the Welsh squad to the Women's Rugby World Cup in England.

== Personal life ==
Keight attended Ysgol Greenhill School as a child, before commencing undergraduate study at Swansea University.
