= Mikiela Nelson =

Canada international rugby union player

- Born: 27 November 1997 (age 28)
- Height: 1.7 m (5 ft 7 in)
- Weight: 102 kg (225 lb)

Rugby union career
- Position: Prop
- Current team: Exeter Chiefs
Senior career
Years	Team	Apps	(Points)
2024–	Exeter Chiefs	10	(25)
International career
Years	Team	Apps	(Points)
2021–	Canada	11	(15)
Medal record
Women's rugby union
Representing Canada
World Cup
Silver medal – second place	2025 England	Team competition

Mikiela Anakaye Nelson (born 27 November 1997) is a Canadian rugby union player. She competed for Canada at the delayed 2021 Rugby World Cup.

== Rugby career ==
Nelson competed for Canada at the delayed 2021 Rugby World Cup in New Zealand. She scored a try in Canada's opening match against Japan. She also scored a try against the United States.

She joined Exeter Chiefs in the Premiership Women's Rugby competition at the start of the 2024–25 season. She previously played for Capilano Rugby Football Club in Canada.

She was selected in Canada's squad for the 2025 Pacific Four Series. On 24 July, she was selected in the Canadian side to the Rugby World Cup in England.

She started her rugby career playing for Vancouver Rowing Club Women's Rugby team before moving up to the Top Division in British Columbia for women's rugby.
