= Danelle Lochner =

South African rugby union player

- Born: 16 May 1997 (age 29)
- Height: 184 cm (6 ft 0 in)
- Weight: 82 kg (181 lb)

Rugby union career
- Position: Lock
Senior career
Years	Team	Apps	(Points)
2023	Western Province		
2023–	Harlequins		
International career
Years	Team	Apps	(Points)
2023–	South Africa	23	(15)
- Correct as of 22 September 2025
- Netball career
- Playing position: Goal shooter
Years	National team	Caps
2016–2017	South Africa U21	
2017–2019	South Africa	

Danelle Lochner (born 16 May 1997), is a South African rugby union player. She regularly plays as a Lock. She plays internationally for South Africa and for Harlequins in the Premiership Women's Rugby competition. She competed for South Africa in the 2025 Women's Rugby World Cup. She has also represented South Africa in netball.

== Netball career ==
Lochner was born on 16 May 1997. She first played netball, for which she was an international from 2016 to 2019, before an ankle injury interrupted her career. After the COVID-19 crisis, she took up netball again along with rugby sevens.

== Rugby career ==
When she started playing rugby sevens, she was immediately noticed; she was called up to the Springbok Women's team even though she had never played at the provincial level. On 26 March 2023, she played her first international match with the Springboks in Madrid against Canada.

In August 2023, she was selected to compete in the first edition of the WXV. After the competition, she went to play in England, with the Harlequins, where she meets her compatriots Babalwa Latsha and Aseza Hele.

In 2024–2025, Danelle Lochner is again selected for the WXV.

She was named in South Africa's squad for the 2025 Women's Rugby World Cup in England.
