= Megan Davies (rugby union) =

Wales international rugby union player

- Born: 19 January 2002 (age 24) Cardiff, South Wales
- Height: 160 cm (5 ft 3 in)
- Weight: 69 kg (152 lb; 10 st 12 lb)

Rugby union career
- Position: Scrum half
- Current team: Gloucester-Hartpury
Amateur team(s)
Years	Team	Apps	(Points)
- Cardiff quins
Senior career
Years	Team	Apps	(Points)
2020-2021	Gloucester-Hartpury		(0)
2019–2020	Exeter Chiefs		(0)
2022–2024	Bristol Bears		(0)
2024–	Gloucester-Hartpury		(5)
International career
Years	Team	Apps	(Points)
2021–	Wales	9	(0)
- Correct as of 24 September 2025
National sevens team
Years	Team		Comps
2022	Wales		Wales

Megan Davies (born 19 January 2002) is a Welsh rugby union player who plays scrum half for the Wales women's national rugby union team and Gloucester-Hartpury.

== Club career ==
Davies began playing rugby aged eight, initially with the Rumney Juniors boys side at Cardiff's Rumney Rugby Club, and then with Cardiff Quins, a girls team.

She was selected to play for Cardiff Blues under-18s and Wales Emerging Under-20s, before representing her country at under-18 level and in Rugby sevens in Poland. She also took part in the Touch World Cup in Kuala Lumpur in 2019.

After playing for Gloucester-Hartpury, Davies signed as an apprentice player with Exeter Chiefs in 2020. She made her debut for the club in a home game against Saracens, where Exeter's victory ended a 33-game unbeaten run for the defending Allianz Premier 15s champions.

In the summer of 2022, Davies signed for Bristol Bears. After two years there, she returned to Gloucester-Hartpury, under coach Sean Lynn.

== International career ==
Davies made her international debut for Wales at the 2021 Women's Six Nations Championship. She was called into the squad to replace Bristol Bears' Keira Bevan, who had suffered a leg injury. She made her first start for the team in Wales' subsequent match against Scotland, winning her first cap at the age of 19.

Davies has won seven caps in her rugby career. In 2023 she was one of three women who were awarded full-time professional contracts for Wales ahead of the WXV1 tournament in New Zealand. At the end of her season with Gloucester-Hartpury, Davies was approached by Exeter Chiefs' coach Susie Appleby, who offered her a rugby apprenticeship which involved playing rugby for the club and attending a college coaching course.

Davies was named in the Welsh side for the 2025 Six Nations Championship. In 2025, she was also selected for the Welsh squad for the 2025 Women's Rugby World Cup.
