= Sofia Stefan =

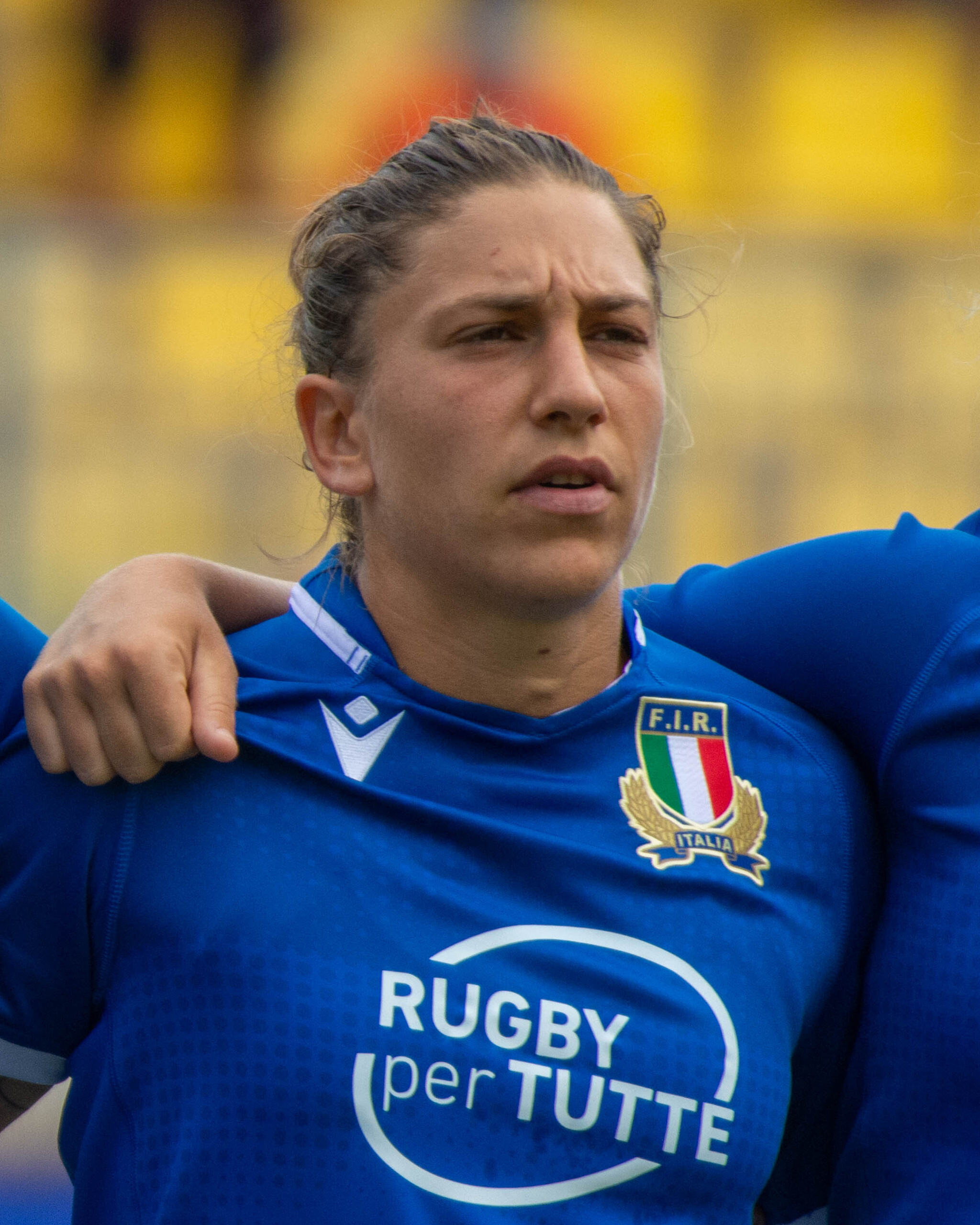
- Stefan in 2021
- Born: 12 May 1992 (age 34) Padua, Italy
- Height: 165 cm (5 ft 5 in)
- Weight: 59 kg (130 lb; 9 st 4 lb)

Rugby union career
- Position: Scrum-half
Senior career
Years	Team	Apps	(Points)
2010–2013	Valsugana		(0)
2013–2018	Stade Rennais		(0)
2018–?	Valsugana		(0)
2024-2025	Sale Sharks		
2025-	Toulon Provence Méditerranée		
International career
Years	Team	Apps	(Points)
2011–	Italy	101	(95)
National sevens team
Years	Team		Comps
2013–	Italy		

Sofia Stefan (born 12 May 1992) is an Italian rugby union player. She plays as a Scrum-half at an international level for Italy's national women's team, she also plays as a Wing or Centre.

== Rugby career ==
Stefan, originally from Padua but raised between Vigodarzere and Camposampiero, where she completed her high school studies. She came into rugby relatively late, around the age of 17, when she joined Valsugana.

She immediately came to prominence at a national level and made her international debut in the Italian women's team at the 2011 FIRA Women's European Trophy competition.

In 2012 she took part in the European Championship in Italy, finishing third after England and France. The following year she was selected for the national seven-a-side team that took part in the 2013 Summer Universiade competition in Kazan, Russia, where Italy won silver, they were beaten 10–30 in the final by Russia.

In the summer of 2013 she moved to France to play for Stade Rennais, while at the same time undertaking studies in motor sciences at the Rennes 2 University. She was one of the crucial players in Italy's qualification for the 2017 Women's Rugby World Cup, they obtained four victories, two each against Wales and Scotland in the Six Nations of 2015 and 2016 (a fifth, against France in 2015, which was irrelevant for the purposes of qualification), she was one of the 28 athletes called up for the world championship in Ireland, albeit in the role of wing or centre.

In 2023 she was awarded the International Rugby Players Women's Try of the Year for her try against Ireland during the Women's Six Nations Championship.

Stefan joined English club, Sale Sharks, for the 2024–25 Premiership Women's Rugby season. She was named in Italy's squad for the 2025 Women's Six Nations Championship.

On 11 August 2025, she was named in the Italian side to the Women's Rugby World Cup in England.
