= Kayleigh Powell =

Wales international rugby union player

- Born: 18 February 1999 (age 27) Church Village
- Height: 1.57 m (5 ft 2 in)
- Weight: 69 kg (152 lb)

Rugby union career
- Position(s): Fly-half; Full-back
- Current team: Harlequins Women
Senior career
Years	Team	Apps	(Points)
–2020	Ospreys		
2020−2024	Bristol Bears		
2024–	Harlequins Women		
International career
Years	Team	Apps	(Points)
2019–	Wales	28	(10)
National sevens teams
Years	Team		Comps
2022–	Wales		
2015–	Great Britain		

Kayleigh Powell (born 18 February 1999) is a Welsh rugby union player who plays Fly-half or full-back for the Wales women's national rugby union team, Team GB and Harlequins Women. She made her debut for the Wales national squad in 2019.

== Early life ==
Powell played football and cricket as well as rugby, whilst growing up at Llantrisant Primary School in Llantrisant. She played for Llantrisant rugby club between eight and twelve years old and later joined Pencoed. She played scrum-half until U18 level. She played cricket for Glamorgan at U12 level and up until 15 years-old played football for Mid Glamorgan.

== Career ==
She first played for Wales women's national rugby sevens team, representing Wales in the World Rugby Sevens Series and at the 2018 Commonwealth Games, before making her Wales women's national rugby union team 15-a-side debut against Ireland in November 2019.

Powell played club rugby for Ospreys Rugby in her home country of Wales. She joined Bristol Bears Women in June 2020. However, she missed the majority of 2021 with injury. She signed a semi-professional contract with Wales in January 2022.

In July 2022, she signed a full time contract with Welsh Rugby. She played at full-back for Wales at the delayed 2021 Rugby World Cup in October 2022.

She left the full-time Welsh Rugby 15s programme in November 2022 to join up with the Great Britain women's national rugby sevens team that was striving to qualify for the Paris Olympics. In August 2023, she agreed a hybrid contract with Team GB and Welsh Rugby.

She played for the Welsh 15s at the 2024 Women's Six Nations Championship.

In June 2024, she was named as a reserve for the British squad at the 2024 Olympic Games. During the tournament she was drafted in as a replacement for the injured Grace Crompton as the team finished seventh.

After the Olympics, she joined Harlequins Women. After playing ten matches for Quins at fly-half, she signed a contract extension with the club in February 2025. She was named in the Welsh side for the 2025 Six Nations Championship in March.

On 11 August 2025, she was selected in the Welsh squad to the Women's Rugby World Cup in England.
