= Christiana Balogun =

England international rugby union player

Rugby union career
- Position: Back row / Second row
- Current team: Bristol Bears Women
Senior career
Years	Team	Apps	(Points)
- Wasps
2022–	Bristol Bears Women		
International career
Years	Team	Apps	(Points)
- England

Christiana Balogun is an English rugby union player. She plays back-row forward for Bristol Bears Women in the Premier 15s and has been named in England squads.

== Club career ==
Balogun began her Premiership career at Wasps before joining Bristol Bears Women in 2022. She signed a new contract to remain at the club beyond the 2025–26 season.

== International career ==
Balogun was named in the England Red Roses squad for the 2026 Six Nations, one of seven uncapped players selected for the tournament.
