= Millie David =

English rugby union player (born 2005)

- Born: 15 June 2005 (age 21)

Rugby union career
- Position: Wing
- Current team: Bristol Bears
Senior career
Years	Team	Apps	(Points)
2024-	Bristol Bears		
International career
Years	Team	Apps	(Points)
2024-	England U20		
2026-	England		

Millie David (born 15 June 2005) is an English rugby union footballer who plays as a winger for Bristol Bears Women and England.

== Early life ==
From Wokingham, Berkshire, she began playing tag rugby in primary school with her classmates. She joined the Reading Rugby Club at the under-13 level.

== Club career ==
She was in the academy at Wasps Women prior to joining up with Bristol Bears Women. With Bristol, she reached the Premiership Women's Rugby final in 2024. The following season, she scored her 17th try of the season in the PWR semi-final. Her tally of tries in the league was the joint-highest in the season, with Saracens' May Campbell, and David was named that year’s PWR Breakthrough Player of the Season.

David continued with Bristol for the 2025-26 season, her performances including four tries in a match win against Leicester Tigers Women on 2 November 2025. In June 2026, she was named in the Rugby Players' Association’s Under-23 Team of the Season.

== International career ==
She made her first start for England U20 in May 2024. In March 2025, she was called into the senior England women's national rugby union team for the first time, ahead of the 2025 Women's Six Nations Championship. In June, Millie was named in the Red Roses' World Cup training squad as well as for the England U20 squad the 2025 Six Nations Women’s Summer Series. In March 2026, she was called-up again for the England team prior to the 2026 Women's Six Nations Championship. She had a try-scoring debut as a starter against Wales on 25 April 2026 at Ashton Gate.

== Personal life ==
Her father is Australian, and although he never played rugby, he did play Australian Rules Football. She has brothers who also played rugby union. She studied mathematics and attended the City of Oxford College, but had to request a dissertation deadline extension after being called-up to the England team. Due to her speed on the rugby field she has been nicknamed 'Millie Whizz'.
