= Simi Pam =

Bristol Bears womens rugby union player

- Born: 8 January 1995 (age 31)
- Height: 1.62 m (5 ft 4 in)
- Weight: 84 kg (185 lb)

Rugby union career
- Position: Prop
- Current team: Bristol
Senior career
Years	Team	Apps	(Points)
2019–	Bristol	108	

Simi Pam (born 8 January 1995) is an English-Nigerian rugby union prop who represents Bristol Bears Women in club rugby and is a training member for the England national team, the Red Roses, as well as working as a Doctor for the NHS.

== Early life and education ==
Simi Pam was born in Nigeria, and moved with her parents to the UK at the age of 3. After moving she played many sports, but it was only during her fifth year of university she began playing rugby.

== Club career ==
Pam joined Bristol in 2019, and has become a mainstay of their front row, including going viral for her highlight try after cantering down the wing, something very unusual for a player in her position.

She has also been notable for speaking out on the issue of black women's hair in rugby, and led her to a now iconic short hair look.

== International career ==
In 2024 Pam was first named in the training squad for England, and again in 2025 during the middle of the six nations.
