= Sean Lynn (rugby union) =

Welsh rugby union coach and former player

- Born: Swansea, Wales

Rugby union career
- Position: Scrum-half
- Current team: Wales Women (Head Coach)
Senior career
Years	Team	Apps	(Points)
- Gloucester Rugby U19
International career
Years	Team	Apps	(Points)
- Wales U18
- Wales Students
Coaching career
- Years: Team
- 2017–2020: Hereford RFC (Head Coach)
- –2019: Hartpury College and University (Head Coach)
- 2020–2025: Gloucester-Hartpury (Head Coach)
- 2025–: Wales Women (Head Coach)
- Correct as of 20 January 2025

Sean Lynn is a Welsh professional rugby union coach and former player who has been head coach of Welsh national women's rugby union team since 2025. He was head coach of English Premiership Women's Rugby side Gloucester-Hartpury from 2020 to 2025 and is most notable for coaching them to three consecutive Premiership Women's Rugby titles.

== Playing career ==
Lynn played Scrum-half for Wales Under-18 as well as the Welsh Student's team. He also played for the Gloucester Rugby Under 19s team.

== Coaching ==
=== Hereford RFC ===
Lynn was Head Coach at Hereford RFC from August 2017 to the end of the 2019–20 season.

=== Hartpury College and University ===
Lynn's combined his coach duties at Hereford with the Head Coach role at Hartpury College and University, where he led Hartpury University men's first team to three back-to-back BUCS Super Rugby titles.

=== Gloucester-Hartpury ===
In December 2019, Lynn was announced as Head of Women's Rugby at Hartpury College. He began the role in January 2020. This role saw him oversee the Women's Rugby pathway at Hartpury College and University as well as the head coach role at Gloucester-Hartpury. Lynn led Gloucester-Hartpury to three consecutive English titles, in the 2022–23, 2023–24 and 2024–25 seasons.

In January 2025, it was announced that Lynn would take up a role at the Welsh Rugby Union as head coach of the Wales Women national team. Lynn would continue as head coach of Gloucester-Hartpury alongside his new role with Wales. However, at the end of the English Premiership season in March, he would leave Gloucester-Hartpury to focus fully on his position with Wales. Lynn's last game in charge for Gloucester-Hartpury was the 2024–25 Premiership Women's Rugby Final, which they won 34–19 against Saracens.

=== Wales Women ===
In January 2025, it was announced that Lynn would become head coach of the Wales Women's senior side from mid-March onwards, taking up a position that had been vacant since November 2024. His first game in charge was against Scotland in the 2025 Women's Six Nations Championship.
