= Millie Hyett =

English rugby player

- Born: 28 April 2005 (age 21)
- Height: 1.77 m (5 ft 10 in)
- Weight: 78 kg (172 lb)
- School: Hartpury College
- University: Hartpury University

Rugby union career
- Position: Fly-half
- Current team: Gloucester–Hartpury
Senior career
Years	Team	Apps	(Points)
2024	Gloucester–Hartpury		
International career
Years	Team	Apps	(Points)
2024-2025	England U20		

Millie Hyett (born 28 April 2005) is an English rugby union footballer who plays for Gloucester–Hartpury. Her preferred position is fly-half.

== Early life ==
Hyett took up playing rugby union at the age of four years-old. She grew-up wity three brothers who all also played the sport. She played at Evesham Rugby Club in Worcestershire and attended Hartpury College and Hartpury University.

== Club career ==
A fly-half, she played for Worcester RFC prior to joining Gloucester–Hartpury. She played British Universities and Colleges Sport (BUCS) league rugby union for Hartpury. She made a try scoring debut for Gloucester-Hartpury in Premiership Women's Rugby on 11 February 2024 against Bristol. She was a member of the Gloucester-Hartpury squad which won league titles in the 2023-2024 and 2024–25 Premiership Women's Rugby seasons.

== International career ==
She captained the England U20 team at the 2025 Six Nations Women’s Summer Series.
