= Carys Phillips =

Wales international rugby union footballer

- Born: 12 November 1992 (age 34) Warrington, England
- Height: 170 cm (5 ft 7 in)
- Weight: 82 kg (181 lb)
- Notable relative: Rowland Phillips (father)

Rugby union career
- Position: Hooker
Amateur team(s)
Years	Team	Apps	(Points)
	Bristol Ladies		(0)
	Skewen RFC		(0)
	Ospreys		(0)
Senior career
Years	Team	Apps	(Points)
	Harlequins		(0)
International career
Years	Team	Apps	(Points)
2013–present	Wales	87	(95)
- Correct as of 24 September 2025

Carys Phillips (born 12 November 1992) is a Welsh rugby union player. She plays as a Hooker for the Harlequins in the Premier 15s and for Wales women's national rugby union team.

== Personal life ==
The daughter of back row forward Rowland Phillips, she studied at Llandovery College and took a course in Sports Coaching and Development at Cardiff Metropolitan University. She is an ambassador for the Red Kites Girls’ Rugby Cluster Centre, an organisation which lends its support to all-girls rugby.

== Rugby career ==
Phillips has played for Skewen RFC and also for Bristol Ladies, and Ospreys.

Phillips won her first international cap against Ireland in the first round of the 2013 Six Nations Championship. In 2016, She captained Wales in the second round of the Six Nations Championship.

Phillips was selected in Wales squad for the 2021 Rugby World Cup in New Zealand.

She was named in the Welsh side for the 2025 Six Nations Championship on 4 March 2025. She was later selected in the squad to the Women's Rugby World Cup in England.
