= Lark Atkin-Davies =

England international rugby union player

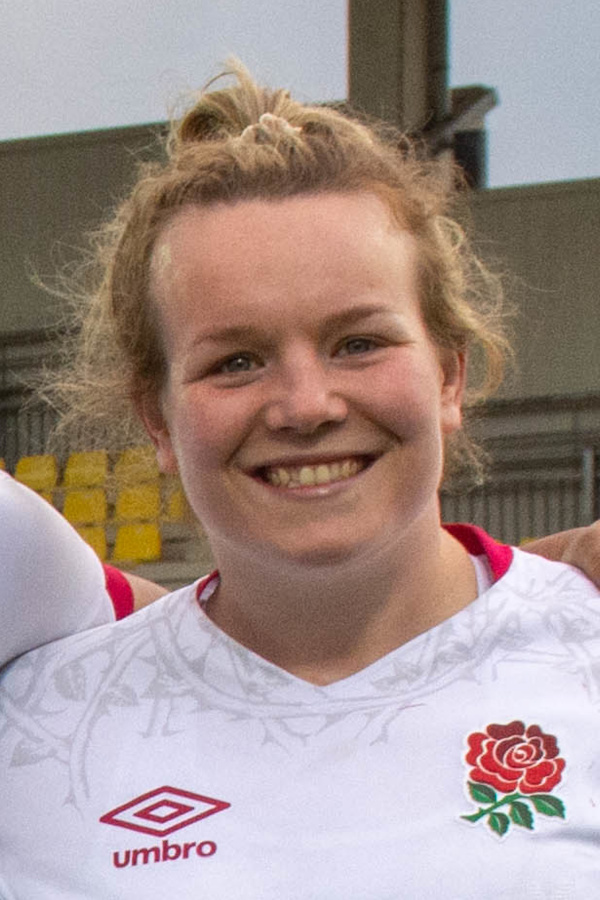
- Davies in 2022
- Born: Lark Bronwen Davies; 3 March 1995 (age 31) Ludlow, Shropshire, England
- Height: 1.64 m (5 ft 5 in)
- Weight: 85 kg (13 st 5 lb)

Rugby union career
- Position: Hooker
- Current team: Bristol Bears
Senior career
Years	Team	Apps	(Points)
2013–2020	Worcester Warriors		
2020–2022	Loughborough Lightning		
2022-	Bristol Bears		
International career
Years	Team	Apps	(Points)
2013–2015	England U20s		
2015–	England	74	(155)
Medal record
Representing England
Women's rugby union
Rugby World Cup
Gold medal – first place	2025 England	Team competition
Silver medal – second place	2021 New Zealand	Team competition

Lark Bronwen Atkin-Davies (born 3 March 1995) is an English rugby union player. She is a Six Nations Grand Slam champion as part of the England women's national rugby team, and plays for Bristol Bears at club level.

== International career ==
Davies made her international debut playing for England on 28 June 2015, playing against the US as part of the 2015 Super Series.

She was offered a full time contract by the RFU in January 2019, which was renewed for the 2019–20 season.

Before joining the senior team, Davies made eight appearances for the England women's rugby U20 side. Her first senior start came in the 2018 Women's Six Nations, when England played Italy.

She was a member of the England team for the 2018 Women's Six Nations. In 2019, she played in every game of the tournament helping England to win the grand slam; her second grand slam came in the 2020 Six Nations, in which she played three games.

In 2019 she played in the Super Series in San Diego, US. England came in second place.

She was named in the England squad for the delayed 2021 Rugby World Cup held in New Zealand in October and November 2022.

On 17 March 2025, she was called into the Red Roses side for the Six Nations Championship. She was named in England's squad for the Women's Rugby World Cup in England.

== Club career ==
Davies joined Worcester RFC as a hooker in 2013. She moved to the Worcester Valkyries (now the Worcester Warriors) in 2015 and was promoted to captain of the team in 2017.

She joined Loughborough Lightning in 2019, playing her first game for the club in September.

In 2022 Davies moved to Bristol Bears.

== Early life and education ==
Davies started playing rugby aged 10. She played at Orleton Primary School near Ludlow and went on to join Luctonians RFC, Greyhound RFC and Worcester RFC for age group rugby.

She attended Orleton Primary School and Wigmore School before completing her A Levels at Ludlow College. She then went on to study Primary Education at the University of Worcester.

A qualified primary school teacher, she previously taught at Kingsland Church of England Primary School and Carnforth Primary School before being offered her full time rugby contract in 2019.

== Honours ==
England

- Women's Rugby World Cup
  - (gold) Champion (1): 2025
