= Emma Sing =

England international rugby union player

- Born: 11 March 2001 (age 25) South Molton, Devon
- Height: 178 cm (5 ft 10 in)
- Weight: 73 kg (161 lb)

Rugby union career
- Position: Full-Back
- Current team: Gloucester-Hartpury
Senior career
Years	Team	Apps	(Points)
2018–	Gloucester-Hartpury		
International career
Years	Team	Apps	(Points)
2018	England U18s		
2019	England U20s		
2022–	England	13	(53)
- Correct as of 30 September 2025
Medal record
Representing England
Women's rugby union
Rugby World Cup
Gold medal – first place	2025 England	Team competition

Emma Elisbath J. Sing (born 11 March 2001) is an English rugby player who plays for the England women's national rugby union team and Gloucester-Hartpury at club level. She made her senior international debut for England in 2022.

== Club career ==
Sing began playing for Gloucester-Hartpury during the 2018–19 season. She was a member of the Gloucester-Hartpury team that won the 2022-23 Premier 15s, 2023–24 Premiership Women's Rugby and 2024–25 Premiership Women's Rugby titles.

== International career ==
Sing made her England debut against Scotland in March 2022. She scored her first international try against Italy during the 2022 Six Nations. Although involved in the wider training squad ahead of the delayed 2021 Rugby World Cup, she was not selected as part of the team that travelled to New Zealand.

Her first start for the national team was against Wales in April 2023, having been named as part of the squad for the 2023 Six Nations tournament.

Sing was called up to the England squad as an injury replacement for the 2023 WXV tournament by interim head coach Louis Deacon on 8 October 2023.

On 17 March 2025, she was called up into the Red Roses side for the Six Nations Championship.

In July 2025, England head coach John Mitchell named her in the side for the 2025 Women's Rugby World Cup. She was named in the squad to face Spain in a World Cup warm-up.

== Early life and education ==
Sing started playing rugby at the age of 6 and played for both South Molton and Crediton at U13 and U15s level before joining Hartpury College at the age of 16. She represented Devon U15s and U18s as a teenager. She grew up on a family farm in Devon.

As of 2023, she is studying Bioveterinary science at Hartpury University and intends to become a vet.

== Honours ==
Gloucester–Hartpury

- Premiership Women's Rugby
  - Champion (3) 2022–23, 2023–24, 2024–25

England

- Women's Rugby World Cup
  - (gold) Champion (1): 2025
