= Phoebe Murray =

English rugby union player

- Born: 1 March 1999 (age 27)
- University: Bristol University

Rugby union career
- Position: Centre
- Current team: Bristol Bears
Senior career
Years	Team	Apps	(Points)
2017-	Bristol Bears		
International career
Years	Team	Apps	(Points)
2024-	England	1	

Phoebe Murray (born 1 March 1999) is an English rugby union player who plays as a centre for Bristol Bears and the England women's national rugby union team.

== Early life ==
She began playing rugby union at Trojans RFC in Southampton, playing with boys until the age of 12 years-old when she moved to the girls' section at Ellingham and Ringwood RFC.

== Club career ==
She plays at centre for the Bristol Bears Women in Premiership Women's Rugby having joined the club in 2017. With Bristol, she reached the Premiership Women Rugby final in 2024, where they lost against eventual champions Gloucester-Hartpury.

== International career ==
She captained the England U20 side in 2018. She was named in the senior England women's national rugby union team squad for the 2024 WXV in Canada in September 2024. She made her debut for England in a 61–21 win over USA on 29 September 2024.

== Style of play ==
Ahead of her England debut, England captain Alex Matthews praised her ability to step up in attack and defence and described her as "strong and powerful".

== Personal life ==
She studied medicine at Bristol University where she captained the University Rugby Team and graduated in 2023. She then combined playing rugby union with working as a junior doctor at the Royal United Hospital in Bath.
