= Babalwa Latsha =

South African rugby union player

- Born: March 31, 1994 (age 32) Mount Frere, South Africa
- Height: 175 cm (5 ft 9 in)
- Weight: 95 kg (209 lb)

Rugby union career
- Position: Prop
Senior career
Years	Team	Apps	(Points)
2016–2019	Western Province		
2020	Eibar RT		
2021–2022	Western Province		
2023–2025	Harlequins	29	(45)
2026–	Western Province		
International career
Years	Team	Apps	(Points)
2018–	South Africa	40	(35)
- Correct as of 14 September 2025
National sevens team
Years	Team		Comps
- South Africa

Babalwa Latsha (born 31 March 1994, Mount Frere, South Africa) is a South African rugby union and sevens player.

She has been captain of South Africa since 2019. She is the first African women player to turn professional, joining Spanish club Eibar RT.

== Biography ==
Babalwa Latsha was born on 31 March 1994, in Mount Frere, South Africa, and grew up in the township of Khayelitsha near Cape Town. She describes herself as a "chubby and reserved" child. She only started playing rugby union at the age of 21 at the University of the Western Cape, where she was studying law. Her coaches spotted her talent and encouraged her to take rugby seriously because they believed she was capable of joining the provincial team, or even the national team.

She became a South African international in 2018 against Wales in Cardiff. (19–5) She was named in South Africa's squad to the Sevens World Cup in San Francisco.

In 2020, she turned professional by joining the Spanish club Eibar RT, where she scored thirteen tries in seven matches. The experience is unfortunately interrupted by the COVID-19 pandemic.

She is scheduled to compete in her first World Cup in New Zealand in September 2022.

In February 2023, she left to play in England for Harlequins. In October, she joined her national team to play in the first edition of WXV 2, the new competition created by World Rugby.

She was named in South Africa's squad to the 2025 Women's Rugby World Cup in England.

== Awards ==
=== Individual distinctions ===
- Western Province Player of the Year in 2016.
- South African Rugby Union Women’s Achiever of the Year in 2017.
- University of the Western Cape Athlete of the Year 2018.

== Engagements ==
Babalwa Latsha runs the Menstruation Foundation, an association that aims to make feminine hygiene products accessible to the poorest. She is also an ambassador for the Beast Foundation created by Springbok Tendai Mtawarira. She is also an ambassador for the philanthropic organization. She is also an ambassador for the philanthropic organization Laureus.
