= Alex Matthews =

England international rugby union player

Alexandra Matthews
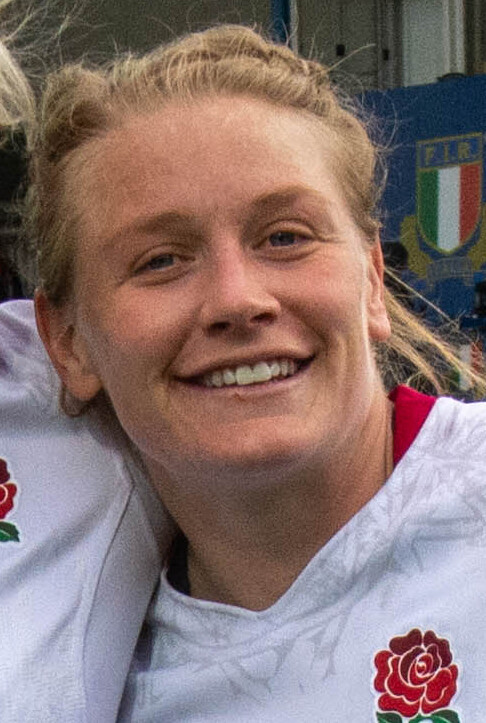
- Matthews in 2022
- Born: Alexandra George Matthews; 3 August 1993 (age 33) Camberley, Surrey, England
- Height: 1.73 m (5 ft 8 in)
- Weight: 180 lb (82 kg)

Rugby union career
- Position: Loose forward
International career
Years	Team	Apps	(Points)
2011–present	England	80	(110)
–	England U20	7	
National sevens team
Years	Team		Comps
- England 7s
Medal record
Representing England
Women's rugby sevens
Commonwealth Games
Bronze medal – third place	2018 Gold Coast	Team competition
Women's rugby union
Rugby World Cup
Gold medal – first place	2025 England	Team competition
Gold medal – first place	2014 France	Team competition
Silver medal – second place	2021 New Zealand	Team competition
Silver medal – second place	2017 Ireland	Team competition

Alexandra George Matthews (born 3 August 1993) is an English rugby union player. She made her debut for England in 2011 and was a member of the winning 2014 Women's Rugby World Cup and 2025 Women's Rugby World Cup squads. She currently plays for Gloucester–Hartpury Women's Rugby Football Club.

== International career ==
Matthews first played for England in 2011. In 2014, she was one of the youngest members of the England 2014 Women's Rugby World Cup squad, having played in the final versus Canada. Matthews had returned from a hip operation just two weeks pre-selection for the tournament to win a place on the team.

She played for the England 7s team, going semi-professional in 2013 and full-time in 2014 while completing her degree. In 2014, she was part of the training squad for the 2016 Olympic Games but was forced to leave three months before the Games due to illness and injury.

In 2017, she returned to England 15s as part of the 2017 Women's Rugby World Cup squad, playing in every game. England finished second in the tournament. Matthews was named Player of the Match for the side's game against the USA.

She switched back to 7s again in 2018 to take Bronze at the 2018 Commonwealth Games and is currently on a hybrid contract between England's senior team and the Great Britain women's rugby 7s team that was meant to play at the 2020 Olympics, postponed due to COVID-19.

Matthews was named RPA Women's Sevens Player of the Year in 2018.

She played for England in the 2020 Women's Six Nations Championship, which the side won. She was named in the England squad for the delayed 2021 Rugby World Cup held in New Zealand in October and November 2022.

She was called into the Red Roses side for the 2025 Six Nations Championship on 17 March. She was named in England's squad for the Women's Rugby World Cup.

== Club career ==
Matthews joined Worcester Warriors in 2020 after the funding for the Women's 7s GB team was cut earlier that year.

She previously played for Richmond alongside her older sister, Fran Matthews. In 2014, Matthews won the Premiership and Cup with Richmond.

== Early life and education ==
She started playing rugby aged three at Camberley RFC, where she played minis rugby until she had to stop playing with the boys' U12 team, although she continued to train with the boys' team for a further two years. Her sister Fran Matthews also plays both sevens and fifteens rugby for England.

Matthews attended Kings International College secondary school and Hartpury College before completing a degree in Sports Psychology at Roehampton University alongside her rugby commitments. She worked as a part-time carer between 2012 and 2015.

During the 2020 pandemic lockdown she spent time travelling the UK in her campervan.

== Honours ==
England

- Women's Rugby World Cup
  - (gold) Champion (2): 2014, 2025
