= Keira Bevan =

Wales international rugby union player

- Born: 28 April 1997 (age 29) Swansea, South Wales
- Height: 157 cm (5 ft 2 in)
- Weight: 56 kg (123 lb)

Rugby union career
- Position: Scrum half
- Current team: Bristol Bears
Senior career
Years	Team	Apps	(Points)
2013–present	Bristol Bears		(0)
International career
Years	Team	Apps	(Points)
2015–present	Wales	78	(146)
- Correct as of 24 September 2025

Keira Bevan (born 28 April 1997) is a Welsh rugby union player who plays scrum half for the Wales women's national rugby union team and Bristol Bears. She made her debut for Wales in 2015.

== Club career ==
Bevan played rugby on and off as child, eventually taking up the sport fully in January 2014. By the end of the year she had represented Wales in the Rugby Sevens at under-18 level against Sweden, and later at a senior level against Dubai, where Wales won the Women's Invitational event.

In June 2020 she signed a new deal with the Bristol Bears, having been with the side for seven seasons.

== International career ==
Bevan made her international debut for Wales playing against England during the 2015 Women's Six Nations Championship. After three appearances as a sub for Amy Day, she made her first start for Wales against Italy in the final round of the championship.

Bevan has since represented Wales in the 2016, 2017, 2018, 2019 and 2020 Women's Six Nations Championships, as well as the 2017 Women's Rugby World Cup. She made a particular impression during a test match against Ireland ahead of the 2020 Six Nations, when she scored a last-minute try to give Wales the victory.

Bevan had been due to represent Wales at the 2020 Olympic Games in Tokyo, which were subsequently postponed due to the COVID-19 pandemic.

She had been called up for the 2021 Women's Six Nations Championship, but was later ruled out of the tournament due to a leg injury sustained during training, only having recently returned from a long injury-driven spell on the sidelines. She was selected in Wales squad for the 2021 Rugby World Cup in New Zealand.

She was named in the Welsh side for the 2025 Six Nations Championship on 4 March 2025. On 11 August 2025, she was selected in the Welsh squad to the Women's Rugby World Cup in England.

== Personal life ==
Born in Swansea, Bevan attended Pontarddulais Comprehensive School.
