= May Campbell (rugby union) =

England international rugby union player

- Born: 16 May 1996 (age 30)
- Height: 158 cm (5 ft 2 in)
- Weight: 70 kg (154 lb)
- School: Keswick School and Hartpury College
- University: Brunel University

Rugby union career
- Position(s): Hooker, Back row
Senior career
Years	Team	Apps	(Points)
2017–	Saracens Women	141	(445)
- Correct as of 15 January 2025
International career
Years	Team	Apps	(Points)
2023-	England	5	(5)
Medal record
Representing England
Women's rugby union
Rugby World Cup
Gold medal – first place	2025 England	Team competition

May Alexandra Landale Campbell (born 16 May 1996) is a Scottish-born English rugby union player who currently plays as a hooker for Saracens Women and the England women's national team. Outside of rugby, Campbell works as a head of talent at a crypto payments company: Helio.

== Early life and education ==
Campbell grew up in Kilbryde Castle just outside Dunblane in Scotland and began playing rugby at Stirling County RFC. She moved to England to attend Keswick School, which had a good girls' rugby section, before progressing to Hartpury College for her A-Levels, and later studied sports science and business studies at Brunel University in London.

== Rugby career ==
=== Club career ===
Campbell joined Saracens Women in 2017. She made her 100th appearance for Saracens in 2023, becoming only the sixth woman to reach that milestone for the club. Most recently she reached 150 appearances for the club in January 2025. She has represented the Barbarians against South Africa and Munster Rugby Club.

=== International career ===
Campbell represented England at under-20 level. She made her senior debut for the England women's national team as a replacement against Wales in the 2023 Six Nations.

She was called up into the side again for the 2025 Six Nations campaign. She was subsequently named in England's squad for the Women's Rugby World Cup in England.

== Honours ==
England

- Women's Rugby World Cup
  - (gold) Champion (1): 2025
