= Bristol Bears Women =

English rugby union club, based in Bristol

- Full name: Bristol Bears Women
- Union: RFU
- Founded: 1984; 42 years ago
- Ground: Shaftesbury Park
- League: PWR
- 2025–26: 8th of 9

Official website
- www.bristolbearsrugby.com/match-centre/teams/bristol-bears-women/players/

Bristol Bears Women, formerly Clifton Ladies RFC, then Bristol Ladies, is a women's rugby union team based in Bristol, England. They are a standalone, independent rugby club, running in partnership with the Bristol Bears (formerly Bristol Rugby) since becoming affiliated to them in 2008 and play their home matches at Dings RFC in the Premiership Women's Rugby.

== History ==
Bristol Ladies were founded as Clifton Ladies RFC in 1984 for what was intended as a one-off match against Weston Hornets. They eventually made it into the Women's Premiership before being relegated. In 2002, they defeated Nottingham Medoc Casuals in the RFUW Rugby World National Cup Final at Franklin's Gardens in Northampton, Northamptonshire, which they won with thirteen international players in their side. They were the first club outside of the London clubs of Richmond Women, Saracens Women and Wasps Ladies to win the trophy. In 2007, they were promoted back into the Women's Premiership and played one more season as Clifton RFC. In 2008, Clifton became affiliated to Bristol Rugby, who then took over the running of the team from Clifton RFC. In 2012, they moved to Portway Rugby Development Centre from Dings Crusaders Rugby Football Club's ground that they were sharing with Dings Crusaders. This made them the first women's rugby club to own their own facilities.

== Current squad ==
The Bristol Bears squad for the 2025–26 season is:

Bristol Bears 2025–26 Premiership Women's Rugby squad
Hookers: (England) Lark Atkin-Davies; (Wales) Rosie Carr; (England) Heidi Pashaei-Tarighoun; (Canada) Holly Phillips; (Scotland) Lana Skeldon; (England) Jess Sprague; Props: (England) Nicola Beet; (England) Sarah Bern; (England) Hannah Botterman; (Scotland) Elliann Clarke; (Wales) Maisie Davies; (England) Aisha Jah; (Wales) Stella Orrin; (England) Simi Pam; (England) Izzy van der Straaten; Locks: (England) Christiana Balogun; (England) Delaney Burns; (Scotland) Hollie Cunningham; (England) Abbie Ward (c)	Back row: (Canada) Pamphinette Buisa; (Scotland) Evie Gallagher; (England) Jenny Herring; (Wales) Gwennan Hopkins; (Wales) Alisha Joyce-Butchers; (England) Rownita Marston-Mulhearn; (England) Demelza Short; Scrum-halves: (Wales) Keira Bevan; (Scotland) Rhea Clarke; (England) Tilly Ryall; Fly-halves: (Canada) Chloe Daniels; (England) Natalee Evans; (England) Millie Hyett; (Scotland) Meryl Smith	Centres: (England) Lauren Bailey; (England) Phoebe Murray; (Scotland) Emma Orr; (Wales) Savannah Picton-Powell; (Scotland) Meg Varley; (Wales) Jenna De Vera; Wings: (Wales) Jasmine Joyce-Butchers; (England) Josie Harris; (England) Reneeqa Bonner; (England) Millie David; Fullbacks: (England) Ella Lovibond; (Wales) Jenny Hesketh
(c) denotes the team captain. Only players listed on the official squad page are shown. Source:

== Notable players ==
At the 2017 Women's Rugby World Cup three Bristol Ladies players captained their national teams. Sarah Hunter, Carys Phillips and Claire Molloy captained England, Wales and Ireland respectively.

England internationals

- Pip Atkinson
- Sophie Hemming
- Karen Henderson
- Natasha Hunt
- Sarah Hunter
- Charlotte Male
- Harriet Millar-Mills
- Isabelle Noel-Smith
- Kimberley Oliver
- Marlie Packer
- Amber Reed
- Catherine Spencer
- Danielle Waterman
- Amy Wilson-Hardy
- Kay Wilson

Wales internationals

- Keira Bevan
- Liza Burgess
- Bethan Dainton
- Rebecca De Filippo
- Natalia John
- Manon Johnes
- Megan Jones
- Jasmine Joyce
- Courtney Keight
- Siwan Lillicrap
- Carys Phillips
- Gemma Rowland
- Elinor Snowsill
- Rachel Taylor

Great Britain sevens internationals

- Natasha Hunt
- Amy Wilson-Hardy

Ireland internationals

- Claire Molloy
- Larissa Muldoon
