= 2023–24 Premiership Women's Rugby =

Season in English women's rugby union

- Countries: England
- Number of teams: 9
- Date: 18 November 2023 – 22 June 2024
- Matches played: 74
- Highest attendance: 16,237 – Harlequins v Gloucester-Hartpury, 30 December 2023
- Tries scored: 630 (average 8.5 per match)
- Top point scorer: (England) Emma Sing (Gloucester-Hartpury) – 125 points
- Top try scorer: (England) Abby Dow (Trailfinders) – 12 tries

Official website
- www.thepwr.com

The 2023–24 Premiership Women's Rugby is the seventh season of Premiership Women's Rugby, the top-flight domestic women's rugby union club competition in England. Sponsored by Allianz for the fourth consecutive season, it is the first season under the rebranded banner of Premiership Women's Rugby, succeeding six seasons under Premier 15s branding.

== Teams and locations ==
In December 2022, the Rugby Football Union (RFU) and Women's Premier 15 Ltd (WP15) confirmed that eight clubs had been offered a place in the 2023–24 season. Four clubs from the 2022–23 season were omitted; DMP Sharks, Sale Sharks Women, University of Worcester Warriors, and Wasps Women. Two new clubs to the competition were named; Trailfinders Women and Leicester Tigers Women.

In February 2023, the RFU confirmed that both Sale Sharks Women and Worcester Warriors Women had been issued with a conditional offer to join the league for the 2023–24 season, bringing the total number of teams to ten.

All nine of the ten teams competing have support from either a professional men's Premiership or Championship side.

On 17 October 2023, the owners of Worcester Warriors Women, Cube International, notified the RFU and PWR that they intended to withdraw Worcester Warriors Women from Premiership Women's Rugby and the Allianz Cup. The regular season games involving Worcester would become bye weekends, and in the Allianz Cup, match results and player scores against Worcester were deleted from record. Before their withdrawal, Worcester were the only independent team in the competition.

Locations of the Premiership Women's Rugby teams
Premiership Women's Rugby clubs in London

Club	Head coach	Captain(s)	Stadium(s)	Capacity	Location
Bristol Bears Women	(England) Dave Ward	(England) Amber Reed (England) Abbie Ward	Shaftesbury Park	—	Bristol
Bristol Bears Women	(England) Dave Ward	(England) Amber Reed (England) Abbie Ward	Ashton Gate	27,000	Bristol
Exeter Chiefs Women	(England) Susie Appleby	(England) Poppy Leitch	Sandy Park	13,593	Exeter, Devon
Gloucester-Hartpury	(Wales) Sean Lynn	(England) Zoe Aldcroft (England) Natasha Hunt	Hartpury University Stadium	2,000	Hartpury, Gloucestershire
Gloucester-Hartpury	(Wales) Sean Lynn	(England) Zoe Aldcroft (England) Natasha Hunt	Kingsholm	16,115	Gloucester, Gloucestershire
Harlequins Women	(England) Amy Turner	(England) Rachael Burford	Twickenham Stoop (Note: Harlequins would also play one home game at Twickenham on 30 December 2023.)	14,800	Twickenham, Greater London
Leicester Tigers Women	(England) Vickey Macqueen	(England) Natasha Jones	Welford Road	25,849	Leicester, Leicestershire
Loughborough Lightning	(England) Nathan Smith	(Scotland) Rachel Malcolm	Franklin's Gardens	14,249	Northampton, Northamptonshire
Sale Sharks Women	(Wales) Rachel Taylor	(Ireland) Lauren Delany (United States) Georgie Perris-Redding	Heywood Road (Note: Sale Sharks would also play one home game at the Salford Community Stadium on 9 March 2024.)	3,387	Sale, Greater Manchester
Saracens Women	(England) Alex Austerberry	(United States) Lotte Clapp (England) Marlie Packer	StoneX Stadium	10,500	Hendon, Greater London
Trailfinders Women	(England) Giselle Mather	(Canada) Tyson Beukeboom	Trailfinders Sports Ground	4,000	West Ealing, London
Worcester Warriors Women (Note: Worcester Warriors withdrew from the league on 17 October 2023.)	(England) Joanne Yapp	—	Sixways Stadium	11,499	Worcester, Worcestershire

== Table ==
2023–24 Premiership Women's Rugby table
Pos	Team	Pld	W	D	L	PF	PA	PD	TF	TA	TB	LB	Pts	Qualification
1	Gloucester-Hartpury (C)	16	15	0	1	593	312	+281	93	50	15	1	76	Play-offs
2	Saracens Women (SF)	16	14	0	2	664	283	+381	106	44	14	0	70	Play-offs
3	Bristol Bears Women (RU)	16	11	0	5	517	280	+237	83	44	12	2	58	Play-offs
4	Exeter Chiefs Women (SF)	16	10	1	5	565	357	+208	89	56	13	2	57	Play-offs
5	Loughborough Lightning	16	7	0	9	375	478	−103	61	75	9	1	38	
6	Trailfinders Women	16	5	0	11	355	515	−160	53	81	6	3	29	
7	Harlequins Women	16	4	1	11	403	513	−110	54	77	8	3	29	
8	Sale Sharks Women (Note: Sale Sharks Women were deducted five points after failing to meet the competition's England-qualified player targets during Qualification Period 1.)	16	3	0	13	247	624	−377	39	100	4	2	13	
9	Leicester Tigers Women (Note: Leicester Tigers Women were deducted five points after failing to meet the competition's England-qualified player targets during Qualification Period 1.)	16	2	0	14	300	657	−357	47	103	6	1	10	

Updated to match(es) played on 2 June 2024. Source:
Rules for classification: Tiebreakers for teams tied on points: 1) Number of matches won; 2) Difference between points for and against; 3) Total number of points for; 4) Aggregate number of points scored in matches between tied teams; 5) Number of matches won excluding the first match, then the second and so on until the tie is settled.
(C) Champions; (RU) Runners-up; (SF) Losing semi-finalists

=== Round-by-round progression ===
The grid below shows each team's progression throughout the season, indicating their points total (and league table position) at the end of every round:

Team Progression
Team	R1	R2	R3	R4	R5	R6	R7	R8	R9	R10	R11	R12	R13	R14	R15	R16	R17	R18
Gloucester-Hartpury	0 (7th)	5 (4th)	9 (3rd)	9 (Note: The fixture between Gloucester-Hartpury and Sale Sharks was postponed from its original date of 9 December 2023, due to absent medical support.) (4th)	14 (4th)	19 (3rd)	24 (3rd)	29 (2nd)	34 (2nd)	39 (2nd)	49 (1st)	54 (1st)	59 (1st)	64 (1st)	69 (1st)	74 (1st)	76 (1st)	76 (1st)
Saracens	5 (2nd)	10 (1st)	15 (1st)	15 (1st)	20 (1st)	25 (1st)	30 (1st)	35 (1st)	35 (1st)	40 (1st)	45 (2nd)	45 (2nd)	50 (2nd)	50 (2nd)	55 (2nd)	60 (2nd)	65 (2nd)	70 (2nd)
Bristol Bears	5 (1st)	5 (5th)	5 (5th)	10 (3rd)	15 (3rd)	15 (3rd)	15 (4th)	20 (4th)	25 (4th)	30 (4th)	31 (4th)	36 (4th)	41 (4th)	46 (4th)	46 (4th)	51 (4th)	56 (3rd)	58 (3rd)
Exeter Chiefs	5 (3rd)	10 (2nd)	10 (Note: The fixture between Sale Sharks and Exeter Chiefs was postponed from its original date of 2 December 2023, due to a frozen pitch.) (2nd)	15 (2nd)	17 (2nd)	22 (2nd)	27 (2nd)	28 (3rd)	33 (3rd)	33 (3rd)	38 (3rd)	40 (3rd)	42 (3rd)	47 (3rd)	52 (3rd)	52 (3rd)	52 (4th)	57 (4th)
Loughborough Lightning	0 (8th)	0 (9th)	5 (6th)	5 (8th)	10 (5th)	10 (6th)	11 (7th)	16 (5th)	21 (5th)	21 (5th)	22 (5th)	22 (5th)	27 (5th)	27 (5th)	28 (5th)	33 (5th)	37 (5th)	38 (5th)
Trailfinders	1 (5th)	1 (7th)	1 (8th)	6 (5th)	6 (6th)	11 (5th)	11 (5th)	13 (6th)	13 (7th)	13 (7th)	13 (7th)	18 (7th)	18 (7th)	23 (6th)	23 (7th)	23 (7th)	24 (7th)	29 (6th)
Harlequins	4 (4th)	6 (3rd)	6 (4th)	6 (6th)	6 (7th)	6 (6th)	11 (6th)	13 (7th)	13 (6th)	18 (6th)	20 (6th)	22 (6th)	22 (6th)	23 (7th)	28 (6th)	28 (6th)	28 (6th)	29 (7th)
Sale Sharks	0 (9th)	5 (6th)	5 (7th)	5 (7th)	5 (8th)	7 (7th)	7 (8th)	7 (8th)	8 (8th)	8 (9th)	3 (Note: Leicester Tigers and Sale Sharks were deducted 5 points each after round 10.) (9th)	3 (9th)	3 (9th)	3 (9th)	3 (9th)	3 (9th)	8 (9th)	13 (8th)
Leicester Tigers	1 (6th)	1 (8th)	1 (9th)	1 (9th)	1 (9th)	1 (9th)	2 (9th)	2 (9th)	7 (9th)	9 (8th)	7 (9th)	8 (8th)	8 (8th)	8 (8th)	8 (8th)	9 (8th)	9 (8th)	10 (9th)
Updated: 2 June 2024

Key
Win	Draw	Loss	Bye

== Regular season ==
The regular season fixtures are due to play out over the course of 18 rounds, with each round consisting of five matches. The fixtures were announced on 9 August 2023. Following the withdrawal of Worcester, fixtures previously involving them would become bye weekends.

Highlights of the season include:

- SuperPWR Weekend–All four Round 13 fixtures, on the weekend of 1–3 March 2024, were held at main stadiums and broadcast on either TNT Sports or YouTube and TikTok.
- Women's Slater Cup–Leicester Tigers and Gloucester-Hartpury contested the Slater Cup at Kingsholm on 25 November 2023, and at Welford Road on 3 February 2023, in honour of former Leicester and Gloucester men's player Ed Slater.
- Big Game 15–Harlequins hosted Gloucester-Hartpury in the season's edition of The Big Game at Twickenham Stadium on 30 December 2023.

=== Results ===
Home \ Away	BRI	EXE	GLO	HAR	LEI	LOU	SAL	SAR	TRA
Bristol Bears	—	22–12	0–12	26–7	62–24	33–17	48–5	35–10	41–17
Exeter Chiefs	29–14	—	27–31	19–19	59–27	43–7	64–5	7–57	38–19
Gloucester-Hartpury	24–19	31–24	—	57–24	52–14	42–24	29–3	24–15	59–12
Harlequins	25–47	27–52	19–31	—	47–12	26–29	53–12	0–31	27–54
Leicester Tigers	12–50	27–44	26–33	24–33	—	12–24	21–36	17–60	14–29
Loughborough Lightning	17–46	19–27	26–61	38–19	17–22	—	38–15	24–33	45–21
Sale Sharks	27–24	3–54	19–43	35–31	19–22	12–24	—	3–69	10–26
Saracens	32–10	39–26	33–31	29–24	54–19	48–7	54–21	—	48–17
Trailfinders	10–38	10–40	27–33	17–22	36–7	18–19	24–22	18–52	—

Updated to match(es) played on 2 June 2024. Source: RFU
Legend: Blue = home team win; Yellow = draw; Red = away team win.

=== Round 1 ===
18 November 2023
12:30

(1 BP) Bristol Bears Women	48–5	Sale Sharks Women
Try: Atkin-Davies (2) 3' m, 61' c Bonner 8' c Ward 13' c Burgess 33' c Murray 49' m Sprague 64' m Lovibond 69' m Con: Aitchison (3/5) 9', 14', 34'; Reed (1/3) 62'	Report	Try: Rigoni 37' m

Ashton Gate
Referee: Alex Thomas

18 November 2023
14:30

(1 BP) Saracens Women	48–7	Loughborough Lightning
Try: de Goede (2) 4' m, 21' m Infante 27' c Penalty try 53'; P. Cleall 57' c Breach 63' c Packer 74' m Gregson 79' m Con: de Goede (1/3) 28'; Harrison (2/4) 57', 63'	Report	Try: Malcolm 12' c Con: Rowland (1/1) 13'

StoneX Stadium
Referee: Andy Wigley

18 November 2023
15:00

(1 BP) Trailfinders Women	17–22	Harlequins Women
Try: Musgrove 39' c Amory 54' c Con: Green (2/2) 40', 54'; Pen: Green (1/1) 8'	Report	Try: Mayhew 16' m F. Robinson 21' c Fleming 61' c Con: Tuima (2/3) 22', 62'; Pen: Tuima (1/2) 71'

Trailfinders Sports Ground
Referee: Neil Chivers

19 November 2023
15:00

(1 BP) Leicester Tigers Women	27–44	Exeter Chiefs Women (1 BP)
Try: M. Jones 36' c Collie 41' m McGhie 56' m Donaldson 69' c Con: M. Jones (2/4) 37', 70'; Pen: M. Jones (1/1) 29'	Report	Try: Doidge 12' m Orchard (2) 18' m, 48' m Moloney (2) 34' m, 58' c Cantorna 66' m MacDonald 70' m Buchanan 79' c Con: Cantorna (2/8) 59', 80'

Welford Road
Referee: Holly Wood

Bye/s: Gloucester-Hartpury

=== Round 2 ===
25 November 2023
16:45

Trailfinders Women	18–52	Saracens Women (1 BP)
Try: Dow (2) 51' m, 64' c Con: Green (1/2) 65'; Pen: Green (2/2) 10', 14'	Report	Try: Wyrwas 4' c Campbell 12' c Harrison 22' m Packer 27' c Bridger 45' c Breach 47' c Gregson 61' m de Goede 78' c Con: Harrison (5/7) 5', 13', 28', 46', 48' de Goede (1/1) 79'

Trailfinders Sports Ground
Referee: Dan Jones

25 November 2023
17:30

(1 BP) Gloucester-Hartpury	52–14	Leicester Tigers Women
Try: Brock 4' c Taylor 10' c Perry 16' c Beckett 20' c Venner (2) 26' c, 59' m Sing 40' m N. Jones 47' c Con: Sing (6/8) 5', 11', 17', 21', 27', 48'	Report	Try: Feury 71' c M. Jones 74' c Con: M. Jones (2/2) 72', 75'

Kingsholm
Referee: Alex Thomas

25 November 2023
19:00

(1 BP) Sale Sharks Women	35–31	Harlequins Women (2 BP)
Try: V.A. Irwin 5' c Talling (2) 23' c, 50' c Rigoni 36' c Swailes 46' c Con: V.A. Irwin (5/5) 6', 24', 37', 47', 51'	Report	Try: Konkel-Roberts 10' m Fleming 27' m Hele 41' c Mayhew 54' c Latsha 58' c Con: Tuima (3/5) 43', 55', 59'

Heywood Road
Referee: Andy Wigley

26 November 2023
12:30

(1 BP) Exeter Chiefs Women	29–14	Bristol Bears Women
Try: Tuttosi 19' c Johnson (2) 34' c, 42' c MacDonald 78' m Con: Cantorna (3/4) 20', 34', 43'; Pen: Cantorna (1/1) 55'	Report	Try: Nigrelli 5' c Bern 69' c Con: Aitchison (2/2) 6', 70'

Sandy Park
Referee: Anthony Woodthorpe

Bye/s: Loughborough Lightning

=== Round 3 ===
1 December 2023
19:30

Bristol Bears Women	0–12	Gloucester-Hartpury
	Report	Try: Beckett 5' c Sing 55' m Con: Sing (1/2) 6'

Shaftesbury Park
Referee: Alex Thomas

2 December 2023
15:00

Harlequins Women	0–31	Saracens Women (1 BP)
	Report	Try: Campbell 24' c Packer 36' m Farries (2) 58' c, 76' m Penalty try 63'; Con: de Goede (2/4) 25', 59'

Twickenham Stoop
Referee: Mike Hudson

3 December 2023
17:30

Leicester Tigers Women	12–24	Loughborough Lightning (1 BP)
Try: Brody 48' m Relf 66' c Con: M. Jones (1/2) 66'	Report	Try: Westcombe-Evans (2) 2' m, 71' m Meuller (2) 16' c, 21' c Con: Nelson (2/4) 17', 22'

Welford Road
Referee: Andy Wigley

28 January 2024
13:00

Sale Sharks Women	3–54	Exeter Chiefs Women (1 BP)
Pen: Yamamoto (1/1) 8'	Report	Try: Tuttosi 5' c Buchanan (2) 17' c, 55' m Jefferies 25' c Millar-Mills 45' c Rogers 59' c Bricknell (2) 70' c, 80' c Con: Cramer (7/8) 6', 18', 26', 46', 61', 71', 80+1'

Heywood Road
Referee: Nikki O'Donnell

- Game rescheduled from 2 December 2023 due to a frozen pitch.

Bye/s: Trailfinders Women

=== Round 4 ===
9 December 2023
14:00

Loughborough Lightning	17–46	Bristol Bears Women (1 BP)
Try: Morrall 11' c Treder 51' m Williams-Morris 76' m Con: Rowland (1/1) 11'	Report	Try: Wills 1' m Varley (2) 6' m, 24' c Bern 38' m Bevan 47' m A. Joyce-Butchers 59' m Nigrelli 71' c Atkin-Davies 80' c Con: Aitchison (1/5) 25'; Reed (2/3) 72', 80'

Franklin's Gardens
Referee: Craig Maxwell-Keys

9 December 2023
15:00

Harlequins Women	27–52	Exeter Chiefs Women (1 BP)
Try: F. Robinson 41' c Sims 66' c Cromack 73' c Con: Tuima (3/3) 42', 67', 73'; Pen: Tuima (2/2) 15', 27'	Report	Try: Tuttosi (2) 12', 39' c c Doidge (3) 22' c, 53' m, 60' m Middlebrooke 29' c Tessier 49' m MacDonald 56' c Con: Cantorna (6/8) 13', 23', 30', 40', 55', 57'

Twickenham Stoop
Referee: Harry Walbaum

9 December 2023
15:00

(1 BP) Trailfinders Women	36–7	Leicester Tigers Women
Try: Crake (2) 3' c, 30' m Laflin 9' m Barwick 36' c Dow 56' m Zackary 79' c Con: Green (3/6) 4', 36', 80'	Report	Try: Martin 15' c Con: M. Jones (1/1) 16'

Trailfinders Sports Ground
Referee: Mike Hudson

17 February 2024
13:00

(1 BP) Gloucester-Hartpury	29–3	Sale Sharks Women
Try: Beckett 25' m Buggy 35' m Else 55' c Matthews 61' c K. Jones 77' m Con: George (2/4) 56', 78'	Report	Pen: Rigoni (1/1) 6'

Hartpury University Stadium
Referee: Jonathan Cook

- Game rescheduled from 9 December 2023 due to absent medical cover.

Bye/s: Saracens Women

=== Round 5 ===
16 December 2023
13:00

(1 BP) Bristol Bears Women	41–17	Trailfinders Women
Try: Skeldon (3) 2' c, 25' m, 59' c Botterman 54' c Murray 63' m Varley 68' m Smith 80' m Con: Aitchison (1/2) 3'; Smith (2/5) 55', 60'	Report	Try: Inman 29' m Pen: Green (4/5) 11', 16', 43', 49'

Shaftesbury Park
Referee: Harry Walbaum

16 December 2023
15:00

(2 BP) Exeter Chiefs Women	27–31	Gloucester-Hartpury (1 BP)
Try: Menin 39' c MacDonald (2) 46' c, 51' m Tuttosi 59' m Con: Cantorna (2/4) 40', 47'; Pen: Cantorna (1/1) 72'	Report	Try: K. Jones 2' m Matthews (2) 13' c, 64' c Monaghan 31'; Venner 73'; Con: Sing (2/3) 14', 32'; George (1/2) 65'

Sandy Park
Referee: Hamish Grant

16 December 2023
15:00

Leicester Tigers Women	17–60	Saracens Women (1 BP)
Try: McGhie 3' c Richardson 17' m Feury 72' m Con: M. Jones (1/3) 4'	Report	Try: Kasolo 6' m Packer 25' m Gregson (2) 30' c, 52' c Clifford 35' m Clapp (2) 44' m, 57' m Breach 47' c Farries 77' c de Goede 67' c Con: de Goede (5/10) 31', 48', 52', 68', 78'

Welford Road
Referee: Richard Gordon

16 December 2023
15:00

Sale Sharks Women	12–24	Loughborough Lightning (1 BP)
Try: Talling 48' c Prothero 66' m Con: V.A. Irwin (1/2) 49'	Report	Try: Hibbert-Jones 10' c Morrall (2) 25' m, 35' m O'Donnell 55' c Con: Nelson (2/4) 11', 55'

Heywood Road
Referee: Andrew Jackson

Bye/s: Harlequins Women

=== Round 6 ===
22 December 2023
18:30

(1 BP) Trailfinders Women	24–22	Sale Sharks Women (2 BP)
Try: Zackary 6' m Penalty try 11'; Dow 35' m Schell 73' c Con: Green (1/3) 73'	Report	Try: G. Perris-Redding 20' c Harper 39' m Swailes (2) 50' m, 78' m Con: V.A. Irwin (1/4) 21'

Trailfinders Sports Ground
Referee: Andy Wigley

23 December 2023
12:30

(1 BP) Saracens Women	32–10	Bristol Bears Women
Try: Breach 4' m Packer (2) 55' m, 74' m de Goede 58' m Campbell 69' m Grant 80' c Con: de Goede (1/6) 80+1'	Report	Try: Atkin-Davies 8' m Murray 14' m

StoneX Stadium
Referee: Sara Cox

23 December 2023
14:30

Loughborough Lightning	19–27	Exeter Chiefs Women (1 BP)
Try: Wassell 36' c Treder 62'; Penalty try 75'; Con: Rowland (1/2) 37'	Report	Try: Allen 12' m Tessier 26' c Sinclair (2) 42' m, 79' m Menin 71' m Con: Cantorna (1/3) 27'

Franklin's Gardens
Referee: Richard Gordon

30 December 2023
14:30

Harlequins Women	19–31	Gloucester-Hartpury (1 BP)
Try: Sims 33' c Scott 42' m Latsha 56' c Con: Tuima (2/3) 34', 57'	Report	Try: H. Jones 3' c Monaghan 13' c Venner 22' m Tuipulotu 27' c Lund 80' m Con: Sing (3/5) 4', 14', 28'

Twickenham
Attendance: 16,237
Referee: George Selwood

Bye/s: Leicester Tigers Women

=== Round 7 ===
6 January 2024
14:00

(1 BP) Gloucester-Hartpury	42–24	Loughborough Lightning (1 BP)
Try: Sing 11' c K. Jones 16' c H. Jones (2) 28' c, 71' c Monaghan 39' c Brock 42' c Con: Sing (6/6) 11', 17', 29', 40', 43', 72'	Report	Try: O'Donnell (2) 4' c, 34' c Treder 67' m Westcombe-Evans 77' m Con: Rowland (2/4) 5', 35'

Hartpury University Stadium
Referee: Richard Gordon

6 January 2024
14:00

Sale Sharks Women	3–69	Saracens Women (1 BP)
Pen: V.A. Irwin (1/1) 18'	Report	Try: Gondwe 14' c Farries (3) 19' c, 61' m, 67' c Packer (2) 30' c, 40' c P. Cleall 41' c Breach 44' m Infante 46' c Hunt 64' m de Goede 74' m Con: de Goede (7/11) 15', 19', 31', 40', 42', 47', 68'

Heywood Road
Referee: Holly Wood

6 January 2024
18:00

(1 BP) Leicester Tigers Women	24–33	Harlequins Women (1 BP)
Try: M. Jones 35' c Martin 46' m Brody 54' m McGhie 60' c Con: M. Jones (2/4) 36', 61'	Report	Try: F. Robinson 10' c Leaney (2) 25' m, 78' c Kildunne 39' c B. Cleall 49' c Con: Tuima (3/4) 11', 40', 50'; Cromack (1/1) 79'

Welford Road
Referee: Alex Thomas

7 January 2024
12:30

(1 BP) Exeter Chiefs Women	38–19	Trailfinders Women
Try: Rogers 2' m MacDonald 11' m Preece 18' c Cantorna 34' c Moloney 45' c Bricknell 56' c Con: Cantorna (4/6) 19', 35', 46', 57'	Report	Try: Dow 39' c Cox 71' c Zackary 76' m Con: Green (2/3) 40', 72'

Sandy Park
Referee: Hamish Grant

Bye/s: Bristol Bears Women

=== Round 8 ===
13 January 2024
13:00

Leicester Tigers Women	12–50	Bristol Bears Women (1 BP)
Try: Martin 38' m Brody 48' c Con: Gallagher (1/1) 49'	Report	Try: Wills 17' c Varley 22' m Smith 27' c Burns 40' c Aitchison 61' m Penalty try 65'; Smale 67' c Ward 77' m Con: Reed (4/7) 18', 28', 40', 68'

Welford Road
Referee: Andy Wigley

13 January 2024
14:00

(2 BP) Harlequins Women	26–29	Loughborough Lightning (1 BP)
Try: Brown (2) 2' c, 19' c Tuima 15' m Hele 73' c Con: Tuima (3/4) 3', 20', 74'	Report	Try: Tasker 25' c Treder (2) 40' m, 77' c Westcombe-Evans 52' m Taufo'ou 55' m Con: Rowland (2/5) 26', 79'

Twickenham Stoop
Referee: Hamish Grant

13 January 2024
14:30

(1 BP) Saracens Women	39–26	Exeter Chiefs Women (1 BP)
Try: Wyrwas 9' c Campbell 16' m de Goede 31' m Farries 47' m Breach 58' m Packer 69' m Infante 76' c Con: de Goede (2/7) 10', 77'	Report	Try: Rogers 21' c Moloney 28' c MacDonald 41' c Kobayashi 80' m Con: Cantorna (3/4) 22', 28', 42'

StoneX Stadium
Referee: Richard Gordon

13 January 2024
16:45

(2 BP) Trailfinders Women	27–33	Gloucester-Hartpury (1 BP)
Try: Crake (2) 10' m, 28' m Amory 51' m Laflin 64' m Schell 79' c Con: Green (1/1) 80'	Report	Try: Lund 4' m George 21' c N. Jones 34' c Beckett 40' c Hunt 69' c Con: George (4/5) 22', 35', 40', 69'

Trailfinders Sports Ground
Referee: Nikki O'Donnell

Bye/s: Sale Sharks Women

=== Round 9 ===
20 January 2024
13:00

(1 BP) Bristol Bears Women	26–7	Harlequins Women
Try: Wills 12' c Reed 24' m Burns 52' c Botterman 75' c Con: Reed (3/4) 12', 52', 75'	Report	Try: Sims 61' c Con: Tuima (1/1) 61'

Shaftesbury Park
Referee: Nikki O'Donnell

20 January 2024
14:00

(1 BP) Gloucester-Hartpury	24–15	Saracens Women
Try: K. Jones (3) 3'm, 39' m, 44' c Sing 63' c Con: Sing (2/4) 45', 64'	Report	Try: Campbell 17' m Field 57' m Grant 80' m

Kingsholm
Referee: Harry Walbaum

20 January 2024
14:00

(1 BP) Loughborough Lightning	45–21	Trailfinders Women
Try: Nelson 8' c Kabeya (2) 12' m, 18' c O'Donnell 31' c Mataitoga 34' c Rowland 67' c Rollie 80' m Con: Rowland (5/7) 9', 18', 31', 34', 67'	Report	Try: Cox 15' c Laflin 40' c Seye 43' c Con: Green (3/3) 15', 40', 43'

Loughborough University
Referee: Holly Wood

21 January 2024
16:00

(1 BP) Sale Sharks Women	19–22	Leicester Tigers Women (1 BP)
Try: Kelly 21' c Bawden 40' m Benson 51' c Con: V.A Irwin (2/3) 22', 52'	Report	Try: Gallagher 12' c Feury 43' m M. Jones 64' m Bartlett 77' m Con: M. Jones (1/4) 13'

Hare Lane
Referee: Neil Chivers

Bye/s: Exeter Chiefs Women

=== Round 10 ===
3 February 2024
12:30

(2 BP) Leicester Tigers Women	26–33	Gloucester-Hartpury (1 BP)
Try: McBrien 11' c M. Jones 18' c McGhie 40' m Tutt 42' c Con: M. Jones (3/4) 12', 19', 43'	Report	Try: Lake 31' c Matthews 48' c Richards (2) 58' m, 63' c Sing 75' c Con: George (4/5) 32', 49', 64', 76'

Welford Road
Referee: Holly Wood

3 February 2024
13:00

(1 BP) Bristol Bears Women	22–12	Exeter Chiefs Women
Try: Atkin-Davies 35' m Wills (2) 48' m, 52' m Varley 67' c Con: Aitchison (1/4) 68'	Report	Try: Johnson 3' m Doidge 30' c Con: Cantorna (1/2) 31'

Shaftesbury Park
Referee: Dan Jones

3 February 2024
14:30

(1 BP) Saracens Women	48–17	Trailfinders Women
Try: Gregson (2) 3' c, 63' m Hunt 11' m Infante 13' m P. Cleall 27' m de Goede 49' c Packer (2) 56' c, 73' c Con: de Goede (4/8) 4', 50', 57', 74	Report	Try: Barwick 19' m Dow 22' c Inman 69' m Con: Schell (1/3) 23'

StoneX Stadium
Referee: Jonathan Cook

4 February 2024
15:00

(1 BP) Harlequins Women	53–12	Sale Sharks Women
Try: Kildunne (4) 14' m, 17' c, 25' c, 79' c Wilcock (3) 31' m, 45' m, 65' c Mayhew 42' m Powell 55' m Con: Tuima (2/6) 18', 26'; Cromack (2/3) 66', 80'	Report	Try: Haungatau 10' m Greave 59' c Con: V.A. Irwin (1/2) 60'

Twickenham Stoop
Referee: Harry Walbaum

Bye/s: Loughborough Lightning

=== Round 11 ===
10 February 2024
12:30

(1 BP) Saracens Women	29–24	Harlequins Women (2 BP)
Try: Penalty try 36'; Hunt (3) 39' m, 42' c, 56' c Con: Blacklock (1/2) 43'; Harrison (1/1) 57'; Pen: Harrison (1/1) 80'	Report	Try: Brown 11' c Aucken 62' m Wythe 71' c Layzell 77' m Con: Tuima (1/1) 12'; Cromack (1/3) 72'

StoneX Stadium
Attendance: 3,071
Referee: Sara Cox

10 February 2024
14:00

(1 BP) Loughborough Lightning	17–22	Leicester Tigers Women
Try: Treder (3) 2' c, 16' m, 37' m Con: Rowland (1/3) 3'	Report	Try: Gallagher (2) 6' m, 74' c Tutt 40' c Con: M. Jones (2/3) 40+1', 75'; Pen: M. Jones (1/1) 78'

Franklin's Gardens
Attendance: 1,703
Referee: Craig Maxwell-Keys

11 February 2024
13:00

(1 BP) Exeter Chiefs Women	64–5	Sale Sharks Women
Try: MacDonald (2) 15' c, 39' c Sinclair (3) 32' c, 54' c, 74' m Moloney 46' c Menin 61' c Millar-Mills 65' m Wilkins 79' m Con: Cantorna (6/9) 16', 33', 40', 47', 55', 62'	Report	Try: Delany 28' m

Sandy Park
Referee: Hamish Grant

11 February 2024
14:00

(1 BP) Gloucester-Hartpury	24–19	Bristol Bears Women (1 BP)
Try: Hunt 6' c Hyett 48' m N. Jones 61' c Metcalfe 79' m Con: Sing (2/4) 7', 62'	Report	Try: Aitchison 21' c Skeldon (2) 38' c, 43' m Con: Reed (2/3) 22', 40'

Kingsholm
Referee: Adam Leal

Bye/s: Trailfinders Women

=== Round 12 ===
23 February 2024
19:00

Leicester Tigers Women	14–29	Trailfinders Women (1 BP)
Try: McGhie 32' c Brody 41' c Con: M. Jones (2/2) 33', 42'	Report	Try: Crake (2) 14' c, 36' c Schell 19' c Dow 29' m Con: Schell (3/4) 15', 20' 37'; Pen: Schell (1/1) 61'

Welford Road
Referee: Harry Walbaum

23 February 2024
19:45

(1 BP) Bristol Bears Women	33–17	Loughborough Lightning
Try: Pam 15' c Skeldon (2) 30' m, 45' c Ward 34' c Gallagher 62' c Con: Reed (4/5) 16', 35', 46', 63'	Report	Try: Taufo'ou 26' c Kabeya 40' m Rowland 75' m Con: Rowland (1/3) 27'

Ashton Gate
Referee: Mike Hudson

24 February 2024
14:30

Exeter Chiefs Women	19–19	Harlequins Women
Try: Menin 19' c MacDonald 28' c Buchanan 64' m Con: Cantorna (2/3) 20', 29'	Report	Try: Powell 16' m Latsha 34' c Cowell 47' c Con: Cromack (2/3) 35', 48'

Sandy Park
Referee: Charles Gayther

25 February 2024
14:00

Sale Sharks Women	19–43	Gloucester-Hartpury (1 BP)
Try: G. Perris-Redding 14' c Haungatau 53' c Bawden 67' m Con: V.A. Irwin (2/3) 15', 54'	Report	Try: Hendy 1' m K. Jones 19' m Muir 25' c Beckett 33' m McCarthy 39' c Crabb 44' c N. Jones 64' c Con: George (3/6) 26', 40', 45'; Manns (1/1) 65'

Heywood Road
Referee: Andy Wigley

Bye/s: Saracens Women

=== Round 13 ===
2 March 2024
15:05

(1 BP) Gloucester-Hartpury	31–24	Exeter Chiefs Women (2 BP)
Try: Sing 6' m Hendy 12' m Brock (2) 35' c, 63' c Hunt 50' c Con: Sing (3/5) 36', 51', 64'	Report	Try: Tuttosi (2) 21' c, 43' c Rogers 25' m Sinclair 78' m Con: Cantorna (2/4) 22', 44'

Kingsholm
Referee: Tom Foley

2 March 2024
17:00

Trailfinders Women	10–38	Bristol Bears Women (1 BP)
Try: Blanco 11' m Laflin 36' m	Report	Try: Pyrs (2) 18' c, 40' c Atkin-Davies (2) 26' m, 47' m Skeldon (2) 75' c, 79' c Con: Reed (3/5) 19', 40+1', 80'; Smith (1/1) 76'

Trailfinders Sports Ground
Referee: Jonathan Cook

3 March 2024
13:00

(1 BP) Saracens Women	54–19	Leicester Tigers Women
Try: Harrison 6' c Campbell 37' c Infante 48' c Clapp 66' m Field 71' c Breach 74' c Farries 78' c P. Cleall 80' c Con: Harrison (7/8) 7', 38', 49', 72', 75', 79', 80+1'	Report	Try: McBrien 10' c Brody 42' m Bartlett 59' c Con: M. Jones (2/3) 11', 60'

StoneX Stadium
Referee: Nikki O'Donnell

3 March 2024
15:00

(1 BP) Loughborough Lightning	38–15	Sale Sharks Women
Try: Hibbert-Jones 3' c Malcolm 18' c Treder 30' c Kabeya 43' m Campion 61' c Williams-Morris 78' m Con: Rowland (4/6) 4', 19', 31', 62'	Report	Try: G. Perris-Redding 23' m Swailes 63' m Benson 75' m

Franklin's Gardens
Referee: Holly Wood

Bye/s: Harlequins Women

=== Round 14 ===
8 March 2024
19:45

(1 BP) Gloucester-Hartpury	57–24	Harlequins Women (1 BP)
Try: Beckett (2) 19' c, 38' c Muir 23' c Metcalfe (3) 46' m, 53' c, 78' c Hendy 50' c N. Jones (2) 66' m, 71' m Con: Sing (5/7) 20', 24', 39', 51', 54'; Goulden (1/2) 79'	Report	Try: Brown 11' c Cowell 28' m Powell (2) 62' m, 74' c Con: Tuima (1/3) 12'; Cromack (1/1) 75'

Kingsholm
Referee: Sara Cox

9 March 2024
14:00

Sale Sharks Women	10–26	Trailfinders Women (1 BP)
Try: James 69' m Swailes 79' m	Report	Try: Zackary (2) 1' c, 73' c Inman 15' m Swords 36' c Con: Green (3/4) 2', 37', 74'

Salford Community Stadium
Referee: Mike Hudson

9 March 2024
14:00

(1 BP) Exeter Chiefs Women	43–7	Loughborough Lightning
Try: Menin 12' c Kobayashi (3) 21' m, 49' m, 78' m Rogers 29' c Fryday 60' c Moloney 68' c Cantorna 79' m Con: Cantorna (4/8) 13', 30', 62', 69'	Report	Try: Malcolm 16' c Con: Rowland (1/1) 17'

Sandy Park
Referee: Richard Gordon

10 March 2024
15:00

(1 BP) Bristol Bears Women	35–10	Saracens Women
Try: Murray (2) 3' c, 56' c Bonner (2) 6' c, 80' c Atkin-Davies 41' c Con: Reed (5/5) 3', 6', 42', 57', 80'	Report	Try: G. Evans 17' c Con: Harrison (1/1) 17'; Pen: Harrison (1/1) 27'

Shaftesbury Park
Referee: Alex Thomas

Bye/s: Leicester Tigers Women

=== Round 15 ===
11 May 2024
14:30

(1 BP) Saracens Women	54–21	Sale Sharks Women
Try: Breach (2) 2' c, 7' m Bridger 11' c Campbell 15' c Gondwe 38' c Rose 65' c Gregson 78' c G. Evans 80' c Con: Harrison (7/8) 3', 12', 16', 39', 66', 79', 80+1'	Report	Try: Swailes 25' c Harper 48' c S. Jones 59'; Con: Law (2/2) 26, 49'; V.A. Irwin (1/1) 60'

StoneX Stadium
Referee: Jonathan Cook

11 May 2024
15:00

(1 BP) Harlequins Women	47–12	Leicester Tigers Women
Try: Layzell 8' c Brown 12' c Powell 28' c Cromack 42' c Lochner 71' c Mayhew 76' m Hele 80' c Con: Cromack (6/7) 9', 13', 29', 43', 72', 80+1'	Report	Try: McGhie (2) 19' c, 46' m Con: Nicholas (1/2) 20'

Twickenham Stoop
Referee: Andy Wigley

11 May 2024
15:00

Trailfinders Women	10–40	Exeter Chiefs Women (1 BP)
Try: Dow (2) 78' m, 80' m	Report	Try: Moloney (2) 12' c, 57' c Allen 18' m Wilkins 46' c Sinclair 48' c Orchard 72' c Con: Wilkins (5/6) 13', 47', 49', 58', 73'

Trailfinders Sports Ground
Referee: Nikki O'Donnell

12 May 2024
15:00

(1 BP) Loughborough Lightning	26–61	Gloucester-Hartpury (1 BP)
Try: Keates 7' m Mueller (2) 19' c, 48' c O'Donnell 68' c Con: Scarratt (3/4) 20', 49', 69'	Report	Try: Heard (2) 4' c, 35' c Matthews (2) 13' c, 23' c Hunt 28' c N. Jones (2) 44' m, 72' c Delgado 52' c Else 57' c Con: Sing (8/9) 5', 14, 24', 29', 36', 53', 58', 73'

Franklin's Gardens
Referee: Holly Wood

Bye/s: Bristol Bears Women

=== Round 16 ===
18 May 2024
14:00

(1 BP) Loughborough Lightning	38–19	Harlequins Women
Try: Westcombe-Evans (4) 2' m, 42' m, 62' c, 71' c Trevarthen 17' c Scarratt 77' c Con: Scarratt (4/6) 18', 63', 72', 78'	Report	Try: Spurrier 23' c Phillips 32' c Cromack 60' m Con: Cromack (2/3) 24', 33'

Franklin's Gardens
Referee: Jonathan Cook

19 May 2024
14:00

(1 BP) Gloucester-Hartpury	59–12	Trailfinders Women
Try: N. Jones 5' c Sing 10' m Beckett 14' c Muir 19' c Aldcroft 30' c Venner (2) 49' m, 56' c Hale 54' c Lewis 74' c Con: Sing (4/6) 6', 15', 20', 31'; George (3/3) 55', 57', 75'	Report	Try: McQuade 61' c Inman 67' m Con: Inman (1/2) 62'

Kingsholm
Referee: Richard Gordon

19 May 2024
15:00

Exeter Chiefs Women	7–57	Saracens Women (1 BP)
Try: Buchanan 62' c Con: Wilkins (1/1) 63'	Report	Try: Gregson (2) 1' c, 32' m Rose 8' m Grant 21' c McKenna (2) 24' c, 71' m Wyrwas (2) 40' c, 59' c Field 80' c Con: Harrison (6/9) 2', 22', 25', 40+1', 60', 80+1'

Sandy Park
Referee: Alex Thomas

19 May 2024
15:30

(1 BP) Bristol Bears Women	62–24	Leicester Tigers Women (1 BP)
Try: Bevan (2) 5' m, 38' c David 27' c Pam 29' c R. Marston-Mulhearn 40' c Lovibond (2) 57' c, 62' m Botterman 66' c A. Joyce-Butchers 75' m Jackson 79' c Con: Reed (7/10) 28', 30', 39', 40+1', 58', 67', 80'	Report	Try: Cokayne (3) 9' m, 33' c, 70' c N. Jones 45' m Con: Nicholas (2/4) 34', 71'

Shaftesbury Park
Referee: Hamish Grant

Bye/s: Sale Sharks Women

=== Round 17 ===
25 May 2024
12:00

(1 BP) Saracens Women	33–31	Gloucester-Hartpury (2 BP)
Try: Clifford 20' c Gregson 30' m Campbell 40' c P. Cleall 59' c Hunt 65' c Con: Harrison (4/5) 21', 40+1', 60', 66'	Report	Try: Brock 2' m Perry 51' c N. Jones (2) 55' c, 72' m Beckett 62' c Con: Sing (3/5) 52', 56', 63'

StoneX Stadium
Referee: Holly Wood

25 May 2024
15:00

Harlequins Women	25–47	Bristol Bears Women (1 BP)
Try: Neumann (2) 8' c, 25' m Konkel-Roberts 71' c Con: Cromack (1/2) 9'; Tuima (1/1) 72'; Pen: Cromack (2/2) 16', 21'	Report	Try: R. Marston-Mulhearn 12' c Wills (3) 18' c, 22' m, 78' c Bonner (2) 30' c, 62' c Burns 80' c Con: Reed (6/7) 13', 19', 31', 63', 79', 80+1'

Twickenham Stoop
Referee: Alex Thomas

25 May 2024
15:00

Leicester Tigers Women	21–36	Sale Sharks Women (1 BP)
Try: Cockburn 16' c Cokayne (2) 35' c, 60' c Con: Feury (3/3) 17', 36', 61'	Report	Try: Perrin 8' c Wright 23' c Rigoni 32' c Thorpe 49' c Delany 79' m Con: Law (4/5) 9', 25', 33', 50'; Pen: Law (1/1) 69'

Welford Road
Referee: Mike Hudson

25 May 2024
16:45

(1 BP) Trailfinders Women	18–19	Loughborough Lightning
Try: Dow 7' m Laflin 33' c Con: Green (1/2) 34'; Pen: Green (2/2) 18', 26'	Report	Try: Keates 4' c Treder (2) 37' m, 57' c Con: Scarratt (2/3) 5', 58'

Trailfinders Sports Ground
Referee: Hamish Grant

Bye/s: Exeter Chiefs Women

=== Round 18 ===
2 June 2024
15:00

(1 BP) Exeter Chiefs Women	59–27	Leicester Tigers Women (1 BP)
Try: Rogers 10' m Bradley 14' c Clarke (2) 27' c, 34' c Buchanan 38' m Feaunati (2) 46' c, 49' c Doidge (2) 70' c, 79' c Con: Cantorna (7/9) 15', 28', 35', 47', 59', 71', 80'	Report	Try: Gallagher 24' c Nicholas 31' m Brody 62' c Fray 74' m Con: Feury (2/4) 25', 63'; Pen: Feury (1/1) 3'

Sandy Park
Referee: Holly Wood

2 June 2024
15:00

(1 BP) Harlequins Women	27–54	Trailfinders Women (1 BP)
Try: Konkel-Roberts 19' m Tuima 35' c Powell 53' c Shillaker 76' m Con: Cromack (2/4) 36', 54'; Pen: Cromack (1/1) 11'	Report	Try: Dow (2) 1' c, 31' c Crake 4' m Cox 13' c Schell 39' c Riffonneau 51' c Con: Green (5) 2', 14', 32', 40', 52'

Twickenham Stoop
Referee: Sara Cox

2 June 2024
15:00

(1 BP) Loughborough Lightning	24–33	Saracens Women (1 BP)
Try: Rollie (2) 12' c, 71' c Westcombe-Evans 23' m Mataitoga 49' m Con: Scarratt (2/4) 13', 72'	Report	Try: Kasolo 18' c Infante 31' c Field 57' c Sellors (2) 60' c, 63' m Con: Harrison (4/5) 19', 32', 58', 61'

Franklin's Gardens
Referee: Harry Walbaum

2 June 2024
15:00

(1 BP) Sale Sharks Women	27–24	Bristol Bears Women (2 BP)
Try: Delany 5' m V.E. Irwin 18' m Thorpe (2) 26' m, 65' m Perris-Redding 52' c Con: Law (1/4) 53'	Report	Try: Atkin-Davies (2) 9' m, 24' m A. Joyce-Butchers 36' c Lovibond 57' c Con: Reed (1/3) 37'; Aitchison (1/1) 58'

Heywood Road
Referee: Richard Gordon

Bye/s: Gloucester-Hartpury

== Play-offs ==
As in previous seasons, the top four teams in the table, following the conclusion of the regular season, contest the play-off semi-finals on 9 June 2024 in a 1st vs 4th and 2nd vs 3rd format, with the higher ranking team having home advantage. The two winners of the semi-finals then meet in the final on 22 June 2024.

On 21 May 2024, it was announced that, as the highest seed, Gloucester-Hartpury would play in the 16:30 semi-final. On 25 May 2024, Saracens were confirmed as the second team to qualify as home semi-finalists.

Semi-finals
9 June 2024 - Kingsholm
Gloucester-Hartpury	50
Exeter Chiefs Women	19
9 June 2024 - StoneX Stadium
Saracens Women	21
Bristol Bears Women	29

Final
22 June 2024 - Sandy Park
Gloucester-Hartpury	36
Bristol Bears Women	24

=== Semi-finals ===
9 June 2024
14:00

Saracens Women (2)	21–29	(3) Bristol Bears Women
Try: Grant 12' c Hunt 26' c Penalty try 54'; Con: Harrison (2/2) 12', 26'	Report	Try: Atkin-Davies (3) 34' m, 43' c, 68' c Keight 49' m Bonner 75' m Con: Reed (2/5) 44', 68'

StoneX Stadium
Referee: Alex Thomas

Team details

FB	15	(England) Jess Breach
RW	14	(Scotland) Coreen Grant		(substituted off) 62'
OC	13	(England) Sydney Gregson		(substituted off) 78'
IC	12	(England) Sarah McKenna
LW	11	(Canada) Paige Farries
FH	10	(England) Zoe Harrison
SH	9	(England) Ella Wyrwas		(substituted off) 65'
N8	8	(England) Poppy Cleall		(substituted off) 67'
OF	7	(England) Marlie Packer (c)
BF	6	(Canada) Sophie de Goede
RL	5	(Canada) Emma Taylor	(yellow card) 73' to end'
LL	4	(Wales) Georgia Evans		(substituted off) 73'
TP	3	(England) Kelsey Clifford		(substituted off) 51'
HK	2	(England) May Campbell		(substituted off) 73'
LP	1	(Canada) McKinley Hunt		(substituted off) 46'
Substitutions:
HK	16	(England) Bryony Field		(substituted on) 73'
PR	17	(England) Akina Gondwe		(substituted on) 46'
PR	18	(Wales) Donna Rose		(substituted on) 51'
LK	19	(Scotland) Louise McMillan		(substituted on) 73'
FL	20	(England) Sharifa Kasolo		(substituted on) 67'
SH	21	(England) Leanne Infante	(yellow card) 72' to end'	(substituted on) 65'
CE	22	(England) Sophie Bridger		(substituted on) 78'
WG	23	(United States) Lotte Clapp		(substituted on) 62'
Coach:
(England) Alex Austerberry

FB	15	(England) Ella Lovibond		(substituted off) 67'
RW	14	(England) Reneeqa Bonner	(yellow card) 54' to 64'
OC	13	(England) Phoebe Murray
IC	12	(England) Holly Aitchison
LW	11	(England) Deborah Wills		(substituted off) 29'
FH	10	(England) Amber Reed (cc)
SH	9	(Wales) Keira Bevan		(substituted off) 79'
N8	8	(England) Rownita Marston-Mulhearn
OF	7	(Scotland) Evie Gallagher
BF	6	(Wales) Alisha Joyce-Butchers
RL	5	(England) Abbie Ward (cc)
LL	4	(England) Delaney Burns		(substituted off) 65'
TP	3	(England) Hannah Botterman
HK	2	(England) Lark Atkin-Davies
LP	1	(England) Simi Pam
Substitutions:
HK	16	(England) Jess Sprague
PR	17	(England) Holly Phllips
PR	18	(England) Ellie Marston-Mulhearn
LK	19	(England) Hollie Cunningham		(substituted on) 65'
FL	20	(England) Gabriella Nigrelli
SH	21	(England) Lucy Burgess		(substituted on) 79'
CE	22	(Scotland) Meryl Smith		(substituted on) 67'
WG	23	(Wales) Courtney Keight		(substituted on) 29'
Coach:
(England) Dave Ward

9 June 2024
16:30

Gloucester-Hartpury (1)	50–19	(4) Exeter Chiefs Women
Try: George (2) 2' c, 26' c Venner 8' m Hendy 30' c Muir 44' c Beckett 52' m Sing 57' m Tuipulotu 65' c Con: Sing (5/8) 3', 28', 31', 45', 66'	Report	Try: Johnson 47' c Moloney 69' c Buchanan 80' m Con: Wilkins (1/1) 48'; Tessier (1/2) 70'

Kingsholm
Referee: Harry Walbaum

Team details

FB	15	(England) Emma Sing
RW	14	(England) Mia Venner
OC	13	(Wales) Hannah Jones	(substituted off) 54'
IC	12	(England) Tatyana Heard
LW	11	(England) Pip Hendy
FH	10	(Wales) Lleucu George	(substituted off) 63'
SH	9	(England) Natasha Hunt (cc)	(substituted off) 63'
N8	8	(England) Zoe Aldcroft (cc)
OF	7	(Wales) Bethan Lewis
BF	6	(England) Georgia Brock
RL	5	(Ireland) Sam Monaghan	(substituted off) 54'
LL	4	(England) Sarah Beckett	(substituted off) 59'
TP	3	(England) Maud Muir	(substituted off) 59'
HK	2	(Ireland) Neve Jones	(substituted off) 67'
LP	1	(England) Mackenzie Carson	(substituted off) 45'
Substitutions:
HK	16	(England) Amy Dale	(substituted on) 67'
PR	17	(England) Ellena Perry	(substituted on) 45'
PR	18	(Wales) Sisilia Tuipulotu	(substituted on) 59'
FL	19	(Wales) Kate Williams	(substituted on) 54'
FL	20	(Spain) Carmen Castellucci	(substituted on) 59'
SH	21	(England) Bianca Blackburn	(substituted on) 63'
FH	22	(England) Millie Hyett	(substituted on) 63'
CE	23	(England) Rachel Lund	(substituted on) 54'
Coach:
(Wales) Sean Lynn

FB	15	(Canada) Alex Tessier
RW	14	(England) Katie Buchanan
OC	13	(England) Merryn Doidge
IC	12	(United States) Gabby Cantorna	(substituted off) 34'
LW	11	(England) Connie Clarke
FH	10	(Wales) Robyn Wilkins	(substituted off) 67'
SH	9	(England) Brooke Bradley
N8	8	(United States) Rachel Johnson
OF	7	(England) Maisy Allen	(substituted off) 41'
BF	6	(United States) Ebony Jefferies	(substituted off) 41' (substituted on) 75'
RL	5	(England) Poppy Leitch (c)
LL	4	(Netherlands) Linde van der Velden	(substituted off) 62'
TP	3	(Canada) DaLeaka Menin	(substituted off) 63'
HK	2	(Canada) Emily Tuttosi	(substituted off) 54'
LP	1	(United States) Hope Rogers	(substituted off) 71'
Substitutions:
HK	16	(Ireland) Cliodhna Moloney	(substituted on) 54'
PR	17	(Canada) Demi Swann	(substituted on) 71'
PR	18	(England) Lizzie Hanlon	(substituted on) 63'
LK	19	(England) Niamh Orchard	(substituted on) 62'
FL	20	(England) Harriet Millar-Mills	(substituted on) 41'
FL	21	(England) Maddie Feaunati	(substituted on) 41' (substituted off) 75'
SH	22	(England) Taz Bricknell	(substituted on) 67'
WG	23	(England) Naomi Brennan	(substituted on) 34'
Coach:
(England) Susie Appleby

=== Final ===
22 June 2024
15:00

Gloucester-Hartpury (1)	36–24	(3) Bristol Bears Women
	Report

Sandy Park
Referee: Sara Cox

== Leading scorers ==
Note: Flags to the left of player names indicate national team as has been defined under World Rugby eligibility rules, or primary nationality for players who have not yet earned international senior caps. Players may hold one or more non-WR nationalities.

=== Most points ===
As of 2 June 2024

Rank	Player	Club	Points
1	(England) Emma Sing	Gloucester-Hartpury	125
2	(United States) Gabby Cantorna	Exeter	95
3	(England) Zoe Harrison	Saracens	86
4	(England) Amber Reed	Bristol	79
5	(Canada) Sophie de Goede	Saracens	74
6	(England) Ellie Green	Trailfinders	71
7	(England) Lagi Tuima	Harlequins	61
8	(England) Ella Cromack	Harlequins	60
8	(England) Abigail Dow	Trailfinders	60
10	(England) Megan Jones	Leicester	67

=== Most tries ===
As of 2 June 2024

Rank	Player	Club	Tries
1	(England) Abby Dow	Trailfinders	12
2	(United States) Kathryn Treder	Loughborough	11
3	(England) Sydney Gregson	Saracens	10
3	(England) Marlie Packer	Saracens	10
3	(Ireland) Neve Jones	Gloucester-Hartpury	10
6	(England) Sarah Beckett	Gloucester-Hartpury	9
6	(England) Claudia MacDonald	Exeter	9
6	(Scotland) Lana Skeldon	Bristol	9
6	(England) Bo Westcombe-Evans	Loughborough	9
10	4 players tied		8

== Discipline ==
=== Citings/bans ===
- Note: The cited player's club is listed in **bold italics**.

Player	Match	Match date	Law breached	Result	Ref
(Ireland) Shannon Ikahihifo	**Trailfinders** vs. Harlequins	18 November 2023	9.13–Dangerous Tackling (Red card)	3-match ban (Note: The three-match suspension is reduced to two matches, subject to the player's completion of the World Rugby Coaching Intervention Programme.)	
(England) Zoe Harrison	Trailfinders vs. **Saracens**	25 November 2023	9.27–Acts Contrary to Good Sportmanship (Citing)	1-match ban	
(Canada) Demi Swann	**Exeter** vs. Bristol	26 November 2023	9.27–Acts Contrary to Good Sportmanship (Citing)	1-match ban	
(England) Emily Robinson	**Harlequins** vs. Saracens	2 December 2023	9.12–Striking with the Head (Red card)	5-match ban	
(New Zealand) Lizzie Goulden	**Gloucester-Hartpury** vs. Loughborough	6 January 2024	9.13–Dangerous Tackling (Citing)	3-match ban	
(Wales) Kelsey Jones	**Gloucester-Hartpury** vs. Saracens	20 January 2024	9.13–Dangerous Tackling (Red card)	3-match ban	
(Scotland) Mhairi Grieve	Exeter vs. **Sale**	11 February 2024	9.13–Dangerous Tackling (Citing)	3-match ban	
(Netherlands) Linde van der Velden	Gloucester-Hartpury vs. **Exeter**	2 March 2024	9.13–Dangerous Tackling (Citing)	3-match ban	
(England) Poppy Cleall	**Saracens** vs. Leicester	3 March 2024	9.27–Acts Contrary to Good Sportmanship (Citing)	2-match ban	

== Allianz Cup ==
2023–24 Allianz Cup
- Countries: England
- Number of teams: 10 (before 17 October 2023); 9 (after 17 October 2023)
- Date: 22 September 2023 – 28 April 2024
- Champions: Saracens Women (1st title)
- Runners-up: Bristol Bears Women
- Matches played: 24
- Tries scored: 214 (average 8.9 per match)

Official website
- www.thepwr.com

In the Allianz Cup, teams were drawn into pools of five. Each team plays every team in their pool once, home or away, as well as having one bye week.

Teams that secure the top two positions within their respective pools will advance to a playoff for the 1st to 4th rankings. The winning team from the initial bracket will move on to the final, while the losing team will compete in the 3rd place playoff. Teams finishing in third or fourth within their pools will participate in a playoff for the 4th to 8th rankings. The winner of the initial bracket will progress to the 4th place play-off, while the losing team will be part of the 6th place play-off. Teams that are last at the end of the pool stage will participate in a two-legged play-off for the 9th to 10th position, with the overall winner determined by the aggregate score.

The fixtures were announced on 9 August 2023.

=== Pool A ===
2023–24 Allianz Cup Pool A Table
Pos	Team	Pld	W	D	L	PF	PA	PD	TF	TA	TB	LB	Pts	Qualification (Note: Results from matches involving Worcester Warriors were deleted from record, after Worcester withdrew from the competition.)
1	Bristol Bears Women	3	3	0	0	157	31	+126	25	4	3	0	15	Qualifies for semi-finals
2	Exeter Chiefs Women	3	2	0	1	151	76	+75	32	13	2	0	10	Qualifies for semi-finals
3	Sale Sharks Women	3	1	0	2	60	138	−78	10	22	1	0	5	Qualifies for the 5th/6th-place play-off
4	Leicester Tigers Women	3	0	0	3	29	152	−123	4	26	0	0	0	Qualifies for the 7th-9th-place play-off
5	Worcester Warriors Women	0	0	0	0	0	0	0	0	0	0	0	0	

Notes:

Points allocation
Teams are awarded:
- Four points are awarded for a win.
- Two points are awarded for a draw.
- A try bonus point is awarded to teams that score four or more tries in a match.
- A losing bonus point is awarded to teams that lose a match by seven or fewer points.

Tie-breaking criteria
If teams are level at any stage, tiebreakers are applied in the following order:
1. Number of matches won
2. Difference between points for and against
3. Total number of points for
4. Total number of tries scored

==== Round 1 ====
~~22 September 2023~~
~~19:30~~

~~Worcester Warriors Women~~	~~7–39~~ (Note: Results and player scores from matches involving Worcester Warriors were deleted from record, after Worcester withdrew from the competition.)	~~Exeter Chiefs Women (1 BP)~~
Try: ~~Parry 22' c~~ Con: ~~Green (1/1) 23'~~	~~Report~~	Try: ~~Langford 8' c~~ ~~Orchard 19' m~~ ~~Ounsley 25' m~~ ~~Moloney 34' m~~ ~~Hanlon 46' c~~ ~~Sinclair 60' m~~ ~~Harris 79' m~~ Con: ~~Dadds (1/4) 9'~~; ~~Powdrell (1/3) 47'~~

~~Sixways Stadium~~
Referee: ~~Richard Gordon~~

23 September 2023
14:00

(1 BP) Sale Sharks Women	36–19	Leicester Tigers Women
Try: V.E. Irwin (2) 16' c, 33' m Swailes 19' c Delany 44' c Bawden 66' m Thorpe 80' m Con: Law (3/4) 17', 20', 45'	Report	Try: McBrien 10' c Turner 50'; Daley 71' m Con: Collie (2/3) 11', 51'

Heywood Road
Referee: Rebecca Rees

Bye/s: Bristol Bears Women

==== Round 2 ====
~~30 September 2023~~
~~12:00~~

~~(1 BP) Leicester Tigers Women~~	~~25–45~~	~~Worcester Warriors Women (1 BP)~~
Try: ~~Evans (2) 21' m, 55' m~~ ~~Childs 45' m~~ ~~Daley 67' m~~ ~~Bird 80' m~~	~~Report~~	Try: ~~Gondwe 5' m~~ ~~Brincat 12' m~~ ~~Green 24' c~~ ~~Parry 33' c~~ ~~Laflin 51' c~~ ~~Clarke 59' c~~ ~~England 61' c~~ Con: ~~Green (5/7) 25', 34', 52', 60', 62'~~

~~Oval Park Training Ground~~
Referee: ~~Charles Gayther~~

1 October 2023
15:00

Exeter Chiefs Women	21–52	Bristol Bears Women (1 BP)
Try: Penalty try 7'; Fryday 31' c Sams 66' c Con: Powdrell (1/1) 32'; Dadds (1/1) 67'	Report	Try: Burgess 1' c Bonner 3' m Murray 22' c Pam 35' c Wills 44' m Molloy 61' c Jaques 74' c Nigrelli 79' c Con: Nigrelli (6/8) 2', 23', 36', 62', 75', 80'

Sandy Park
Referee: Katherine Ritchie

Bye/s: Sale Sharks Women

==== Round 3 ====
14 October 2023
13:00

(1 BP) Bristol Bears Women	55–3	Leicester Tigers Women
Try: Molloy 15' m Hesketh 21' c Crompton (3) 24' m, 32' m, 80' c Bonner 34' c Sprague 48' m David 65' c Burns 68' c Con: Nigrelli (2/6) 22', 35'; Hesketh (3/3) 66', 69', 80'	Report	Pen: Collie (1/2) 9'

Shaftesbury Park
Referee: Andrew Jackson

~~14 October 2023~~
~~14:00~~

~~(1 BP) Worcester Warriors Women~~	~~49–14~~	~~Sale Sharks Women~~
Try: ~~Clarke 40' c~~ ~~Laflin (3) 50' c, 65' c, 79' m~~ ~~McNaney 67' c~~ ~~Pohjanheimo 74' m~~ ~~England 77' m~~ Con: ~~Green (4/4) 41', 51', 66', 68'~~; Pen: ~~Green (2/2) 7', 61'~~	~~Report~~	Try: ~~Perrin 22' c~~ ~~Bowman 46' c~~ Con: ~~Cookland (2/2) 23', 47'~~

~~Sixways~~
Referee: ~~Hamish Smales~~

Bye/s: Exeter Chiefs Women

==== Round 4 ====
~~21 October 2023~~
~~13:00~~

~~Bristol Bears Women~~	Cancelled	~~Worcester Warriors Women~~

~~Shaftesbury Park~~

21 October 2023
15:00

(1 BP) Exeter Chiefs Women	69–17	Sale Sharks Women
Try: Sinclair 1' c Doidge (2) 13' m, 38' c Millar-Mills (3) 16' m, 30' c, 76' c Preece (2) 24' c, 26' m Harris 35' m Powdrell 61' c Middlebrooke 66' c Con: Cunningham (7/11) 2', 25', 31', 39', 62', 67', 77'	Report	Try: Swailes 5' m Antwis 47' c Perrin 59' m Con: V.A. Irwin (1/3) 48'

Sandy Park

Bye/s: Leicester Tigers Women

==== Round 5 ====
28 October 2023
14:00

Leicester Tigers Women	7–61	Exeter Chiefs Women (1 BP)
Try: Tutt 28' c Con: Collie (1/1) 29'	Report	Try: Jefferies (3) 4' c, 34' m, 73' m Sinclair 7' m Preece 30' m Bradley (2) 42' m, 44' c Buchanan 59' c Powdrell 65' m van der Velden 78' m Middlebrooke 80' m Con: Cunningham (3/11) 5', 45', 60'

Welford Road
Referee: Nikki O'Donnell

28 October 2023
14:00

Sale Sharks Women	7–50	Bristol Bears Women (1 BP)
Try: Brown 79' c Con: White (1/1) 80'	Report	Try: Phillips 8' c R. Marston-Mulhearn 21' m Wills (3) 40' m, 48' c, 74' c Murray 42' c Nigrelli 64' c Hesketh 69' c Con: Lovibond (3/5) 9', 43', 49'; Nigrelli (2/2) 65', 75'; Hesketh (1/1) 70'

Heywood Road
Referee: Henry Pearson

Bye/s: Worcester Warriors Women

=== Pool B ===
2023–24 Allianz Cup Pool A Table
Pos	Team	Pld	W	D	L	PF	PA	PD	TF	TA	TB	LB	Pts	Qualification
1	Saracens Women	4	3	0	1	145	102	+43	23	16	4	1	17	Qualifies for semi-finals
2	Gloucester-Hartpury	4	3	0	1	98	93	+5	16	15	2	1	15	Qualifies for semi-finals
3	Loughborough Lightning	4	2	0	2	111	93	+18	18	15	3	1	12	Qualifies for the 5th/6th-place play-off
4	Harlequins Women	4	2	0	2	110	107	+3	17	17	3	1	12	Qualifies for the 7th-9th-place play-off
5	Trailfinders Women	4	0	0	4	67	136	−69	10	21	1	1	2	Qualifies for the 7th-9th-place play-off

Points allocation
Teams are awarded:
- Four points are awarded for a win.
- Two points are awarded for a draw.
- A try bonus point is awarded to teams that score four or more tries in a match.
- A losing bonus point is awarded to teams that lose a match by seven or fewer points.

Tie-breaking criteria
If teams are level at any stage, tiebreakers are applied in the following order:
1. Number of matches won
2. Difference between points for and against
3. Total number of points for
4. Total number of tries scored

==== Round 1 ====
23 September 2023
17:00

Gloucester-Hartpury	19–17	Loughborough Lightning (1 BP)
Try: Venner (2) 4' m, 22' c Sing 66' c Con: Manns (2/3) 23', 67'	Report	Try: Tasker 9' m Scantlebury 44' m Meuller 58' c Con: Green (1/3) 58'

Hartpury University Stadium
Referee: Holly Wood

23 September 2023
19:00

(2 BP) Saracens Women	29–36	Harlequins Women (1 BP)
Try: Field (3) 10' c, 56' m, 62' m Gregson 13' c Taylor 24' m Con: MacDougall (2/5) 11', 14'	Report	Try: B. Cleall (2) 2' c, 20' c Shillaker (2) 37' m, 64' m Heryet 40' m Layzell 52' c Con: Scott (2/4) 3', 21'; Cromack (1/2) 52'

StoneX Stadium
Referee: Katherine Ritchie

Bye/s: Trailfinders Women

==== Round 2 ====
30 September 2023
14:00

(1 BP) Harlequins Women	31–21	Trailfinders Women
Try: Layzell (2) 22' c, 56' c Shillaker 32' c B. Cleall 49' c Con: Scott (3/3) 23', 33', 50'; Cromack (1/1) 57'; Pen: Cromack (1/1) 75'	Report	Try: Pursglove 37' c Schell 47' c Boatman 70' c Con: Schell (1/1) 38'; Inman (2/2) 48', 71'

Twickenham Stoop
Referee: Joe James

30 September 2023
17:15

(1 BP) Loughborough Lightning	25–33	Saracens Women (1 BP)
Try: Davey 4' m Morrall 54' m Hibbert-Jones 65' c Shrestha 75' m Con: Green (1/3) 65'; Pen: Green (1/1) 28'	Report	Try: Penalty try 19'; Tansley 39' m Gregson 43' c Moore 60' c Infante 72' c Con: Linkins (3/4) 44', 60', 72'

Franklin's Gardens
Referee: Jack Makepeace

Bye/s: Gloucester-Hartpury

==== Round 3 ====
14 October 2023
14:00

(1 BP) Harlequins Women	29–38	Loughborough Lightning (1 BP)
Try: Brown (3) 16' c, 46' m, 77' m Heryet 39' c B. Cleall 55' m Con: Tuima (2/4) 17', 40'	Report	Try: Davey (2) 10' m, 42' c Trevarthen 25' c Westcombe-Evans (2) 27' c, 67' m Tasker 60' c Con: Green (4/6) 26', 28', 42', 61'

Twickenham Stoop
Referee: Jack Makepeace

14 October 2023
15:00

(2 BP) Trailfinders Women	24–29	Gloucester-Hartpury (1 BP)
Try: Crake 10' c McQuade (2) 35' m, 64' c Wilson-Hardy 54' m Con: Inman (2/3) 11', 64'	Report	Try: Lund 14' m Hendy 20' c Constable 27' m Shermer 43' m Richards 61' c Con: Goulden (2/5) 21', 61'

Trailfinders Sports Ground
Referee: Alex Thomas

Bye/s: Saracens Women

==== Round 4 ====
21 October 2023
14:00

Gloucester-Hartpury	19–14	Harlequins Women (1 BP)
Try: Hendy (2) 28' c, 57' m Venner 43' c Con: Goulden (2/3) 29', 44'	Report	Try: Brown 10' c Duffy 49' c Con: Cromack (2/2) 11', 50'

Hartpury University Stadium
Referee: Jonathan Cook

21 October 2023
15:00

Trailfinders Women	10–45	Saracens Women (1 BP)
Try: Cooksey 15' m Crake 23' m	Report	Try: Kasolo 11' m Taylor 19' m Gregson 36' c Flanagan (2) 38' c, 66' c Field 58' c Campbell 80' c Con: Williams (2/4) 36', 38'; Linkins (3/3) 51', 63', 80'

Trailfinders Sports Ground
Referee: Philip Russell

Bye/s: Loughborough Lightning

==== Round 5 ====
28 October 2023
14:00

(1 BP) Loughborough Lightning	31–12	Trailfinders Women
Try: Duguid 1' c Scantlebury (2) 54' c, 60' m Westcombe-Evans 72' m Weaver 75' c Con: Green (3/5) 2', 55', 76'	Report	Try: Burnfield 32' m Inman 80' c Con: Green (1/1) 80+1'

Loughborough University
Referee: Jack Sutton

28 October 2023
14:30

(1 BP) Saracens Women	38–31	Gloucester-Hartpury (2 BP)
Try: Campbell (2) 3' m, 29' m P. Cleall 17' c Green 35' c M. Evans 44' c Loyola 75' c Con: Williams (3/5) 18', 36', 45'; MacDougall (1/1) 76'	Report	Try: Tandy (2) 13' c, 25' m Lund 68' c Goulden 70' m Cowan 78' c Con: Goulden (3/5) 14', 69', 79'

StoneX Stadium
Referee: Simon Waite

Bye/s: Harlequins Women

=== Cup play-offs ===
==== 7th-9th place play-off ====
2023–24 Allianz Cup 7th-9th Place Play-off Table
Pos	Team	Pld	W	D	L	PF	PA	PD	TF	TA	TB	LB	Pts	Qualification
1	Trailfinders Women	2	2	0	0	96	36	+60	13	6	2	0	10	Awarded 7th place
2	Harlequins Women	2	1	0	1	64	61	+3	10	8	2	0	6	Awarded 8th place
3	Leicester Tigers Women	2	0	0	2	24	87	−63	4	13	0	0	0	Awarded 9th place

Points allocation
Teams are awarded:
- Four points are awarded for a win.
- Two points are awarded for a draw.
- A try bonus point is awarded to teams that score four or more tries in a match.
- A losing bonus point is awarded to teams that lose a match by seven or fewer points.

Tie-breaking criteria
If teams are level at any stage, tiebreakers are applied in the following order:
1. Number of matches won
2. Difference between points for and against
3. Total number of points for
4. Total number of tries scored

===== 1st leg =====
13 April 2024
12:30

Leicester Tigers Women	19–33	Harlequins Women
Try: Gallagher 57' c Feury 62' m Brody 70' c Con: Feury (2/3) 58', 71'	Report	Try: Mullen 8' c Layzell 12' m Mayhew 22' c Dobson 35' c Hele 64' c Con: Cromack (4/5) 9', 23', 36', 65'

Welford Road
Referee: Jonathan Cook

Bye/s: Trailfinders Women

===== 2nd leg =====
21 April 2024
14:00

Trailfinders Women	54–5	Leicester Tigers Women
Try: Gwala 8' c Pinnock 12' c Burton (3) 44' c, 71' c, 76' c Inman 53' m Musgrove 54' c Swords 63' c Con: Green (7/8) 9', 13', 45', 55', 64', 72', 77'	Report	Try: Evans 25' m

Trailfinders Sports Ground
Referee: Holly Wood

Bye/s: Harlequins Women

===== 3rd leg =====
28 April 2024
14:00

Harlequins Women	31–42	Trailfinders Women
Try: Dobson 15' c Hele 26' m Layzell 45' m Shillaker 58' m Konkel-Roberts 73' c Con: Cromack (1/2) 16'; Tuima (1/3) 74'	Report	Try: Burnfield (2) 5' c, 30' c Laflin 12' c Burton 40' m Musgrove 54' c Con: Green (4/5) 6', 13', 31', 55'; Pen: Green (3/3) 9', 50', 78'

Twickenham Stoop
Referee: Neil Chivers

Bye/s: Leicester Tigers Women

==== 5th-6th place play-off ====
===== 1st leg =====
13 April 2024
14:00

Sale Sharks Women	12–22	Loughborough Lightning
Try: Duffy 20' m Panayiotou 78' c Con: Yamamoto (1/1) 79'	Report	Try: O'Donnell 35' c Green 41' c Calladine 63' m Con: Green (2/3) 36', 42'; Pen: Green (1/1) 7'

Heywood Road
Referee: Nikki O'Donnell

===== 2nd leg =====
27 April 2024
14:30

Loughborough Lightning	26–22	Sale Sharks Women
Try: Penalty try 23'; Duguid 32' c Meuller 55' c Westcombe-Evans 63' m Con: Green (2/3) 33', 55'	Report	Try: Tonkin (2) 6' m, 46' m Taylor-Roberts 40' c Sams 77' m Con: Duffy (1/3) 40+1'

Franklin's Gardens
Referee: Charlie Gayther

==== 1st-4th place play-off ====
Semi-finals
14 April 2024 - Shaftesbury Park
Bristol Bears Women	54
Gloucester-Hartpury	28
13 April 2024 - StoneX Stadium
Saracens Women	36
Exeter Chiefs Women	29

Final
28 April 2024 - Shaftesbury Park
Bristol Bears Women	17
Saracens Women	31
Third place
28 April 2024 - Sandy Park
Exeter Chiefs Women	14
Gloucester-Hartpury	26

===== Cup semi-finals =====
13 April 2024
14:30

Saracens Women	36–29	Exeter Chiefs Women
Try: B. Cleall (2) 5' m, 19' m Penalty try 31'; Kasolo 34' c Gondwe 40' c Clapp 43' m Con: MacDougall (2/5) 35', 40+1'	Report	Try: Rogers (2) 47' c, 56' m Nielson (2) 50' m, 73' m Bricknell 80' c Con: Wilkins (2/5) 48', 80+1'

StoneX Stadium
Referee: Alex Thomas

14 April 2024
15:00

Bristol Bears Women	54–28	Gloucester-Hartpury
Try: Bonner 2' m Murray 16' c Pam (2) 23' c, 64' c Wills 29' c Burgess 42' c White 60' c Nigrelli 75' c Con: Nigrelli (7/8) 16', 24', 29', 43', 61', 65', 76'	Report	Try: Brock 40' c Stafford 47' c Buggy 69' c Whitley 78' c Con: Goulden (4/4) 40', 48', 70', 79'

Shaftesbury Park
Referee: Hamish Grant

===== Third place play-off =====
28 April 2024
12:30

Exeter Chiefs Women	14–26	Gloucester-Hartpury
Try: Nielson 31' c Preece 69' c Con: Buchanan (1/1) 32'; Wilkins (1/1) 70'	Report	Try: Cowan 39' c Manns 41' c Goulden 62' m Else 67' c Con: Sing (2/3) 40', 42'; Manns (1/1) 68'

Sandy Park
Referee: Mike Hudson

===== Cup final =====
28 April 2024
14:00

Bristol Bears Women	17–31	Saracens Women
Try: Wills (2) 21' m, 32' c Lovibond 57' m Con: Nigrelli (1/3) 33'	Report	Try: Gondwe 36' c Clapp 43' m Field 53' m B. Cleall 65' c Campbell 75' c Con: MacDougall (3/5) 37', 66', 76'

Shaftesbury Park
Referee: George Selwood

Team details

FB	15	(England) Ella Lovibond
RW	14	(England) Reneeqa Bonner
OC	13	(Wales) Megan Webb
IC	12	(England) Phoebe Murray
LW	11	(England) Deborah Wills	(substituted off) 73'
FH	10	(England) Lucie Skuse
SH	9	(England) Lucy Burgess (c)	(substituted off) 73'
N8	8	(England) Rownita Marston-Mulhearn
OF	7	(Ireland) Claire Molloy	(substituted off) 54'
BF	6	(England) Gabriella Nigrelli
RL	5	(England) Delaney Burns
LL	4	(England) Hollie Cunningham	(substituted off) 54'
TP	3	(England) Ellie Marston-Mulhearn	(substituted off) 49'	(substituted on) 63'
HK	2	(England) Jess Sprague	(substituted off) 9'
LP	1	(England) Simi Pam
Substitutions:
HK	16	(England) Isabelle Jaques	(substituted on) 9'
PR	17	(England) Esme Bird
PR	18	(England) Nicola Beet	(substituted on) 49'	(substituted off) 63'
LK	19	(England) Christiana Balogun	(substituted on) 54'
FL	20	(England) Jenny Herring	(substituted on) 54'
FL	21	(England) Helene Caux
SH	22	(England) Ellie Lewis	(substituted on) 73'
WG	23	(England) Grace White	(substituted on) 73'
Coach:
(England) Dave Ward

FB	15	(England) Jemma-Jo Linkins
RW	14	(Scotland) Isla Alejandro	(substituted off) 67'
OC	13	(England) Cara Wardle
IC	12	(England) Sarah McKenna
LW	11	(United States) Lotte Clapp (cc)
FH	10	(England) Amelia MacDougall	(substituted off) 77'
SH	9	(England) Tori Sellors
N8	8	(England) Bryony Cleall	(substituted off) 67'	(substituted on) 77'
OF	7	(England) Sharifa Kasolo
BF	6	(England) May Campbell (cc)
RL	5	(Canada) Emma Taylor	(substituted off) 79'
LL	4	(England) Sonia Green		(substituted off) 77'
TP	3	(England) Carmen Tremelling	(substituted off) 79'
HK	2	(England) Bryony Field	(substituted off) 79'
LP	1	(England) Akina Gondwe
Substitutions:
HK	16	(Scotland) Nic Haynes	(substituted on) 79'
PR	17	(England) Chloe Flanagan	(substituted on) 79'
PR	18	(England) Lucy Lawford-Wilby
LK	19	(England) Sophie Tansley	(substituted on) 79'
FL	20	(Ireland) Grace Moore	(substituted on) 67'
SH	21	(England) Ella Wyrwas	(substituted on) 67'
FH	22	(Wales) Flo Williams	(substituted on) 77'
WG	23	(England) Lucy Biggs
Coach:
(England) Alex Austerberry

Player of the Match:
(England) Sharifa Kasolo (Saracens)

Assistant referees:
Veryan Boscawen
Alex Thomas
