= List of 2026–27 Premiership Women's Rugby transfers =

This is a list of player transfers involving Premiership Women's Rugby teams before or during the 2026–27 season.

The list consists of permanent player movements or temporary loan deals that have been officially confirmed, and are either to or from one of the nine teams competing in Premiership Women's Rugby in 2025–26. It is not unknown for confirmed transfers to be cancelled at a later date.

== Bristol Bears ==
=== Players in ===
- Lucy Burgess from Harlequins
- Orla Proctor from Harlequins
- Pip Hendy from Gloucester–Hartpury
- Ellie Kildunne from Harlequins
- Bethan Lewis from Gloucester–Hartpury
- Lia Green from Loughborough Lightning
- Zoe Evans from Leicester Tigers
- Ellen Scantlebury from Exeter Chiefs

=== Players out ===
- Alisha Joyce (released)
- Jasmine Joyce (released)
- Meg Varley (retired)
- Jenna De Vera (released)
- Savannah Picton-Powell (released)
- Stella Orrin (released)
- Pamphinette Buisa to Loughborough Lightning
- Chloe Daniels to Loughborough Lightning
- Tilly Ryall to Exeter Chiefs
- Rhea Clarke to Glasgow Warriors
- Elliann Clarke to Glasgow Warriors
- Emma Orr to Edinburgh
- Lauren Bailey to Gloucester–Hartpury
- Maisie Davies to Exeter Chiefs

== Exeter Chiefs ==
=== Players in ===
- Shya Pinnock from Trailfinders
- Tilly Ryall from Bristol Bears
- Maisie Davies from Bristol Bears
- Lizzie Lander from Bath
- Carys Phillips from Harlequins
- Honey Kerslake from Exeter College
- Deborah Wills from Saracens

=== Players out ===
- Abby Duguid (retired)
- Emily Tuttosi (retired)
- Edel McMahon (released)
- Hannah Bluck (released)
- Eleanor Febrey (released)
- Sabrina Poulin to Canada 7s
- Abby Middlebrooke to Harlequins
- Ellen Scantlebury to Bristol Bears
- Eva Sterritt to Harlequins
- Maisy Allen to Canterbury (short-term loan)

== Gloucester–Hartpury ==
=== Players in ===
- Gabrielle Vernier from Blagnac SCR
- Emerson Allen from Leicester Tigers
- Lauren Bailey from Bristol Bears
- Roisin Maher (promoted from academy)
- Hannah Smyth (promoted from academy)
- Ellie Wilson (promoted from academy)
- Vittoria Vecchini from Valsugana Rugby Padova
- Evelyn Clarke from Loughborough Lightning
- Bridie O'Gorman from NSW Warratahs

=== Players out ===
- Sisilia Tuipulotu to Harlequins
- Tatyana Heard to Sale Sharks
- Zoe Stratford to Sale Sharks
- Sarah Beckett to Sale Sharks
- Ellena Perry (retired)
- Bianca Blackburn (retired)
- Rachel Lund (retired)
- Pip Hendy to Bristol Bears
- Lizzie Goulden (released)
- Bethan Lewis to Bristol Bears
- Daisy Aspinall to Harlequins
- Kelsey Jones to Sale Sharks

== Harlequins ==
=== Players in ===
- Sisilia Tuipulotu from Gloucester–Hartpury
- Marlie Packer from Saracens
- Rosie Galligan from Saracens
- Abby Middlebrooke from Exeter Chiefs
- Daisy Aspinall from Gloucester–Hartpury
- Sara Mannini from Rugby Colorno
- Eva Sterritt from Exeter Chiefs
- Nina Mason from Life University

=== Players out ===
- Jade Konkel (retired)
- Laura Delgado (retired)
- Izzy Mayhew (retired)
- Sheree Cooper (retired)
- Hannah Duffy (retired)
- Heather Cowell (retired)
- Fiona McIntosh to Glasgow Warriors
- Coreen Grant to Edinburgh
- Lucy Burgess to Bristol Bears
- Orla Proctor to Bristol Bears
- Ellie Kildunne to Bristol Bears
- Freya Aucken to Sale Sharks
- Emma Swords (released)
- Jessie Spurrier (released)
- Jade Mullen (released)
- Lauren Fisher (released)
- Sophie Tansley (released)
- Layla Sae to Hurricanes Poua
- Liana Mikaele-Tu'u to Blues
- Iley Bailey (released)
- Izzy Hannay (released)
- Abbie Fleming to Leicester Tigers
- Lagi Tuima to Leicester Tigers
- Carys Phillips to Exeter Chiefs
- Beth Wilcock to Saracens
- Lisa Neumann to Leicester Tigers

== Leicester Tigers ==
=== Players in ===
- Tabua Tuinakauvadra from ACT Brumbies
- Coco Lindelauf from Blagnac SCR
- Freya Greensmith from Loughborough Lightning
- Cara Brincat from Trailfinders
- Halley Derera from Western Force
- Grace Freeman from Western Force
- Caitlyn Halse from NSW Waratahs
- Abbie Fleming from Harlequins
- Isobel McGuire-Evans from Sale Sharks
- Lagi Tuima from Harlequins
- Leah Brough from Lichfield
- Rachel Ehrecke from Loughborough Lightning
- Ashley Fernandez from ACT Brumbies
- Charlotte Seale from University of Nottingham
- Louisa Maynard from Lichfield
- Lucy Finch from Loughborough Lightning
- Lisa Neumann from Harlequins

=== Players out ===
- Kristin Bitter (released)
- Katherine Baverstock (released)
- Olivia Tallon (released)
- Charlotte Daley (released)
- Amber Schonert (released)
- Leah Heath (retired)
- Danielle Solly (retired)
- Emerson Allen to Gloucester–Hartpury
- Zoe Evans to Bristol Bears
- Emily Henrich to Stade Bordelais Women

== Loughborough Lightning ==
=== Players in ===
- Pamphinette Buisa from Bristol Bears
- Chloe Daniels from Bristol Bears
- Brooke Rempel from Brock University
- Kiki Idowu from University of British Columbia
- Rachel Smith from University of British Columbia
- Florence Symonds from University of British Columbia
- Ashton Adcock (promoted from academy)
- Aoibhe Kelly (promoted from academy)
- Ella Barnes (promoted from academy)
- Alice Bennett (promoted from academy)
- Izzy Clist (promoted from academy)
- Emily Heaps (promoted from academy)
- Lily Hickey (promoted from academy)
- Freya MacColl (promoted from academy)
- Imogen Mockford (promoted from academy)
- Alice Redfern (promoted from academy)
- Sasha Roberts (promoted from academy)
- Harli Stanton (promoted from academy)

=== Players out ===
- Christine Belisle (released)
- Isla Curphey (released)
- Paige Stathopoulos (released)
- Freya Greensmith to Leicester Tigers
- Lucia Scott to Glasgow Warriors
- Anne Young to Glasgow Warriors
- Becky Boyd to Glasgow Warriors
- Elis Martin to Edinburgh
- Leia Brebner-Holden to Edinburgh
- Kendall Waudby to Sale Sharks
- Tahlia Brody (released)
- Cath O'Donnell (retired)
- Lia Green to Bristol Bears
- Helen Nelson to Trailfinders
- Rachel Ehrecke to Leicester Tigers
- Bulou Mataitoga (released)
- Lucy Finch to Leicester Tigers
- Bo Westcombe-Evans to Trailfinders
- Evelyn Clarke to Gloucester–Hartpury

== Sale Sharks ==
=== Players in ===
- Tatyana Heard from Gloucester–Hartpury
- Zoe Stratford from Gloucester–Hartpury
- Sarah Beckett from Gloucester–Hartpury
- Kendall Waudby from Loughborough Lightning
- Freya Aucken from Harlequins
- Kelsey Jones from Gloucester–Hartpury

=== Players out ===
- Nikita Prothero (released)
- Molly Morrissey (released)
- Asia Hogan-Rochester (released)
- Evie Wills to Glasgow Warriors
- Rachel Philipps to Edinburgh
- Molly Wright (retired)
- Trudy Cowan (retired)
- Sophie Lewis (retired)
- Kay Jarrell-Searcy (retired)
- Isobel McGuire-Evans to Leicester Tigers

== Saracens ==
=== Players in ===
- Beth Wilcock from Harlequins
- Ellie Boatman from Trailfinders
- Kapoina Bailey from Denver Onyx
- Hann Humphreys from United States 7s
- Freda Tafuna from Lindenwood University
- Mona Lisa Tupou from ACT Brumbies

=== Players out ===
- Marlie Packer to Harlequins
- Rosie Galligan to Harlequins
- Beth Blacklock to La Rochelle
- Deborah Wills to Exeter Chiefs
- Laetitia Royer to Trailfinders
- Paige Farries (retired)

== Trailfinders ==
=== Players in ===
- Helen Nelson from Loughborough Lightning
- Teya Ashworth from UBC Thunderbirds
- Bo Westcombe-Evans from Loughborough Lightning
- Ruby Tui (unattached)
- Laetitia Royer from Saracens
- Isa Prins (unattached)
- Lizzie Gibson from Queen's University

=== Players out ===
- Shya Pinnock to Exeter Chiefs
- Cara Brincat to Leicester Tigers
- Kate Zackary (released)
- Celia Quansah (retired)
- Amelia Buckland-Hurry (released)
- Cana Williams (released)
- Emma Taylor (released)
- Georgia Ponsonby (released)
- Grace Moore (released)
- Isla Norman-Bell (released)
- Kim Grundy (released)
- Manon Johnes (released)
- Mica Evans (released)
- Mikiela Nelson (released)
- Sara Seye (released)
- Shannon Ikahihifo (released)
- Ellie Boatman to Saracens
