= 2018–19 Premier 15s =

- Countries: England
- Date: 8 September 2018 – 27 April 2019
- Champions: Saracens Women (2nd title)
- Runners-up: Harlequins Ladies
- Matches played: 93
- Top point scorer: (England) Lizzie Goulden (Wasps) (125 points)
- Top try scorer: (England) Kelly Smith (Gloucester-Hartpury) (24 tries)

Official website
- www.premier15s.com

The 2018–19 Premier 15s kicked-off on 18 September 2018. The tournament consisted of 18 rounds with the final being played on 27 April 2019. Saracens Women defeated Harlequins Ladies 33–17 in the finals and were crowned Champions.

== Teams ==
Saracens Women
Harlequins Ladies
Loughborough Lightning
Wasps Ladies
Gloucester-Hartpury
Bristol Bears Women
Richmond Women
Darlington Mowden Park Sharks
Firwood Waterloo Ladies
Worcester Valkyries

== Table ==
2018–19 Premier 15s Table
Pos	Team	Pld	W	D	L	PF	PA	PD	TB	LB	Pts	Qualification
1	Saracens Women (CH)	18	17	0	1	711	203	+508	15	1	84	Play-off place
2	Harlequins Ladies (RU)	18	15	1	2	733	246	+487	14	1	77	Play-off place
3	Loughborough Lightning (SF)	18	14	0	4	659	312	+347	14	2	72	Play-off place
4	Wasps Ladies (SF)	18	12	0	6	516	307	+209	11	1	60	Play-off place
5	Gloucester-Hartpury	18	8	1	9	584	470	+114	14	2	50	
6	Bristol Bears Women	18	8	1	9	450	357	+93	7	3	44	
7	Richmond Women	18	5	1	12	281	506	−225	5	1	28	
8	Darlington Mowden Park Sharks	18	4	0	14	186	707	−521	1	1	18	
9	Firwood Waterloo Ladies	18	3	0	15	202	704	−502	3	1	16	
10	Worcester Valkyries	18	2	0	16	209	719	−510	2	3	13	

Source: RFU

== Regular season ==
=== Round 1 ===
8 September 2018
12:00

(1 BP) Loughborough Lightning	22–19	Richmond Women (1 BP)
Try: Hunter (2) 9' c, 62' m Penalty try 40'; Con: Daley-McLean 9'; Pen: Daley-McLean 5'	Report	Try: Hellgren 49' m Povey 80' c Con: Chamberlain 80'

Loughborough University Stadium
Referee: Matthew Astle

8 September 2018
14:00

(1 BP) Gloucester-Hartpury	24–38	Harlequins Ladies (1 BP)
Try: Acheson (2) 6' c, 49' m Wood 27' c Smith 70' m Con: Gittings (2) 6', 27'	Report	Try: Penalty try 11'; Brown 36' m Burford 40' +1 c Edwards (2) 46' m, 65' c Butler 74' c Con: E. Scott 40' +1; Green (2) 65', 74'

Hartpury College
Referee: Richard Waller

8 September 2018
14:30

Bristol Bears Women	17–32	Wasps Ladies (1 BP)
Try: Attwood 21' m Leitch 38' m Bern 45' c Con: Reed 46'	Report	Try: Dow 16' m Crake 25' c Derk 52' c Molloy (2) 57' m, 80' m Con: Goulden (2) 26', 57'; Pen: Goulden 31'

Shaftesbury Park
Referee: Henry Lowis

8 September 2018
17:00

(1 BP) Darlington Mowden Park Sharks	27–24	Worcester Valkyries (2 BP)
Try: Morton 12' m Kerr 45' c Thomson 48; c Hobson 55'; Con: Blacklock (2) 46', 49'; Pen: Blacklock 25'	Report	Try: Bennion 17' c T. Thompson 36' m English 52' c Cox 79' m Con: Foxwell (2) 18', 53'

The Darlington Arena
Referee: David Charlton

8 September 2018
17:00

Firwood Waterloo Ladies	5–38	Saracens Women (1 BP)
Try: Perris-Redding 73' m	Report	Try: P. Cleall (2) 13' m, 17' c Galligan 27' c K. Evans 47'; B. Cleall 61' m Lingham 80' c Con: Cattell (4) 17', 27', 47', 80'

Memorial Ground
Referee: Matthew Riley

=== Round 2 ===
15 September 2018

Darlington Mowden Park Sharks	14–57	Gloucester-Hartpury (1 BP)

15 September 2018

(1 BP) Harlequins Ladies	26–26	Bristol Bears Women (1 BP)

15 September 2018

Richmond Women	12–24	Firwood Waterloo Ladies

15 September 2018

(1 BP) Saracens Women	43–7	Worcester Valkyries

15 September 2018

(1 BP) Wasps Ladies	20–40	Loughborough Lightning (1 BP)

=== Round 3 ===
22 September 2018

(1 BP) Bristol Bears Women	43–5	Gloucester-Hartpury

22 September 2018

Darlington Mowden Park Sharks	0–61	Saracens Women

22 September 2018

Firwood Waterloo Ladies	12–52	Wasps Ladies (1 BP)

22 September 2018

(1 BP) Loughborough Lightning	41–17	Harlequins Ladies

22 September 2018

Worcester Valkyries	12–43	Richmond Women (1 BP)

=== Round 4 ===
29 September 2018

(1 BP) Bristol Bears Women	41–14	Darlington Mowden Park Sharks

29 September 2018

(2 BP) Gloucester-Hartpury	40–41	Loughborough Lightning (1 BP)

29 September 2018

(1 BP) Harlequins Ladies	27–6	Firwood Waterloo Ladies

29 September 2018

Richmond Women	12–30	Saracens Women (1 BP)

29 September 2018

(1 BP) Wasps Ladies	29–10	Worcester Valkyries

=== Round 5 ===
13 October 2018

Darlington Mowden Park Sharks	15–7	Richmond Women

13 October 2018

Firwood Waterloo Ladies	10–43	Gloucester-Hartpury (1 BP)

13 October 2018

(1 BP) Loughborough Lightning	36–18	Bristol Bears Women

13 October 2018

Saracens Women	21–5	Wasps Ladies

13 October 2018

Worcester Valkyries	19–69	Harlequins Ladies (1 BP)

=== Round 6 ===
20 October 2018

Bristol Bears Women	75–13	Firwood Waterloo Ladies

20 October 2018

(1 BP) Gloucester-Hartpury	67–3	Worcester Valkyries

20 October 2018

Harlequins Ladies	20–17	Saracens Women (1 BP)

20 October 2018

(1 BP) Loughborough Lightning	59–3	Darlington Mowden Park Sharks

20 October 2018

(1 BP) Wasps Ladies	31–15	Richmond Women

=== Round 7 ===
27 October 2018

Worcester Valkyries	10–50	Bristol Bears Women

27 October 2018

Darlington Mowden Park Sharks	0–38	Wasps Ladies (1 BP)

27 October 2018

Firwood Waterloo Ladies	20–51	Loughborough Lightning (1 BP)

28 October 2018

(1 BP) Saracens Women	48–24	Gloucester-Hartpury (1 BP)

28 October 2018

Richmond Women	10–40	Harlequins Ladies

=== Round 8 ===
3 November 2018

(1 BP) Loughborough Lightning	64–12	Worcester Valkyries

3 November 2018

(1 BP) Gloucester-Hartpury	34–15	Richmond Women

3 November 2018

(1 BP) Firwood Waterloo Ladies	22–14	Darlington Mowden Park Sharks

3 November 2018

Bristol Bears Women	15–32	Saracens Women (1 BP)

4 November 2018

(1 BP) Harlequins Ladies	24–8	Wasps Ladies

=== Round 9 ===
24 November 2018

Darlington Mowden Park Sharks	10–35	Harlequins Ladies (1 BP)

24 November 2018

(1 BP) Richmond Women	24–22	Wasps Ladies (2 BP)

24 November 2018

(1 BP) Saracens Women	29–0	Loughborough Lightning

24 November 2018

(1 BP) Wasps Ladies	26–10	Gloucester-Hartpury

24 November 2018

(2 BP) Worcester Valkyries	22–23	Firwood Waterloo Ladies (1 BP)

=== Round 10 ===
1 December 2018

Worcester Valkyries	0–63	Saracens Women

1 December 2018

(1 BP) Loughborough Lightning	28–10	Wasps Ladies

9 December 2017

(1 BP) Gloucester-Hartpury	24–38	Darlington Mowden Park Sharks (1 BP)

10 December 2017

Richmond Women	5–32	Bristol Bears Women (1 BP)

6 January 2018

Worcester Valkyries	7–36	Loughborough Lightning (1 BP)

=== Round 11 ===
8 December 2018

(2 BP) Wasps Ladies	34–0	Firwood Waterloo Ladies

8 December 2018

(1 BP) Saracens Women	59–0	Darlington Mowden Park Sharks

8 December 2018

(1 BP) Harlequins Ladies	43–7	Loughborough Lightning

8 December 2018

(1 BP) Gloucester-Hartpury	53–7	Bristol Bears Women

9 December 2018

Richmond Women	21–15	Worcester Valkyries (1 BP)

=== Round 12 ===
15 December 2018

(1 BP) Saracens Women	48–0	Richmond Women

15 December 2018

(1 BP) Loughborough Lightning	29–10	Gloucester-Hartpury

15 December 2018

Firwood Waterloo Ladies	0–65	Harlequins Ladies (1 BP)

15 December 2018

Darlington Mowden Park Sharks	7–5	Bristol Bears Women (1 BP)

16 December 2018

Worcester Valkyries	5–48	Wasps Ladies (1 BP)

=== Round 13 ===
22 December 2018

Bristol Bears Women	18–14	Loughborough Lightning (1 BP)

22 December 2018

(1 BP) Gloucester-Hartpury	52–20	Firwood Waterloo Ladies (1 BP)

22 December 2018

(1 BP) Harlequins Ladies	48–5	Bristol Bears Women

22 December 2018

(1 BP) Richmond Women	29–10	Darlington Mowden Park Sharks

22 December 2018

Wasps Ladies	17–45	Saracens Women (1 BP)

=== Round 14 ===
12 January 2019

Darlington Mowden Park Sharks	14–53	Loughborough Lightning (1 BP)

12 January 2019

Firwood Waterloo Ladies	0–14	Bristol Bears Women

12 January 2019

Richmond Women	12–38	Wasps Ladies

12 January 2019

(1 BP) Saracens Women	31–28	Harlequins Ladies (2 BP)

12 January 2019

Worcester Valkyries	7–27	Gloucester-Hartpury (1 BP)

=== Round 15 ===
19 January 2019

(1 BP) Bristol Bears Women	34–5	Worcester Valkyries

19 January 2019

(2 BP) Gloucester-Hartpury	28–34	Saracens Women (1 BP)

19 January 2019

(1 BP) Harlequins Ladies	59–7	Worcester Valkyries

19 January 2019

(1 BP) Loughborough Lightning	76–8	Firwood Waterloo Ladies

19 January 2019

(1 BP) Wasps Ladies	43–12	Darlington Mowden Park Sharks

=== Round 16 ===
26 January 2019

Darlington Mowden Park Sharks	14–8	Firwood Waterloo Ladies (1 BP)

26 January 2019

Saracens Women	17–14	Bristol Bears Women (1 BP)

26 January 2019

(1 BP) Wasps Ladies	13–17	Harlequins Ladies

26 January 2019

Worcester Valkyries	0–27	Loughborough Lightning (1 BP)

27 January 2019

(1 BP) Richmond Women	26–26	Gloucester-Hartpury (1 BP)

=== Round 17 ===
23 March 2019

Bristol Bears Women	24–5	Richmond Women

23 March 2019

Firwood Waterloo Ladies	19–27	Worcester Valkyries (1 BP)

23 March 2019

(1 BP) Gloucester-Hartpury	20–47	Wasps Ladies (1 BP)

23 March 2019

(1 BP) Harlequins Ladies	76–12	Darlington Mowden Park Sharks

23 March 2019

(2 BP) Loughborough Lightning	28–31	Saracens Women (1 BP)

=== Round 18 ===
30 March 2019

(1 BP) Harlequins Laides	62–0	Gloucester-Hartpury

30 March 2019

Richmond Women	0–46	Loughborougb Lightning (1 BP)

30 March 2019

(1 BP) Saracens Women	64–0	Firwood Waterloo Ladies

30 March 2019

Wasps Ladies	25–17	Bristol Bears Women

30 March 2019

(1 BP) Worcester Valkyries	26–20	Darlington Mowden Park Sharks (1 BP)

== Playoffs ==
Semi-finals
1	Saracens Women	31
4	Wasps Ladies	13
2	Harlequins Ladies	26
3	Loughborough Lightning	10

Final
1	Saracens Women	33
2	Harlequins Ladies	17

=== Semi-finals ===
13 April 2019
15:00

Saracens Women	31–13	Wasps Ladies
Try: Rettie 13' c Clapp 17' m P. Cleall 43' c Botterman 58' m Galligan 64' c Con: Harrison (3/5) 14', 44', 65'	Report	Try: Dodd 78' c Con: Goulden (1/1) 79'; Pen: Goulden (2/2) 34', 39'

Allianz Park
Referee: Sara Cox

Team details

FB	15	(England) Sarah McKenna
RW	14	(England) Sydney Gregson	(substituted off) 73'
OC	13	(Ireland) Hannah Casey	(substituted off) 71'
IC	12	(England) Lauren Cattell
LW	11	(England) Lotte Clapp (c)
FH	10	(England) Zoe Harrison
SH	9	(England) Georgina Gulliver	(substituted off) 64'
N8	8	(England) Poppy Cleall	(substituted off) 71'
OF	7	(Wales) Christina Siczowa	(substituted off) 71'
BF	6	(Scotland) Jodie Rettie
RL	5	(England) Rosie Galligan
LL	4	(England) Sonia Green
TP	3	(England) Hannah Botterman	(substituted off) 73'
HK	2	(England) May Campbell
LP	1	(England) Ellena Perry	(substituted off) 73'
Substitutions:
HK	16	(England) Kathryn Robinson	(substituted in) 71'
PR	17	(Spain) Jeanina Loyola	(substituted in) 73'
PR	18	(England) Hannah Duffy	(substituted in) 73'
FL	19	(England) Kayleigh Searcy	(substituted in) 71'
SH	20	(England) Emma Swords	(substituted in) 64'
CE	21	(Denmark) Nina Vistisen	(substituted in) 71'
WG	22	(England) Georgie Lingham	(substituted in) 73'
Coach:
(England) Alex Austerberry

FB	15	(England) Danielle Waterman (c)
RW	14	(England) Abby Dow		(substituted off) 8'
OC	13	(Wales) Gemma Rowland
IC	12	(England) Katie Adler
LW	11	(England) Tova Derk
FH	10	(England) Lizzie Goulden
SH	9	(England) Claudia MacDonald	(yellow card) 3' to 13'	(substituted off) 69'
N8	8	(England) Sarah Mitchelson
OF	7	(Ireland) Claire Molloy
BF	6	(Ireland) Cliodhna Moloney		(substituted off) 66'
RL	5	(England) Nora Baltruweit
LL	4	(England) Emily Maisey		(substituted off) 74'
TP	3	(England) Hannah West
HK	2	(England) Amy Cokayne
LP	1	(England) Claire Cripps		(substituted off) 74'
Substitutions:
HK	16	(England) Helena Ironton
PR	17	(Ireland) Andrea Stock		(substituted in) 74'
LK	18	(England) Kasey Allen		(substituted in) 74'
FL	19	(England) Liz Crake		(substituted in) 66'
SH	20	(Ireland) Deirdre Roberts		(substituted in) 69'
CE	21	(England) Louise Dodd			(substituted in) 61'
WG	22	(England) Garnet Mackinder		(substituted in) 8'	(substituted off) 61'
Coach:
(England) Giselle Mather

14 April 2019
14:00

Harlequins Ladies	26–10	Loughborough Lightning
Try: Konkel (2) 3' m, 33' c Cornborough 51' c Riley 68' c Con: Green (3/4) 34', 52', 69'	Report	Try: Williams 5' m Davey 76' m

Twickenham Stoop
Referee: George Selwood

Team details

FB	15	(England) Emily Scott
RW	14	(England) Heather Cowell	(substituted off) 73'
OC	13	(France) Khadidja Camara	(substituted off) 73'
IC	12	(England) Rachael Burford (c)
LW	11	(England) Jess Breach
FH	10	(England) Ellie Green
SH	9	(England) Leanne Riley	(substituted off) 73'
N8	8	(Scotland) Jade Konkel	(substituted off) 77'
OF	7	(United States) Kristine Sommer
BF	6	(England) Shaunagh Brown	(substituted off) 47'
RL	5	(England) Fiona Fletcher
LL	4	(England) Abbie Scott	(substituted off) 73'
TP	3	(England) Chloe Edwards
HK	2	(England) Davinia Catlin	43' to 51'
LP	1	(England) Vickii Cornborough			(substituted off) 64'
Substitutions:
PR	16	(Sweden) Tove Viksten	(substituted in) 43'	(substituted off) 51'	(substituted in) 64'
FL	17	(Australia) Chloe Butler	(substituted in) 47'
LK	18	(Scotland) Deborah McCormack	(substituted in) 77'
LK	19	(England) Zoe Saynor	(substituted in) 73'
SH	20	(England) Lucy Packer	(substituted in) 73'
WG	21	(England) Holly Myers	(substituted in) 73'
WG	22	(England) Beth Wilcock	(substituted in) 73'
Coach:
(England) Gary Street			(Scotland) Karen Findlay

FB	15	(England) Olivia Jones		(substituted off) 54'
RW	14	(Scotland) Rhona Lloyd
OC	13	(England) Emily Scarratt		(substituted off) 22'
IC	12	(England) Ellen Ramsbottom		(substituted off) 69'
LW	11	(Wales) Carys Williams
FH	10	(England) Katy Daley-McLean (c)	(yellow card) 1' to 11'
SH	9	(Scotland) Jenny Maxwell		(substituted off) 60'
N8	8	(England) Sarah Hunter
OF	7	(England) Georgia Bradley		(substituted off) 52'
BF	6	(Scotland) Rachel Malcolm
RL	5	(Scotland) Sarah Bonar
LL	4	(England) Catherine O'Donnell
TP	3	(Canada) DaLeaka Menin		(substituted off) 77'
HK	2	(Canada) Emily Tuttosi
LP	1	(Scotland) Leah Bartlett		(substituted off) 60'
Substitutions:
PR	16	(England) Katie Trevarthen		(substituted in) 60'
PR	17	(Scotland) Mags Lowish		(substituted in) 77'
FL	18	(England) Jo Brown		(substituted in) 52'
FL	19	(England) Rebecca Noon		(substituted in) 69'
SH	20	(England) Megan Davey		(substituted in) 60'
FH	21	(England) Natasha Jones		(substituted in) 54'
FB	22	(England) Charlotte Pearce		(substituted in) 22'
Coach:
(Wales) Rhys Edwards

=== Final ===
27 April 2019
14:00

Saracens Women	33–17	Harlequins Ladies
Try: P. Cleall (2) 4' m, 27' m Gregson 9' m Harrison (2) 19' m, 39' c Con: Harrison (1/5) 40'; Pen: Harrison (2/3) 47', 79'	Report	Try: Cornborough 55' c Burford 64' c Con: E. Scott (2/2) 56', 65'; Pen: E. Scott (1/1) 43'

Franklin's Gardens
Attendance: 2,590
Referee: George Selwood

Team details

FB	15	(England) Sarah McKenna
RW	14	(England) Sydney Gregson		(substituted off) 77'
OC	13	(Ireland) Hannah Casey		(substituted off) 71'
IC	12	(England) Lauren Cattell
LW	11	(England) Lotte Clapp (c)
FH	10	(England) Zoe Harrison
SH	9	(England) Georgina Gulliver		(substituted off) 55'
N8	8	(England) Poppy Cleall
OF	7	(England) Lauren Newman		(substituted off) 65'
BF	6	(Scotland) Jodie Rettie	(yellow card) 33' to 43'
RL	5	(England) Rosie Galligan
LL	4	(England) Sonia Green
TP	3	(England) Hannah Botterman		(substituted off) 79'
HK	2	(England) May Campbell		(substituted off) 71'
LP	1	(England) Ellena Perry		(substituted off) 79'
Substitutions:
HK	16	(England) Kayleigh Searcy		(substituted in) 71'
PR	17	(Spain) Jeanina Loyola		(substituted in) 79'
PR	18	(England) Hannah Duffy		(substituted in) 79'
FL	19	(England) Sarah Bebbington		(substituted in) 65'
SH	20	(England) Emma Swords		(substituted in) 55'
CE	21	(Denmark) Nina Vistisen		(substituted in) 71'
WG	22	(England) Chantelle Miell		(substituted in) 77'
Coach:
(England) Alex Austerberry

FB	15	(England) Emily Scott
RW	14	(England) Heather Cowell
OC	13	(France) Khadidja Camara
IC	12	(England) Rachael Burford (c)
LW	11	(England) Jess Breach
FH	10	(England) Ellie Green	(substituted off) 41'
SH	9	(England) Leanne Riley
N8	8	(Scotland) Jade Konkel
OF	7	(Australia) Chloe Butler	(substituted off) 65'
BF	6	(England) Fiona Fletcher
RL	5	(Scotland) Deborah McCormack	(substituted off) 41'
LL	4	(England) Abbie Scott
TP	3	(England) Chloe Edwards
HK	2	(England) Davinia Catlin	(substituted off) 53'
LP	1	(England) Vickii Cornborough
Substitutions:
HK	16	(Ireland) Leah Lyons	(substituted in) 53'
PR	17	(Sweden) Tove Viksten	(substituted in) 41'
PR	18	(England) Samantha Voyle
LK	19	(England) Zoe Saynor	(substituted in) 65'
SH	20	(England) Lucy Packer
WG	21	(England) Holly Myers
WG	22	(England) Beth Wilcock	(substituted in) 41'
Coach:
(England) Gary Street			(Scotland) Karen Findlay

Player of the Match:
(England) Poppy Cleall (Saracens Women)
