= Sydney Gregson =

England international rugby union player

- Born: 20 January 1996 (age 30) Baldock, England
- Height: 165 cm (5 ft 5 in)
- Weight: 68 kg (10 st 10 lb)
- School: The Knights Templar School
- University: Hartpury College; University of Bath

Rugby union career
- Position(s): Centre, Wing
- Current team: Saracens Women
Senior career
Years	Team	Apps	(Points)
2015–2018	Bristol Ladies	–	(–)
2018–	Saracens Women	50+	(–)
International career
Years	Team	Apps	(Points)
2014	England U20s	8	(–)
2015–	England	7	(0)
- Correct as of 8 December 2024
National sevens teams
Years	Team		Comps
2014	England 7s U18s		
2015–17	England 7s		

Sydney Jasmine Gregson (born 20 January 1996) is an English rugby union player, who currently plays as a centre and wing for Saracens Women in Premiership Women's Rugby, the top-tier competition of women's rugby union in England, and the England national team.

== Club career ==
Gregson began her top-flight club career at Bristol Ladies, whom she played for between 2015 and 2018, alongside her studies at Hartpury College and then the University of Bath. Following a summer spent playing in Australia for the University of Sydney, Gregson then signed with reigning Premier 15s champions Saracens Women in October 2018.

Gregson made her Saracens debut at the start of the 2018–19 Premier 15s season, against former club Bristol. Gregson enjoyed a breakthrough year on the wing, helping Saracens to a first-place finish in the regular season, followed by a start in the play-off final in April 2019, as she scored a try on the way to the team's 33–17 win over rivals Harlequins Women.

Due to her commitments on the rugby sevens circuit, Gregson took a sabbatical from Saracens for 2019–20, but returned to the club ahead of the 2020–21 season. She remained a first-team regular as Saracens again finished top of the regular season table, before starting on the wing in their play-off final defeat to Harlequins in May 2021.

A serious knee injury suffered in training, including damage to her anterior cruciate ligament and medial collateral ligament, resulted in Gregson missing the entirety of the club's title-winning 2021–22 season. After undergoing surgery and a 13-month recovery, she was able to resume her career at Saracens in 2022–23, re-establishing herself as an outside centre and helping the team to another play-off berth. Subsequently, Gregson extended her contract with Saracens for the inaugural 2023–24 Premiership Women's Rugby season

== International career ==
As a teenager, Gregson represented England at age-group level in both the 15-a-side and 7-a-side game. Notable achievements included winning the European Sevens Championship in Sweden, as part of the England 7s U18s. In January 2014, she earned her first England U20s cap against France.

Gregson's first senior international appearance was as part of the England 7s team that competed in Russia in 2014. Over the following five years, she was a regular member of the England squad on the World Rugby Women's Sevens Series. This led to Gregson being awarded a full-time professional 7s contract by the RFU in 2019. However, as a consequence of the COVID-19 pandemic, the RFU cut funding to the England 7s programme in 2020, meaning that she and the rest of her teammates had their contracts cancelled.

In February 2015, at the age of just 19, Gregson made her test debut in England's opening match of the 2015 Women's Six Nations Championship against Wales. In total, she received three test caps that year, under then-acting head coach Vicky Ponsford.

After almost a decade out of the international set-up, Gregson finally earned a recall to the England senior squad from newly appointed head coach John Mitchell, ahead of the 2024 Women's Six Nations. She proceeded to gain her first cap in nine years, when she featured as a substitute in a victory over Wales in March 2024. Gregson made four appearances during the tournament, helping England to achieve their third consecutive Grand Slam.

== Personal life and education ==
Gregson grew up in Baldock, North Hertfordshire, and was educated at The Knights Templar School. She began playing rugby when she was 12 years old, joining Letchworth RUFC. At age 15, she continued her junior rugby development at Welwyn RFC, then moved to the west of England to study at Hartpury College between 2012 and 2015. While at Hartpury, she was coached by England international and 2014 Women's Rugby World Cup winner Danielle Waterman.

Gregson received a Trendell Sports Scholarship to attend the University of Bath and played for the university rugby team from 2015 to 2018. During this period, she also obtained a bachelor's degree in sports studies. Later, alongside her playing career at Saracens, she worked as a learning support assistant at the affiliated Saracens High School from 2021 to 2022. She then qualified as a teacher at Heath Mount School in Hertfordshire.
