= Georgia Brock =

English rugby union player

- Born: 19 April 2001 (age 25)
- Height: 164 cm (5 ft 5 in)
- Weight: 73 kg (161 lb; 11 st 7 lb)
- School: Hartpury College

Rugby union career
- Position: Back row
- Current team: Gloucester-Hartpury
Senior career
Years	Team	Apps	(Points)
2021–	Gloucester-Hartpury		(0)
International career
Years	Team	Apps	(Points)
2024–	England	2	(0)

Georgia Brock (born 19 April 2001) is an English rugby union player who plays for Gloucester-Hartpury and the England women's national rugby union team.

== Early life ==
Born in Beford, she started playing rugby at the age of six years-old at Olney RFC. She attended Hartpury College with whom she won the BUCS title in 2023.

== Career ==
Brock plays for Premiership Women's Rugby side Gloucester-Hartpury.

She was called up to train with the senior England side in July 2024. Brock made her debut for the England women's national rugby union team against New Zealand in September 2024. She was subsequently named in the England squad for the 2024 WXV beginning that month in Canada. She made her first start for England in the first match of the tournament and scored England's third try in a 61–21 win over USA.

On 17 March 2025, she was named in England's squad for the Women's Six Nations Championship.
