= Paige Farries =

Canadian rugby union and sevens player (born 1994)

- Born: 12 August 1994 (age 32) Red Deer, Alberta
- Height: 1.75 m (5 ft 9 in)
- Weight: 72 kg (159 lb)

Rugby union career
- Position: Wing
- Current team: Saracens
Senior career
Years	Team	Apps	(Points)
2020–2023	Worcester Warriors	39	(80)
2023–	Saracens	13	(40)
- Correct as of 2025-01-07
International career
Years	Team	Apps	(Points)
2017–present	Canada	41	(75)
- Correct as of 27 September 2025
National sevens team
Years	Team		Comps
2013	Canada		
Medal record
Women's rugby union
Representing Canada
World Cup
Silver medal – second place	2025 England	Team competition

Paige Nickerson Farries (born 12 August 1994) is a Canadian rugby union player. She currently plays as a wing for Saracens in Premiership Women's Rugby, the top-flight competition of women's rugby union in England, and for Canada at international level.

== Personal life ==
Farries is originally from Red Deer, Alberta, but now lives on Vancouver Island. She played lacrosse for several years, but stopped playing in grade 11 due to the size and the physicality of the boys. While deciding what to do next, her high school's rugby director invited her to try rugby. After giving it a go, she became instantly hooked.

== Rugby career ==
In 2020, Farries signed with Worcester Warriors in the Premier 15s.

In 2022, Farries competed for Canada at the delayed 2021 Rugby World Cup in New Zealand. She scored the first try in the opening match against Japan, again in the second pool game against Italy, and then once more in their pool game against the United States. She scored a try, yet again, against the United States in their quarterfinal match. She also played in the semi-final against England, and in the third place final against France.

In October 2023, Farries was made redundant from Worcester Warriors, prior to the start of the 2023–24 season, after the club withdrew from the league because of insufficient funds to continue operating. The following month, she joined Saracens.

Farries was named in Canada's squad for their test against the Springbok women and for the 2023 Pacific Four Series. She scored a try in her sides 66–7 victory over South Africa in Madrid, Spain. She started in her sides Pacific Four loss to the Black Ferns, they went down 21–52.

She was selected in Canada's squad for the 2025 Pacific Four Series. In July, she made the selection into Canada's Rugby World Cup squad.
