= Bo Westcombe-Evans =

English rugby union player

- Born: 19 June 2002 (age 24)
- University: Loughborough University

Rugby union career
- Position: Winger
- Current team: Loughborough Lightning
Senior career
Years	Team	Apps	(Points)
2021-	Loughborough Lightning		
International career
Years	Team	Apps	(Points)
2024-	England	2	(5)
- Correct as of 13 October 2024

Boudica Willow Westcombe-Evans (born 18 August 2002) is an English rugby union player who plays as a winger for Loughborough Lightning and the England women's national rugby union team.

== Early life ==
From St Albans, she started playing rugby union at her hometown club Old Albanians and was also part of the Saracens Centre of Excellence.

== Club career ==
She made her debut for Loughborough Lightning in Premiership Women's Rugby at the age of 19 years-old.

She made the most metres (1,700) and the most line breaks (25) of all the players in the Premiership Women's Rugby during the 2023-24 regular season. Despite missing a year of action with an ACL knee injury, she made her fiftieth appearance for Loughborough Lightning in the PWR on 29 November 2025 against Leicester Tigers, scoring four tries in a 38-10 victory.

== International career ==
She was named in the England women's national rugby union team squad for the 2024 WXV in Canada in September 2024. She made a try scoring debut for England in a 61-21 win over USA on 29 September 2024.

== Style of play ==
Known for her pace, ahead of her England debut, England attacking coach Lou Meadows praised her ability to break past defences on the outside.

== Personal life ==
She studied Sports Management at Loughborough University.
