= Georgie Perris-Redding =

US international rugby union player (born 1997)

- Born: January 10, 1997 (age 29) Detroit, Michigan, United States
- Height: 160 cm (5 ft 3 in)
- Weight: 68 kg (150 lb)

Rugby union career
- Position: Flanker
Senior career
Years	Team	Apps	(Points)
2020–	Sale Sharks	75	(100)
International career
Years	Team	Apps	(Points)
2022–	United States	18	(20)

Georgie Lilly Perris-Redding (born January 10, 1997) is an American rugby union player. She plays as a flanker for the United States internationally and for Sale Sharks in the Premier 15s. Perris-Redding is best known for scoring the quickest try in Professional Women's Rugby.

== Rugby career ==
Perris-Redding signed with Sale Sharks in 2020 with her twin sister India. She featured for the USA Falcons in their 31–23 victory over Wales in Llanelli in 2022.

Perris-Redding was named in the United States squad to the 2022 Pacific Four Series in New Zealand. She was named in the starting line-up when she debuted for the Eagles against Canada at the Series. She later earned her second test cap off the bench against the Black Ferns.

In August 2022, Perris-Redding played in a warm-up match against Scotland. She also played in the warm-up game against England at Sandy Park. She was later selected in the Eagles squad for the delayed 2021 Rugby World Cup in New Zealand.

Perris-Redding was named in the Eagles traveling squad for their test against Spain, and for the 2023 Pacific Four Series. She was in the starting line-up when her side beat Spain 20–14.

On July 17, 2025, she was selected for the Eagles side to the Women's Rugby World Cup that will be held in England.
