= Pip Hendy =

English rugby union player (born 2003)

- Born: 5 May 2003 (age 23) Bath, England
- Height: 1.74 m (5 ft 9 in)
- Weight: 71 kg (157 lb)
- University: Hartpury University

Rugby union career
- Position: Wing
- Current team: Gloucester-Hartpury
Senior career
| Years | Team | Apps | (Points) |
| 2022– | Gloucester-Hartpury | | |

Pip Hendy (born 5 May 2003) is an English rugby union footballer who plays as a winger for Premiership Women's Rugby club Gloucester-Hartpury.

== Early and personal life ==
Born in Bath, Somerset, she grew up on a cattle farm and combines her rugby career with working on the farm.

== Career ==
She joined the Gloucester-Hartpury young talent pathway at the age of 16 years-old, and made her debut for the club at the age of 18 years-old. She had to be patient for further first team chances, but was a member of Hartpury University's Women's National League championship-winning teams in 2022 and 2023, part of the British Universities and Colleges Sport (BUCS) rugby competitions.

Hendy impressed with her performances in the PWR UP series and she was moved to the starting place in the first-XV of Gloucester-Hartpury during the 2023-2024 season, and helped the team to the Premiership Women's Rugby title; scoring a try in a 36-20 win against Bristol Bears Women in the Premiership final, in June 2024.

She started the final again the following year as Gloucester-Hartpury retained their title with a 34-19 win over Saracens Women in March 2025.
