= Liz Crake =

England international rugby union player

- Born: Elizabeth Crake; 8 November 1994 (age 32) Bishop's Stortford, England
- School: Hockerill Anglo-European College
- University: King's College London

Rugby union career
- Position(s): Prop, Flanker, Number 8
- Current team: Saracens Women
Senior career
Years	Team	Apps	(Points)
2014–present	Wasps		
International career
Years	Team	Apps	(Points)
2023–present	England	2	

Elizabeth Crake (born 8 November 1994) is an English rugby union player who currently plays as a loose-head prop for Saracens in the Premier 15s and for the England national team.

== Early life and education ==
Crake attended Hockerill Anglo-European College and later studied at King's College London from 2013 to 2018, earning a BDS in Dentistry. She has continued to pursue a career as a dentist alongside her rugby career.

== Rugby career ==
=== Club career ===
Crake joined Wasps in 2014 during her first year of university. She initially played in various back row positions before moving to prop.

Crake signed with Saracens ahead of the 2025-26 season, joining from Ealing Trailfinders.

=== International career ===
Crake was selected in the England squad for the Six Nations in 2023 and made her debut as a replacement against Scotland.
