= Bethan Lewis =

Welsh international rugby union player

- Born: 19 February 1999 (age 27) Carmarthen, Wales
- Height: 168 cm (5 ft 6 in)
- Weight: 76 kg (168 lb)

Rugby union career
- Position: Flanker
- Current team: Gloucester-Hartpury
Amateur team(s)
Years	Team	Apps	(Points)
–	Carmarthen Quins	–	(–)
–	Carmarthen Athletic RFC	–	(–)
–	Hartpury University	–	(–)
Senior career
Years	Team	Apps	(Points)
2018–2026	Gloucester-Hartpury		
2026–	Bristol Bears Women		
International career
Years	Team	Apps	(Points)
2018–	Wales	61	(30)
- Correct as of 24 September 2025
National sevens team
Years	Team		Comps
2018–	Wales		

Bethan Lewis (born 19 February 1999) is a professional Welsh rugby union player who plays flanker for the Wales women's national rugby union team and Bristol Bears Women in Premiership Women's Rugby.

== Early life and education ==
Lewis, who was born and bred in Abergwili, Carmarthen. She attended Ysgol Nantgaredig and then Ysgol Bro Myrddin. She started playing for Carmarthen Quins as a six year old. She participated in athletics, tennis, football, and table tennis as a youngster. She also represented Great Britain at the world junior surf championships.

== Club career ==
She joined Gloucester-Hartpury in 2018 and studied Sports and Exercise Science at Hartpury University.

She was named as Gloucester-Hartpury's captain for their 2019–2020 Premier 15s season. She re-signed with Gloucester-Hartpury to remain with the club in April 2024.

In June 2026, Lewis announced her departure from Gloucester-Hartpury to join Bristol Bears Women.

== International career ==
Lewis made her international debut for Wales against Scotland in 2018.

In 2024, she was selected in Wales squad for their Six Nations campaign. She featured for the Welsh side at the WXV 2 tournament that was held in Cape Town, South Africa.

She was named in the side for the 2025 Six Nations Championship in March. On 11 August 2025, she was selected in the Welsh squad to the Women's Rugby World Cup in England.
