= Emily Tuttosi =

Canadian rugby union player

- Born: 21 September 1995 (age 31) Souris, Manitoba
- Height: 1.74 m (5 ft 9 in)
- Weight: 86 kg (190 lb)

Rugby union career
- Position: Hooker
- Current team: Exeter Chiefs
Senior career
Years	Team	Apps	(Points)
2018–2019	Loughborough Lightning	0	(0)
2020–Present	Exeter Chiefs	53	(85)
International career
Years	Team	Apps	(Points)
2018–	Canada	41	(75)

Emily Kristyn Tuttosi (born 21 September 1995) is a Canadian rugby union player. She plays as hooker for Canada internationally and for the Exeter Chiefs in the Premier 15s. She competed for Canada at the delayed 2021 Rugby World Cup.

== Rugby career ==
Tuttosi is from Souris, Manitoba in Canada. She made her international debut for Canada against England in 2018. She joined Exeter Chiefs in 2020. She previously played for Loughborough Lightning in the 2018–19 Premier 15s season.

In 2022, she was named in the Canadian squad for the delayed 2021 Rugby World Cup in New Zealand. She scored a hat-trick against Japan in Canada's first game of the tournament. She later scored two tries against Italy in their second game.

Tuttosi was named in Canada's squad for their test against the Springbok women and for the 2023 Pacific Four Series. She started in Canada's 66–7 thrashing of South Africa in Madrid, Spain. In July 2023, she started in her sides Pacific Four loss to the Black Ferns, they went down 21–52.

She was selected in Canada's squad for the 2025 Pacific Four Series. Later that year, she was named in the side to the Rugby World Cup in England.

== Honours ==
Canada

- Women's Rugby World Cup
  - (silver) 2025
