= Elis Martin =

Scotland international rugby union player

- Born: 23 May 1999 (age 27) Glasgow, Scotland
- Height: 165 cm (5 ft 5 in)
- Weight: 82 kg (181 lb; 12 st 13 lb)

Rugby union career
- Position: Hooker
Senior career
Years	Team	Apps	(Points)
2022	Sale Sharks	2	(0)
2023	DMP Sharks	9	(0)
2023–2024	Leicester Tigers	14	(15)
2024–	Loughborough Lightning	13	(5)
International career
Years	Team	Apps	(Points)
2022–	Scotland	26	(25)

Elis Martin (born 23 May 1999) is a Scottish rugby union player. She competed for Scotland at the 2025 Women's Rugby World Cup.

== Early career ==
Martin is originally from Glasgow and started her rugby career at Hillhead Jordanhill Under 18's before she moved across to Edinburgh. She progressed through the age groups at International level, and featured for the Under-20's team before moving up to the Senior Squad.

== Rugby career ==
Martin made her international debut for Scotland against the United States in August 2022. She previously played for Sale Sharks and DMP Sharks.

In 2023, she joined Leicester Tigers. Later in October, she won the first edition of the WXV 2 tournament with the Scottish team in Cape Town.

Martin joined Loughborough Lightning in 2024 after a season with Leicester Tigers.

She was selected in the Scottish side for the 2025 Women's Rugby World Cup in England. She started against Fiji in Scotland's second World Cup match.

== Personal life ==
Martin was completing her master's degree in Strength and Conditioning at the University of Edinburgh in 2023.
