= Deborah Wills =

English rugby sevens player

- Full name: Deborah Wills
- Born: 10 June 1991 (age 35)
- Height: 1.72 m (5 ft 8 in)
- Weight: 60 kg (132 lb)

Rugby union career
Senior career
Years	Team	Apps	(Points)
- Bristol Bears
- Saracens
National sevens team
Years	Team		Comps
2017-	England 7s		
Medal record
Commonwealth Games
Bronze medal – third place	2018 Gold Coast	Team

Deborah Wills (née Fleming, born 10 June 1991) is an English rugby sevens player.

Fleming began playing for Bristol Bears when she was 21 before moving to Saracens. She joined the England women's national rugby sevens team in 2017.

She won a bronze medal at the 2018 Commonwealth Games.
