= Ellie Green =

English rugby union player

- Born: Eleanor Xanthippe Green; 21 January 2001 (age 25) Epsom, Surrey, England
- Height: 1.68 m (5 ft 6 in)
- Weight: 69 kg (10 st 12 lb)

Rugby union career
- Position: Fly-half
- Current team: Gloucester-Hartpury
Senior career
Years	Team	Apps	(Points)
2017–2023	Harlequins	82	(491)
2023	Worcester Warriors	3	(31)
2023 - 2024	Ealing Trailfinders Women	17	(106)
2024 - 2026	Gloucester-Hartpury	13	(10)

Ellie Green (born 21 January 2001, Epsom) is an English rugby union player. She currently plays for Gloucester-Hartpury at club level and was a member of England's 2021 Women's Six Nations squad.

== International career ==
Ellie represented England U18's against Wales U18's at the Principality Stadium in April 2018. Ellie was a consistent member of the England U20s team, selected for the 2018 tour to Canada in Summer 2018 and was called up to the senior side as part of the England squad for the 2021 Women's Six Nations Championships.

== Club career ==
Green joined Harlequins during the 2017/18 season.

For the 2018/19 Tyrrells Premier 15s season, Ellie was named Young Player of the Season by Telegraph Sport and was the top points scorer (126) which included three from a drop goal. In 2020/21 she kicked a second drop goal and was second top points scorer (106).

Ellie joined Worcester Warriors for the 2023/24 season until they were forced to withdraw from the league due to funding issues in October 2023, when she signed for Trailfinders Women.

For the 2024/25 season Green joined Gloucester-Hartpury.

Ellie played in thee Premier 15’s finals 2017/18, 2018/19, 2020/21 for Harlequins and one for Gloucester-Hartpury in 2024/25 and was in the winning team with both clubs (2020/21 and 2024/25).

== Early life and education ==
Ellie has played rugby from a very young age, she started playing at Sutton and Epsom RFC and then went on to play for Beccehamians RFC. She also played for Surrey U15's and U18's teams. Ellie also swam competitively for Epsom District Swimming Club.

Ellie played hockey, netball, Rugby 7's and was part of the swim team while at Reigate Grammar School and studied Maths, Biology and PE at A Level. She went on to study for a degree in Sport and Exercise Science at the University of Surrey.
