= Worcester Warriors Women =

Disbanded women's Rugby union team

- Full name: Worcester Warriors Women
- Union: RFUW
- Founded: 1993
- Disbanded: 2023
- Ground(s): Sixways Stadium, Worcester
- Director of Rugby: (England) Jo Yapp
- Captain: (Scotland) Lyndsay O'Donnell
- League: Premier 15s
- 2021–22: 8th
1st kit	2nd kit

Official website
- www.warriorswomen.co.uk
- Current season

Worcester Warriors Women, formerly known as Worcester Valkyries, were a women's rugby union club in Worcester, Worcestershire, England. They were founded in 1993, as Worcester Ladies, and play in the Premier 15s. They were originally created as the women's team of Worcester Wanderers, but became part of the English Premiership team Worcester Warriors' organisation ahead of the 2016/17 season. They subsequently became an independent entity during the 2022–23 season on the demise of their parent company.

== History ==
Worcester Ladies were formed in 1993 by Mark Edwards, who also set up women's rugby union teams at Droitwich RFC and Malvern RFC. They initially played in the national leagues. In 1998, they were promoted into the Women's Premiership for the first time. Worcester Ladies has close links with the University of Worcester with some players playing for both Worcester Ladies and the University of Worcester's women's rugby union team. In 2013, Worcester Ladies won their first Women's Premiership title after a bonus-point victory against Wasps Ladies to stop Richmond Women winning a fourth consecutive title.

Worcester Ladies have a local rivalry with Lichfield Ladies. Being affiliated to Worcester Warriors, Worcester Ladies play their home matches at Worcester Warriors' Sixways Stadium.

In August 2022, Warriors Women and the University of Worcester agreed a multi-year landmark deal which would see the team renamed University of Worcester Warriors.

Due to ongoing financial difficulties experienced in 2022. Worcester Warriors Women were suspended from all competitions on 26 September 2022 and the company was placed into administration.

The suspension was temporarily lifted on 26 October when it was confirmed that University of Worcester Warriors had received funding and insurance to compete until Christmas 2022.

In October 2023, Worcester withdrew from the 2023–24 Premiership Women's Rugby league and cup competitions. This decision was made after the club's owners, Cube International, chose to cut the team's funding.

== Notable players ==
Worcester Ladies have had a number of internationals play for them. Joanne Yapp, Samantha Dale, and Kat Merchant both played for the England women's national rugby union team. Former England women's captain, Catherine Spencer also played for Worcester. Donna Kennedy played for both Worcester and the Scotland women's national rugby union team, whom she earned 100 caps for. The current squad includes England internationals Lydia Thompson (rugby union), Laura Keates and Canadian international Paige Farries

== Coaching ==
In 2010, Worcester Ladies hired former Jersey player, Luke Fisher as their head coach.

In June 2017, the Valkyries appointed former Bristol Ladies Head Coach Roy Davies as Director of Rugby

In October 2019, former England captain Jo Yapp took over as director of rugby
