= Beth Wilcock =

English rugby union player

- Born: 3 January 2001 (age 25)
- Height: 165 cm (5 ft 5 in)
- Weight: 70 kg (154 lb)

Rugby union career
- Position: Wing
- Current team: Harlequins Women
Senior career
Years	Team	Apps	(Points)
2019–	Harlequins		
International career
Years	Team	Apps	(Points)
2018–	England U20s		
National sevens team
Years	Team		Comps
2019	England		

Bethany Wilcock (born 3 January 2001) is an English rugby union player. She plays for Harlequins Women and is a member of England's 2021 Women's Six Nations Championship squad.

== International career ==
Wilcock first played for the England Sevens squad for the 2019/20 season. Her first appearance was at the World Series in Biarritz.

She went on to play 15s for the England U20s in 2018 and was invited to join the senior team as a development player for the 2021 Women's Six Nations Championship.

== Club career ==
Wilcock plays for Harlequins Women as a fullback, having joined the side in 2019.
