= Ellena Perry =

England & Ireland international rugby union player

- Born: 12 April 1997 (age 29) Welwyn Garden City, England
- Height: 1.65 m (5 ft 5 in)
- Weight: 82 kg (181 lb; 12 st 13 lb)

Rugby union career
- Position: Prop
- Current team: Gloucester-Hartpury
Senior career
Years	Team	Apps	(Points)
2015–2019	Saracens		
2019–	Gloucester-Hartpury		
International career
Years	Team	Apps	(Points)
2018–2020	England	11	(0)
2025–	Ireland	4	(0)
- Correct as of 14 September 2025

Ellena Lucy Perry (born 12 April 1997, Welwyn Garden City) is an English born rugby union player. She represented England women's national rugby union team internationally from 2018 to 2020, however after waiting 5 years from her final England appearance she switched allegiance to qualify for Ireland. She plays for Gloucester-Hartpury domestically in England.

== Early and personal life ==
Perry was born in Welwyn Garden City in 1997. Her mother Jan and father Paul used to take her to play at Hertford RFC from the age of 6. Perry attended The John Warner School and won the School Games in 2015 with the south east sevens rugby team.

She completed A-levels in physical education, psychology, business studies and biology at Hartpury College before studying sports science at the University of Coventry.

== Club career ==
Perry made her Saracens Women debut in 2015, a week after tuning 18 and was still 18 when she played in the 2016 Premiership final for Saracens. In 2019 Perry switched to Gloucester-Hartpury, just before the start of the 2019-20 Premier 15s season.

== International career ==
Perry made her England debut as a loose head prop in 2018, during the 2018 Quilter Internationals. She played in all three games.

In December 2020, she was called up to the England squad to play against France, a game that England won 25–23. She missed several fixtures in 2019-2020 due to injury.

In 2021 she was named an invitational player for England in the 2021 Women's Six Nations Championship.

In August 2025 she was named on the Irish team to face Canada, being eligible to switch nations after last having played for England in November 2020 and qualifying for Ireland through her maternal grandfather. On 11 August 2025, she was named in the 2025 Women's Rugby World Cup squad by head coach Scott Bemand. She continued with Ireland for their 2026 Six Nations Championship campaign.
