= Premiership Women's Rugby =

Women's rugby union club competition in England

- Upcoming season or competition: 2026–27 Premiership Women's Rugby
- Sport: Rugby union
- Founded: 2017; 9 years ago
- First season: 2017–18
- CEO: Genevieve Shore
- Administrator: RFU
- No. of teams: 9
- Country: England
- Most recent champion: Saracens (2025–26)
- Most titles: Saracens (4 titles)
- Broadcaster: TNT Sports
- Level on pyramid: Level 1
- Relegation to: No relegation
- Domestic cup: PWR Cup
- Website: www.thepwr.com

Premiership Women's Rugby, commonly known as The PWR, and officially known as the JAECOO PWR for sponsorship reasons, is an annual semi-professional women's rugby union club competition at the highest level of the English rugby union system, and is run by the Rugby Football Union (RFU). It is contested by nine clubs, who play two series of round-robin matches to determine the four participants of the play-offs, which takes the form of a single-elimination tournament. It began play in the 2017–18 season, superseding the former Women's Premiership, and introducing elements of professionalism in the sport's highest level. In its first six seasons, the competition was known as the Premier 15s. The current PWR champions are Saracens, who have also won the most league titles in total (4).

Premiership Women's Rugby runs concurrently with the PWR Cup, a similar annual competition contested by the same clubs, which was introduced in the 2021–22 season. Unlike the league format, teams are instead split into two pools, and only play one series of round-robin matches to determine places in the competition's play-offs. Saracens are the current cup champions, while they and Exeter Chiefs have won the most cups (2).

== History ==
=== 2016–2023: Premier 15s ===
The RFU founded the competition as 'Women's Super Rugby' in October 2016, committing to a three-year, £2.4 million investment. A bidding process was opened to clubs seeking to operate a franchise in the new league, with the RFU initially planning to have all eight Women's Premiership teams and two new teams compete. Minimum standards were raised for aspiring franchise owners, such as requiring clubs to invest in professional training facilities and coaching resources.

After interviews with twelve clubs at Twickenham Stadium, the RFU announced the league's ten foundation clubs in February 2017. The decision to admit all Premiership clubs (Aylesford Bulls Ladies being taken over by Harlequins to become Harlequins Ladies) except for Lichfield Ladies, despite their fifteen-year presence in the top flight, was controversial. As the club expressed being "disgusted, disappointed and dumbfounded", Leicester Tigers, and Member for Lichfield Michael Fabricant, unsuccessfully attempted to overturn the decision, with the latter claiming the selection of only ten teams violated the Equality Act 2010, as the men's Premiership Rugby had twelve teams. The Thurrock T-Birds, who won the 2016–17 Championship 1 South season, also unsuccessfully attempted to appeal their exclusion.

The seven Premiership clubs would join Gloucester–Hartpury, Loughborough Lightning, and Waterloo in the inaugural season of the league, which had been rebranded to the 'Premier 15s' prior to its start. Potato crisps manufacturer Tyrrells obtained its naming rights for three years, in what was described by the RFU as "the biggest ever financial investment in women's club rugby."

Financial services company Allianz began their naming rights sponsorship ahead of the 2020–21 season. The two independent clubs, Richmond and Waterloo, were replaced with the Premiership Rugby-affiliated Exeter Chiefs and Sale Sharks. The RFU stressed the need for financially viable clubs in the wake of the COVID-19 pandemic. Worcester Warriors were temporarily suspended during the 2022–23 season due to financial difficulties. These were resolved within a month and Worcester were unsuspended.

=== 2023 onwards: Premiership Women's Rugby ===
Trailfinders and Leicester Tigers were admitted into the league in the 2023–24 season, as the competition rebranded to 'Premiership Women's Rugby'. Sale Sharks and Worcester Warriors were initially excluded from the 2023–24 season alongside DMP Sharks and Wasps. Sale and Worcester were given conditional invitations by the RFU to rejoin for the 2023–24 season, in order to maintain the number of clubs in the league at ten.

On 17 October 2023, the owners of Worcester Warriors Women, Cube International, notified the RFU and PWR that they intended to withdraw Worcester Warriors Women from Premiership Women's Rugby and the Allianz Cup. The impact on the season's fixtures was not announced, however Worcester's next fixture, the Allianz Cup match against Bristol Bears Women was cancelled.

On 27 February 2026, the RFU Council approved a major restructuring of the men's top flight of rugby in England. As part of the joint announcement, made by the RFU, PREM Rugby, Champ Rugby, Premiership Women's Rugby and the Rugby Players' Association, all PREM clubs will be required to either operate a Premiership Women's Rugby team or fund a regional women's development plan, with financial penalties for non-compliance.

On 31 March 2026, Premiership Women's Rugby opened an expressions of interest process to explore potential league expansion. PWR said the process was exploratory rather than a formal application stage, and that it was designed to assess the readiness of possible future entrants and inform plans for the league's future competition structure. Clubs across the UK and Ireland were invited to register interest by 30 April 2026. PWR said any prospective entrant must be able to invest at least £1.2 million annually in its rugby programme, field a squad of 45 to 55 players, and meet competition, broadcast and training standards. Following the opening of the expressions of interest process, the Welsh Rugby Union (WRU) announced its intention to submit an expression of interest in entering a team in the PWR. Wales head coach Sean Lynn, who won three PWR titles with Gloucester–Hartpury, confirmed the WRU would participate in the process.

On 25 June 2026, the PWR announced a multi-year title partnership with Jaecoo, marking the first time the league had secured a paying title sponsor. The three-year deal, worth more than £3 million in total with over £1 million invested per season, saw the competition rebranded as the JAECOO PWR from the 2026–27 season, while the league's pre-season tournament, the PWR Cup was renamed the JAECOO PWR Next Gen Cup.

== Teams ==
Nine teams are currently competing in Premiership Women's Rugby, as of the 2026–27 season.

Premiership Women's Rugby (England)
Locations of teams in Premiership Women's Rugby and the PWR Cup
Locations of clubs in Greater London

Current teams
Team	Established	Location	Stadium	Capacity	Titles (last)	Ref
Bristol Bears	1984; 42 years ago	Bristol	Ashton Gate	27,000	– (N/A)	
Bristol Bears	1984; 42 years ago	Bristol	Shaftesbury Park	200	– (N/A)	
Exeter Chiefs	2019; 7 years ago	Exeter	Sandy Park	15,600	– (N/A)	
Gloucester–Hartpury	2014; 12 years ago	Gloucester	Kingsholm	16,115	3 (2025)	
Gloucester–Hartpury	2014; 12 years ago	Hartpury	Hartpury Stadium	2,000	3 (2025)	
Harlequins	1995; 31 years ago (Note: Re-formed in 2017)	Twickenham (London)	Twickenham Stoop	14,800	1 (2021)	
Leicester Tigers	2021; 5 years ago	Leicester	Welford Road	25,849	– (N/A)	
Loughborough Lightning	1970s; 55 years ago	Northampton	Franklin's Gardens	14,249	– (N/A)	
Sale Sharks	2020; 6 years ago	Sale (Manchester)	Heywood Road	3,387	– (N/A)	
Saracens	1989; 37 years ago	Hendon (London)	StoneX Stadium	10,500	4 (2026)	
Trailfinders	2023; 3 years ago	Ealing (London)	Trailfinders Sports Ground	5,000	– (N/A)	

=== All time ===
A total of 14 clubs have been involved in the top flight since the league's inception in the 2017–18 season. The most recent clubs to make debuts in Premiership Woman's Rugby were Trailfinders and Leicester Tigers, who made their top-flight debut in the 2023–24 season.

Five clubs — Bristol Bears, Gloucester–Hartpury, Harlequins, Loughborough Lightning and Saracens — have appeared in every season to date.

Below is a list of clubs that have participated in the competition and the number of full seasons they have competed in. Clubs currently active are marked in bold, while those that have been ever-present in are listed in bold italics. The last column shows the seasons each club has participated in, including the current one.

Note: The 2019–20 season is not counted as it was abandoned due to the COVID-19 pandemic.

Team	Seasons Competed	Seasons Participated
**Bristol Bears**	**8**	2017–18 to 2025–26
Darlington Mowden Park Sharks	5	2017–18 to 2022–23
**Exeter Chiefs**	**6**	2020–21 to 2025–26
**Gloucester–Hartpury**	**8**	2017–18 to 2025–26
**Harlequins**	**8**	2017–18 to 2025–26
**Leicester Tigers**	**3**	2023–24 to 2025–26
**Loughborough Lightning**	**8**	2017–18 to 2025–26
Richmond	2	2017–18 to 2018–19
**Sale Sharks**	**6**	2020–21 to 2025–26
**Saracens**	**8**	2017–18 to 2025–26
**Trailfinders**	**3**	2023–24 to 2025–26
Wasps	5	2017–18 to 2022–23
Waterloo	2	2017–18 to 2018–19
Worcester Warriors	5	2017–18 to 2022–23

== Sponsorship ==
Period	Sponsor	Name	League Branding	Ref
2017–2020	(United Kingdom) Tyrrells Potato Crisps	Tyrrells Premier 15s	Premier 15s	
2020–2023	(Germany) Allianz	Allianz Premier 15s	Premier 15s	
2023–2024	(Germany) Allianz	Allianz Premiership Women's Rugby	Premiership Women's Rugby	
2024–2026	No sponsor	Premiership Women's Rugby		—
2026–present	(China) Jaecoo	JAECOO PWR	Premiership Women's Rugby	

== Structure ==
=== League season ===
The Premiership Women's Rugby league season typically runs from September to June and comprises 18 rounds of matches, with each club playing each other home and away. From the 2023–24 season onwards, each club also has bye weeks. The results of the matches contribute points to the league as follows:

- 4 points are awarded for a win.
- 2 points are awarded for a draw.
- 0 points are awarded for a loss.
  - 1 losing (bonus) point is awarded to a team that loses a match by 7 points or fewer.
  - 1 additional (bonus) point is awarded to a team scoring 4 tries or more in a match.

=== Play-offs ===
Following the completion of the regular season, the top 4 teams enter the play-offs, which are usually held in June. The top two teams receive home advantage, the league leaders hosting the 4th ranked team, and the 2nd place team hosting the 3rd place team. The winners of these semi-finals progress to the final, with no set venue, with the winner of the final being crowned champions. In the inaugural season, the play-offs comprised back-to-back home and away fixtures, with the winner being determined by an aggregate score. This was changed to single matches from the following season onwards.

== Champions ==
Season	(gold) Champions	Final	Runners–up (silver)	Top of Table	Ref
2017–18	Saracens	24–20	Harlequins	Saracens	
2018–19	Saracens	33–17	Harlequins	Saracens	
2019–20	Season abandoned due to the COVID-19 pandemic				
2020–21	Harlequins	25–17	Saracens	Saracens	
2021–22	Saracens	43–21	Exeter Chiefs	Saracens	
2022–23	Gloucester–Hartpury	34–19	Exeter Chiefs	Gloucester–Hartpury	
2023–24	Gloucester–Hartpury	36–24	Bristol Bears	Gloucester–Hartpury	
2024–25	Gloucester–Hartpury	34–19	Saracens	Gloucester–Hartpury	
2025–26	Saracens	52–14	Trailfinders	Gloucester–Hartpury	

=== Summary of winners ===
#	Team	Champions	Years as champions	Runners–up	Years as runners–up	Top of league table
1	Saracens	4	2017–18, 2018–19, 2021–22, 2025–26	2	2020–21, 2024–25	4
2	Gloucester–Hartpury	3	2022–23, 2023–24, 2024–25	0	—	4
3	Harlequins	1	2020–21	2	2017–18, 2018–19	—

== Player records ==
All player records are from the 2017–18 season onwards, following the launch of the Premier 15s competition (which was later re-branded as Premiership Women's Rugby).

As of 17 March 2025

=== Points ===
Rank	Nationality	Player	Club(s)	Years	Points
1	England	Zoe Harrison	Saracens	2017–	676
2	England	Emma Sing	Gloucester–Hartpury	2018–	655
3	England	Ellie Green	Harlequins, Worcester, Trailfinders, Gloucester–Hartpury	2017–	498
4	England	Lark Atkin-Davies	Worcester, Loughborough, Bristol	2017–	475
5	England	Ellie Rugman	Gloucester–Hartpury	2018–	469
6	England	Poppy Cleall	Saracens	2017–	445
7	England	Marlie Packer	Saracens	2017–	430
8	England	Abby Dow	Wasps, Harlequins, Trailfinders	2017–2025	418
9	England	Helena Rowland	Saracens, Loughborough	2017–	359
10	England	Jess Breach	Harlequins, Saracens	2017–	390
10	England	May Campbell	Saracens	2017–	390

=== Tries ===
Rank	Nationality	Player	Club(s)	Years	Tries
1	England	Lark Atkin-Davies	Worcester, Loughborough, Bristol	2017–	95
2	England	Poppy Cleall	Saracens	2017–	89
3	England	Marlie Packer	Saracens	2017–	86
4	England	Ellie Rugman	Gloucester–Hartpury	2018–	81
5	England	Abby Dow	Wasps, Harlequins, Trailfinders	2017–2025	80
6	England	Jess Breach	Harlequins, Saracens	2017–	78
6	England	May Campbell	Saracens	2017–	78
8	England	Claudia Moloney-MacDonald	DMP Sharks, Wasps, Exeter	2017–	62
9	England	Ellie Kildunne	Gloucester–Hartpury, Wasps, Harlequins	2017–	59
9	England	Kelly Taylor	Gloucester–Hartpury	2017–	59

=== Goal kicking ===
Rank	Nationality	Player	Club(s)	Years	Points
1	England	Zoe Harrison	Saracens	2017–	531
2	England	Ellie Green	Harlequins, Worcester, Trailfinders, Gloucester–Hartpury	2017–	473
3	England	Emma Sing	Gloucester–Hartpury	2018–	470
4	England	Amber Reed	Bristol	2017–2025	341
5	United States	Gabby Cantorna	Exeter	2020–	304
6	England	Lagi Tuima	Bristol, Harlequins	2017–	292
7	England	Helena Rowland	Saracens, Loughborough	2017–	272
8	England	Katy Daley-McLean	Loughborough, Sale	2017–2021	208
9	England	Emily Scarratt	Loughborough	2017–2025	207
10	New Zealand	Liv McGoverne	Exeter	2022–	203

=== Awards ===
Player of the Season
Season	Nationality	Player	Club	Ref
2023–24	England	Megan Jones	Leicester	
2024–25	England	Megan Jones (2)	Leicester	
2025–26	Canada	Olivia Apps	Saracens	

Breakthrough Player of the Season
Season	Nationality	Player	Club	Ref
2023–24	England	Steph Else	Gloucester–Hartpury	
2024–25	England	Millie David	Bristol	
2025–26	England	Haineala Lutui	Loughborough	

== Broadcast ==
In the 2022–23 season, at least two matches per round were streamed on the competition website. At least one of these matches will also be shown on the BBC iPlayer and BBC Red Button. Both semi-finals and the final were shown on the competition website, BBC iPlayer, and the BBC Red Button. As part of Harlequins Big Game double-header with Harlequins Men, TNT Sports broadcast one regular season game as well as both semi-finals and the final. Unlike the BBC, TNT Sports uses its own punditry and commentary for the matches they broadcast.

From the 2023–24 season, TNT Sports gained broadcasting rights to one game per weekend as well as both the semi-finals and the final. As part of the deal, there is provision for a free-to-air provider to show both the semi-finals and final. The competition CEO Belinda Moore revealed that discussions to try to gain a terrestrial broadcaster for the competition were ongoing. The same game shown by TNT sports will be aired by The Rugby Network in the United States and Canada and by RugbyPassTV outside of the UK, Ireland, US, and Canada. BBC Sport and BBC iPlayer showing select games throughout the season.

From the 2025–26 season, TNT Sports will continue to air one game per round, as well as both semi-finals and the final. BBC Sport will show one of the other three games per round, along with one semi-final and the final, which will be available on the BBC Sport app and BBC iPlayer. The remaining two games of each round will be broadcast on the official Premiership Women's Rugby YouTube channel. This will mark the first time in the competition's history that every single league match is broadcast live.

Territory	Rights holder	Ref
United Kingdom	BBC Sport / BBC iPlayer (Note: One match per round as well as one semi-final and the final)	
United Kingdom; Ireland	TNT Sports / HBO Max, (Note: One match per round as well as both semi-finals and the final) & YouTube (Note: Two matches per round that are not shown on BBC or TNT.)	
Worldwide	YouTube	
