= 2025–26 Premiership Women's Rugby =

Season in English women's rugby union

- Countries: England
- Number of teams: 9
- Date: 24 October 2025 – 28 June 2026
- Champions: Saracens (4th title)
- Runners-up: Trailfinders
- Matches played: 75
- Tries scored: 704 (average 9.4 per match)
- Top point scorer: (England) Zoe Harrison (Saracens) – 173 points
- Top try scorer: Five players tied – 12 tries

Official website
- www.thepwr.com

The 2025–26 Premiership Women's Rugby season was the ninth season of England's top-flight domestic women's rugby union club competition. It was the third season to be branded as Premiership Women's Rugby.

The reigning champions entering the season were Gloucester–Hartpury, who claimed their third league title having won the 2025 final against Saracens.

Saracens won the 2025–26 title – their fourth overall, and their first since 2021–22 season – after defeating Trailfinders in the play-off final on 28 June 2026.

== Teams and locations ==
Locations of the Premiership Women's Rugby teams competing in the 2025–26 season
Locations of the Premiership Women's Rugby teams in Greater London

Club	Director of Rugby/ Head Coach	Captain(s)	Stadium(s)	Capacity	Location
Bristol Bears Women	(Scotland) Scott Lawson	(England) Abbie Ward	Ashton Gate (Note: Bristol Bears will also play one home game at Millennium Stadium, Cardiff.)	27,000	Bristol
Bristol Bears Women	(Scotland) Scott Lawson	(England) Abbie Ward	Shaftesbury Park	—	Bristol
Exeter Chiefs Women	(England) Steve Salvin	(England) Emily Robinson	Sandy Park	13,593	Exeter, Devon
Gloucester–Hartpury	(England) Dan Murphy	(England) Natasha Hunt (England) Zoe Stratford	Kingsholm	16,115	Gloucester, Gloucestershire
Harlequins Women	(England) Ross Chisholm	(Scotland) Jade Konkel-Roberts	Twickenham Stoop (Note: Harlequins will also play play one home game at Twickenham Stadium, London.)	14,800	Twickenham, Greater London
Leicester Tigers Women	(England) Fraser Goatcher (Note: Director of Rugby) (Scotland) Ross Bundy (Note: Head Coach)	(United States) Tess Feury	Welford Road	25,849	Leicester, Leicestershire
Loughborough Lightning	(England) Nathan Smith	(England) Daisy Hibbert-Jones	Franklin's Gardens	14,249	Northampton, Northamptonshire
Sale Sharks Women	(England) Tom Hudson	(United States) Georgie Perris-Redding	Heywood Road	3,387	Sale, Greater Manchester
Saracens Women	(England) Alex Austerberry	(England) May Campbell (England) Zoe Harrison	StoneX Stadium (Note: Saracens will also play play one home game at Tottenham Hotspur Stadium, London.)	10,500	Hendon, Greater London
Trailfinders Women	(England) Barney Maddison	(United States) Kate Zackary	Trailfinders Sports Ground	4,000	West Ealing, Greater London

=== Head coach changes ===
Ahead of the 2025–26 season, Bristol Bears, Exeter Chiefs, Gloucester–Hartpury, Leicester Tigers and Sale Sharks each announced changes to their head coach positions.

- Dave Ward departed Bristol Bears in April 2025, following the 2024–25 season, to take up the role of head coach with men's Champ Rugby club Ampthill. Scott Lawson was announced as his successor in June 2025.
- Susie Appleby departed Exeter Chiefs at the end of the 2024–25 season. Assistant coach Steve Salvin took charge.
- Sean Lynn departed Gloucester–Hartpury in March 2025, to take up the role of head coach with the Wales women's national team. Dan Murphy was announced as his successor in April 2025.
- Rachel Taylor departed Sale Sharks at the conclusion of 2024–25 season. She was replaced by Tom Hudson, who left Leicester Tigers to take up her role. Hudson was replaced at Leicester by Fraser Goatcher as director of rugby, and Ross Bundy as head coach in April 2025.

== Table ==
2025–26 Premiership Women's Rugby table
Pos	Team	Pld	W	D	L	PF	PA	PD	TF	TA	TB	LB	Pts	Qualification
1	Gloucester–Hartpury (SF)	16	14	0	2	644	360	+284	102	56	15	2	73	Qualifies for play-offs
2	Saracens (CH)	16	14	0	2	741	244	+497	113	40	14	1	71	Qualifies for play-offs
3	Exeter Chiefs (SF)	16	9	3	4	519	340	+179	82	54	14	0	56	Qualifies for play-offs
4	Trailfinders (RU)	16	7	2	7	492	507	−15	76	82	11	3	46	Qualifies for play-offs
5	Harlequins	16	6	1	9	462	482	−20	74	71	11	5	42	
6	Loughborough Lightning	16	5	2	9	481	532	−51	75	85	12	3	39	
7	Sale Sharks	16	6	1	9	393	462	−69	62	72	9	3	38	
8	Bristol Bears	16	6	1	9	396	471	−75	63	71	7	1	34	
9	Leicester Tigers	16	0	0	16	188	918	−730	30	146	3	0	3	

Updated to match(es) played on 7 June 2026. Source: Premiership Women's Rugby
Rules for classification: Tiebreakers for teams tied on points: 1) Number of matches won; 2) Difference between points for and against; 3) Total number of points for; 4) Aggregate number of points scored in matches between tied teams; 5) Number of matches won excluding the first match, then the second and so on until the tie is settled.

(CH) = Champions; (RU) = Runners-up; (SF) = Losing semi-finalists

=== Round-by-round progression ===
The grid below shows each team's progression throughout the season, indicating their points total (and league table position) at the end of every round:

Team Progression
Team	R1	R2	R3	R4	R5	R6	R7	R8	R9	R10	R11	R12	R13	R14	R15	R16	R17	R18
Gloucester–Hartpury	5 (2nd)	10 (1st)	15 (1st)	20 (1st)	25 (1st)	30 (1st)	30 (2nd)	35 (2nd)	40 (1st)	45 (1st)	50 (1st)	50 (2nd)	55 (2nd)	60 (1st)	65 (1st)	70 (1st)	72 (1st)	73 (1st)
Saracens	0 (8th)	5 (5th)	10 (2nd)	15 (2nd)	20 (2nd)	25 (2nd)	30 (1st)	35 (1st)	35 (2nd)	40 (2nd)	45 (2nd)	50 (1st)	55 (1st)	56 (2nd)	56 (2nd)	61 (2nd)	66 (2nd)	71 (2nd)
Exeter Chiefs	5 (3rd)	6 (3rd)	9 (3rd)	14 (3rd)	17 (3rd)	22 (3rd)	22 (3rd)	22 (4th)	27 (4th)	30 (4th)	35 (3rd)	35 (3rd)	36 (3rd)	41 (3rd)	46 (3rd)	46 (3rd)	51 (3rd)	56 (3rd)
Trailfinders	0 (7th)	0 (8th)	5 (8th)	10 (4th)	10 (6th)	12 (6th)	17 (6th)	20 (6th)	22 (5th)	25 (5th)	27 (5th)	32 (5th)	32 (5th)	32 (6th)	36 (5th)	41 (4th)	46 (4th)	46 (4th)
Harlequins	5 (4th)	5 (7th)	7 (6th)	8 (7th)	8 (7th)	13 (5th)	18 (5th)	23 (3rd)	28 (3rd)	31 (3rd)	32 (4th)	33 (4th)	34 (4th)	35 (4th)	36 (6th)	37 (6th)	42 (5th)	42 (5th)
Loughborough Lightning	1 (5th)	5 (6th)	8 (4th)	8 (5th)	13 (4th)	13 (4th)	18 (4th)	21 (5th)	22 (6th)	22 (6th)	22 (6th)	23 (6th)	25 (8th)	30 (7th)	32 (7th)	33 (7th)	34 (7th)	39 (6th)
Sale Sharks	5 (1st)	6 (2nd)	7 (5th)	8 (6th)	11 (5th)	11 (7th)	12 (7th)	12 (7th)	14 (7th)	14 (7th)	19 (7th)	23 (7th)	28 (6th)	33 (5th)	37 (4th)	37 (5th)	37 (6th)	38 (7th)
Bristol Bears	0 (6th)	5 (4th)	5 (8th)	5 (8th)	5 (8th)	5 (8th)	5 (8th)	5 (8th)	10 (8th)	13 (8th)	15 (8th)	20 (8th)	25 (7th)	25 (8th)	25 (8th)	29 (8th)	29 (8th)	34 (8th)
Leicester Tigers	0 (9th)	0 (9th)	0 (9th)	0 (9th)	0 (9th)	1 (9th)	1 (9th)	1 (9th)	1 (9th)	1 (9th)	1 (9th)	1 (9th)	1 (9th)	1 (9th)	1 (9th)	1 (9th)	2 (9th)	3 (9th)
Updated: 7 June 2026

Key
Win	Draw	Loss	Bye

== Regular season ==
The season was announced on 21 January 2025. The season start will be pushed back by three weeks due to the 2025 Women's Rugby World Cup. The regular season fixtures were announced on 6 August 2025.

Notes:

- All fixtures are subject to change.
- Referees appointed to officiate are employed by the RFU, unless indicated otherwise.

=== Results ===
Home \ Away	BRI	EXE	GLO	HAR	LEI	LOU	SAL	SAR	TRA
Bristol Bears	—	5–57	14–54	17–14	68–0	19–31	30–29	12–33	26–26
Exeter Chiefs	41–10	—	31–47	26–19	36–0	26–5	50–24	14–24	47–14
Gloucester–Hartpury	21–26	38–20	—	45–22	51–14	45–26	40–24	40–14	29–28
Harlequins	38–12	38–38	26–33	—	50–29	52–42	22–17	26–43	17–21
Leicester Tigers	0–74	0–43	12–75	28–56	—	36–50	3–62	0–81	19–40
Loughborough Lightning	21–24	33–33	38–43	43–33	50–15	—	19–12	24–62	29–29
Sale Sharks	25–7	26–26	7–22	15–12	46–17	31–29	—	17–36	22–64
Saracens	36–33	45–7	17–22	47–10	79–5	33–15	54–0	—	80–14
Trailfinders	45–19	12–24	41–39	26–27	57–10	39–26	31–36	5–57	—

Updated to match(es) played on 7 June 2026. Source: Premiership Women's Rugby
Legend: Blue = home team win; Yellow = draw; Red = away team win.

=== Round 1 ===
24 October 2025
19:30

(1 BP) Harlequins	52–42	Loughborough Lightning (1 BP)
Try: Fleming 21' c Wilcock 25' c Penalty try 33'; Torley 38' m Wythe 43' c Peña 50' c Konkel-Roberts 65' c Sims 78' m Con: Peña (5/7) 22', 26', 44', 51', 67'	Report	Try: Westcombe-Evans 8' c Calladine 17' c Maude 29' c Kabeya 40+2' c Treder 61' c Williams 68' c Con: Kelter (1/1) 9'; Nelson (5/5) 18', 30', 40+3', 62', 69'

Twickenham Stoop
Referee: Andy Wigley

25 October 2025
15:00

Trailfinders	12–24	Exeter Chiefs (1 BP)
Try: Zackary 53' c Ponsonby 67' m Con: Jones (1/2) 54'	Report	Try: McGoverne 13' m Rogers 19' c Nigrelli 35' c Cla. Moloney-MacDonald 49' m Con: McGoverne (2/4) 20', 37'

Trailfinders Sports Ground
Referee: Nikki O'Donnell

25 October 2025
19:00

(1 BP) Sale Sharks	46–17	Leicester Tigers
Try: Cokayne 6' m E. Jarrell-Searcy 11' c Penalty try 15'; Thorpe 19' m Lloyd 23' m Childs 32' m Relf 43' c Cowan 60' m Con: Duffy (2/7) 13', 44'	Report	Try: Feury (2) 40+1' m, 69' m Penalty try 78'

Heywood Road
Referee: Michael Lamb

26 October 2025
15:00

(1 BP) Gloucester–Hartpury	40–14	Saracens
Try: Muir 2' c K. Jones (2) 13' c, 52' c Shekells 18' m Monaghan 44' c Heard 65' c Con: Sing (5/6) 3', 14', 45', 53', 66'	Report	Try: Campbell 48' c MacDougall 69' c Con: Harrison (2/2) 49', 70'

Kingsholm
Referee: Holly Wood

Bye/s: Bristol Bears

=== Round 2 ===
1 November 2025
15:00

(1 BP) Exeter Chiefs	31–47	Gloucester–Hartpury (1 BP)
Try: Allen (2) 21' c, 54' m Poulin 59' m Menin (2) 66' c, 80+4' c Con: McGoverne (3/5) 22', 67', 80+5'	Report	Try: N. Metcalfe (2) 8' c, 40+1' c Heard (3) 13' c, 29' m, 56' c Sing 23' c Penalty try 77'; Con: Sing (5/6) 9', 14', 24', 40+2', 57'

Sandy Park
Referee: Matthew Sharpe

2 November 2025
13:00

Leicester Tigers	0–74	Bristol Bears (1 BP)
	Report	Try: Gallagher 4' m David (4) 6' c, 43' m, 51' c, 55' m Bonner (3) 17' c, 22' c, 80' c Lovibond (2) 24' c, 57' m Phillips 34' c Dale 77' m Con: Bevan (5/7) 7', 18', 23', 25', 35'; Hesketh (1/3) 52'; Evans (1/2) 80+1'

Welford Road
Referee: Holly Wood

2 November 2025
13:00

Loughborough Lightning	19–12	Sale Sharks (1 BP)
Try: Brody 29' m Lutui (2) 43' c, 57' c Con: Nelson (2/3) 44', 58'	Report	Try: Kasolo 55' m Lloyd 80+4' c Con: Aitchison (1/2) 80+5'

Franklin's Gardens
Referee: Nikki O'Donnell

2 November 2025
15:00

(1 BP) Saracens	47–10	Harlequins
Try: Corrigan (2) 1' m, 47' c Clifford 7' c Linkins 10' c Royer 34' c McMillan 75' c MacDougall 79' c Con: Harrison (6/7) 8', 11', 35', 48', 76', 80'	Report	Try: Shillaker 18' m Kildunne 72' m

StoneX Stadium
Attendance: 3,733
Referee: Richard Gordon

Bye/s: Trailfinders

=== Round 3 ===
8 November 2025
15:00

(1 BP) Sale Sharks	22–64	Trailfinders (1 BP)
Try: Lloyd (2) 8' m, 60' m Cokayne 28' c Fielding 78' m Con: Aitchison (1/4) 29'	Report	Try: Ponsonby 2' m Burton 12' c McGhie 16' c Jones 20' c White 31' m Schell (2) 39' m, 75' c Cox (2) 41' c, 64' c Inman 69' c Con: Jones (5/8) 13', 17', 21', 42', 65'; N. Gallagher (2/2) 71', 76'

Heywood Road
Referee: Charlie Gayther

9 November 2025
12:30

(2 BP) Harlequins	26–33	Gloucester–Hartpury (1 BP)
Try: Konkel-Roberts 12' c Turani 20' m Phillips 36' c Parry 45' c Con: Peña (3/4) 13', 37', 46'	Report	Try: Hunt 6' c Sing 25' c Monaghan 49' m Matthews 61' c Venner 70' c Con: Sing (4/5) 7', 26', 62', 71'

Twickenham Stoop
Referee: Henry Pearson

9 November 2025
14:30

Bristol Bears	12–33	Saracens (1 BP)
Try: Lovibond 9' m Gallagher 30' c Con: Bevan (1/2) 31'	Report	Try: Apps 16' c Campbell 21' c Corrigan 35' c Clifford 62' c Field 80+1' m Con: Harrison (4/4) 17', 22', 36', 63'

Shaftesbury Park
Referee: Mike Hudson

9 November 2025
14:30

(1 BP) Loughborough Lightning	33–33	Exeter Chiefs (1 BP)
Try: Kabeya 9' c Kelter (2) 23' c, 52' c Calladine 66' m Davey 79' c Con: Nelson (4/5) 10', 24', 53', 80'	Report	Try: Menin (2) 14' c, 68' c Allen 36' c Cla. Moloney-MacDonald 43' c E. Robinson 47' m Con: McGoverne (4/5) 15', 37', 44', 69'

Franklin's Gardens
Referee: Holly Wood

Bye/s: Leicester Tigers

=== Round 4 ===
15 November 2025
15:00

(1 BP) Gloucester–Hartpury	40–24	Sale Sharks (1 BP)
Try: Lund (3) 6' c, 45' m, 50' c Matthews 16' c Tuipulotu 28' c N. Jones 58' c Con: George (4/5) 7', 17', 29', 51'; Goulden (1/1) 59'	Report	Try: E. Jarrell-Searcy 2' c Prothero 35' m Campbell 66' m Fray 75' c Con: Aitchison (2/4) 3', 76'

Kingsholm
Referee: George Ounsley

15 November 2025
15:00

(1 BP) Saracens	79–5	Leicester Tigers
Try: Rose (2) 3' m, 39' m MacDougall 9' c Field 22' m Omokhuale 32' c Sellors 45' c Crake 51' c P. Cleall (3) 56' c, 75' c, 80' m McKenna 59' m Tutt 72' m Apps 77' c Con: MacDougall (7/13) 10', 33', 46', 52', 57', 76', 78'	Report	Try: Labeyrie 63' m

StoneX Stadium
Referee: Rebecca Piddlesden

15 November 2025
15:00

(1 BP) Trailfinders	45–19	Bristol Bears
Try: Malcolm 7' m Ponsonby (2) 10' c, 49' c White (2) 31' m, 60' c Borland 40+1' c Taylor 63' c Con: Jones (5/7) 11', 40+2', 50', 61', 64'	Report	Try: Pam 17' c Bern 26' c Gallagher 52' m Con: Bevan (2/3) 18', 27'

Trailfinders Sports Ground
Referee: Benjamin Wood

16 November 2025
12:30

(1 BP) Exeter Chiefs	26–19	Harlequins (1 BP)
Try: Tessier 14' c Allen 24' c Tuttosi 40+1' m F. Robinson 69' c Con: McGoverne (3/4) 15', 25', 71'	Report	Try: Mikaele-Tu'u 48' c Kildunne 51' m Svoboda 76' c Con: Peña (1/2) 49'; Cromack (1/1) 77'

Sandy Park
Referee: Holly Wood

Bye/s: Loughborough Lightning

=== Round 5 ===
29 November 2025
14:00

(1 BP) Sale Sharks	26–26	Exeter Chiefs (1 BP)
Try: Lloyd 5' c Campbell 22' m Pyrs 41' c Talling 48' c Con: Aitchison (3/4) 6', 42', 49'	Report	Try: Rule 31' c Allen 37' c E. Robinson 63' c Rogers 75' m Con: McGoverne (3/4) 32', 38', 64'

Heywood Road
Referee: Daniel Rowlands

29 November 2025
15:00

(1 BP) Loughborough Lightning	50–15	Leicester Tigers
Try: Scott 7' c Treder 14' c Westcombe-Evans (4) 17' c, 37' m, 48' c, 75' m Waudby 54' m Calladine 70' c Con: Nelson (5/8) 8', 15', 18', 49', 71'	Report	Try: Lingham 3' m Labeyrie 25' m Henrich 67' m

Franklin's Gardens
Referee: Samuel Yates

29 November 2025
15:00

Trailfinders	5–57	Saracens (1 BP)
Try: McGhie 3' m	Report	Try: Gregson 6' m Packer 16' c Corrigan 28' c Sharp 34' m Campbell (2) 39' c, 60' c P. Cleall 45' c Crake 67' c Breach 80' m Con: Harrison (6/9) 17', 29', 40', 46', 61', 68'

Trailfinders Sports Ground
Referee: Matt Sharpe

30 November 2025
12:30

Bristol Bears	14–54	Gloucester–Hartpury (1 BP)
Try: Gallagher 55' c Skuse 76' c Con: Bevan (1/1) 56'; Skuse (1/1) 77'	Report	Try: Monaghan 3' c Venner 11' c Perry 24' c Heard 28' c Beckett 36' c Lewis 41' c Lund 61' c N. Metcalfe 68' m Con: Sing (7/8) 4', 12', 25', 29', 37', 43', 62'

Ashton Gate
Referee: Harry Walbaum

Bye/s: Harlequins

=== Round 6 ===
6 December 2025
13:00

(1 BP) Exeter Chiefs	41–10	Bristol Bears
Try: Duguid 12' c F. Robinson 18' m McGoverne 26' m Cli. Moloney-MacDonald 33' m Poulin 50' c Tessier 63' m Allen 66' c Con: McGoverne (2/6) 13', 67'; Cantorna (1/1) 51'	Report	Try: David 22' m Orr 48' m

Sandy Park
Referee: Henry Pearson

6 December 2025
15:05

(1 BP) Gloucester–Hartpury	29–28	Trailfinders (2 BP)
Try: Shekells 18' c N. Jones 28' c Williams 40+2' m Beckett (2) 54' m, 62' m Con: Sing (1/1) 19'; George (1/4) 29'	Report	Try: Borland (2) 9' c, 67' c Laflin 56' c N. Gallagher 75' c Con: Jones (4/4) 10', 57', 68', 76'

Kingsholm
Referee: Nikki O'Donnell

6 December 2025
17:05

(1 BP) Leicester Tigers	28–56	Harlequins (1 BP)
Try: Günter 6' c Feury 10' c Vincent 49' c Daley 65' c Con: Bitter (4/4) 7', 11', 50', 66'	Report	Try: Parry 1' c Phillips (3) 22' c, 39' c, 44' c Powell (2) 53' c, 61' c Aucken 68' c Kildunne 77' c Con: Cromack (5/5) 2', 23', 40', 45', 54'; Peña (3/3) 62', 69', 78'

Welford Road
Referee: Andy Wigley

7 December 2025
15:00

(1 BP) Saracens	33–15	Loughborough Lightning
Try: Corrigan 2' m Apps (2) 9' c, 67' c Galligan 63' c Packer 73' c Con: Harrison (4/5) 10', 64', 68', 74'	Report	Try: Calladine 38' m Kabeya 47' m Hibbert-Jones 54' m

StoneX Stadium
Referee: Michael Lamb

Bye/s: Sale Sharks

=== Round 7 ===
13 December 2025
13:00

(1 BP) Trailfinders	57–10	Leicester Tigers
Try: Laflin (2) 1' m, 22' c Zackary 4' c N. Gallagher 8' c Brincat 27' m Bradley 43' c Blanco 55' m Norman-Bell 72' c Meta 80+1' c Con: Inman (6/9) 6', 9', 23', 44', 73', 80+3'	Report	Try: Kacirkova 34' m Bitter 78' m

Trailfinders Sports Ground
Referee: Michael Lamb

13 December 2025
15:05

Exeter Chiefs	14–24	Saracens (1 BP)
Try: Tessier (2) 6' c, 34' c Con: Cantorna (2/2) 7', 35'	Report	Try: Campbell 26' m Omokhuale 38' m McMillan 43' c Rose 55' c Con: Harrison (2/4) 44', 56'

Sandy Park
Referee: Jamie Parr

13 December 2025
17:30

(1 BP) Harlequins	22–17	Sale Sharks (1 BP)
Try: Kildunne 21' m Wilcock 35' m Parry 44' c Powell 66' m Con: Cromack (1/3) 45'	Report	Try: Lloyd 3' c Campbell 69' c Con: Aitchison (2/2) 4', 70'; Pen: Duffy (1/1) 40+1'

Twickenham Stoop
Referee: Nikki O'Donnell

14 December 2025
15:00

Bristol Bears	19–31	Loughborough Lightning (1 BP)
Try: Bonner 6' m Orr 25' c Lovibond 29' c Con: Demant (2/3) 26', 30'	Report	Try: Sagapolu (2) 17' c, 34' c Maude 45' c Kelter 57' c Con: Nelson (4/4) 18', 35', 46', 58'; Pen: Nelson (1/1) 72'

Shaftesbury Park
Referee: Mike Hudson

Bye/s: Gloucester–Hartpury

=== Round 8 ===
20 December 2025
15:05

(1 BP) Harlequins	38–12	Bristol Bears
Try: Mikaele-Tu'u 7' c Torley 18' m Kildunne 20' c Peña 32' c Aucken (2) 65' c, 80' m Con: Cromack (2/3) 8', 33'; Peña (2/3) 21', 66'	Report	Try: David 23' m Dale 54' c Con: Bevan (1/2) 55'

Allianz Stadium
Referee: Alex Thomas

21 December 2025
13:00

Sale Sharks	17–36	Saracens (1 BP)
Try: Campbell (2) 37' m, 66' m Pyrs 56' c Con: Aitchison (1/3) 57'	Report	Try: Corrigan 8' c Field (2) 20' c, 24' c Bridger 41' m Apps 47' c Con: Harrison (4/5) 9', 21', 25', 48'; Pen: Harrison (1/1) 80+1'

Heywood Road
Referee: Henry Pearson

21 December 2025
14:00

(1 BP) Loughborough Lightning	29–29	Trailfinders (1 BP)
Try: Kabeya (2) 13' m, 31' c Treder 50' m Scott 62' m Bermudez 80+1' c Con: Nelson (2/5) 32', 80+2'	Report	Try: Burton 10' m Ponsonby 20' c Zackary 65' c Inman 78' c Con: Inman (3/4) 22', 66', 79'; Pen: Inman (1/1) 72'

Franklin's Gardens
Referee: Andy Wigley

21 December 2025
15:00

Leicester Tigers	12–75	Gloucester–Hartpury (1 BP)
Try: Penalty try 6'; Russell 70' m	Report	Try: Sing (2) 2' c, 79' c Williams (2) 11' c, 32' c Venner (2) 24' c, 46' c Pyrs 39' c Copson 56' c Dallavalle (2) 66' c, 80+2' m Shekells 73' c Con: Sing (10/11) 3', 12', 25', 33', 40', 47', 57', 67', 74', 80'

Welford Road
Referee: Matthew Sharpe

Bye/s: Exeter Chiefs

=== Round 9 ===
30 January 2026
19:30

(2 BP) Trailfinders	26–27	Harlequins (1 BP)
Try: Ponsonby 22' c Burton 27' m Inman 52' c Roos 62' c Con: Inman (3/4) 23', 53', 63'	Report	Try: Wafer (3) 3' m, 43' m, 70' m Cromack 33' m Callender 80+1' c Con: Peña (1/2) 80+2'

Trailfinders Sports Ground
Referee: Charlie Gayther

1 February 2026
13:00

(1 BP) Bristol Bears	30–29	Sale Sharks (2 BP)
Try: Dale 12' m Bonner 18' m Lovibond 41' m Bevan 54' c Demant 59' m Con: Bevan (1/5) 55'; Pen: Bevan (1/1) 80+2'	Report	Try: Kasolo 5' c Lloyd 8' m Campbell (2) 23' m, 29' m Cokayne 70' c Con: Aitchison (1/4) 6'; E. Jarrell-Searcy (1/1) 71'

Shaftesbury Park
Referee: Michael Lamb

1 February 2026
13:00

(1 BP) Exeter Chiefs	36–0	Leicester Tigers
Try: Sinclair 17' c Buchanan 26' m McGillivray 32' c Feaunati 41' m McGoverne 52' m Wall 75' c Con: McGoverne (3/6) 18', 33', 76'	Report

Sandy Park
Referee: Natarsha Ganley (New Zealand)

1 February 2026
15:00

(1 BP) Gloucester–Hartpury	45–26	Loughborough Lightning (1 BP)
Try: N. Metcalfe (3) 6' c, 21' m, 30' c K. Jones 44' m Brock 51' c Stratford 63' c Hendy 76' c Con: Sing (5/7) 7', 31', 52', 64', 77'	Report	Try: Ehrecke 12' c Treder 53' c Kelter 71' m Belisle 80' c Con: Nelson (3/4) 13', 54', 80+1'

Kingsholm
Referee: Hamish Grant

Bye/s: Saracens

=== Round 10 ===
7 February 2026
12:00

(1 BP) Bristol Bears	26–26	Trailfinders (1 BP)
Try: Bern 5' c Gallagher 20' c Bevan 23' c Bonner 57' c Con: Bevan (3/4) 6', 21', 24'	Report	Try: Laflin 27' c White 44' c Malcolm 59' m Uren 77' c Con: N. Gallagher (3/4) 28', 45', 78'

Shaftesbury Park
Referee: Natarsha Ganley (New Zealand)

7 February 2026
12:30

Sale Sharks	7–22	Gloucester–Hartpury (1 BP)
Try: Hyndman 17' c Con: Aitchison (1/1) 18'	Report	Try: Venner 1' m K. Jones 11' c Sing 28' m Lund 62' m Con: Sing (1/3) 12'

Heywood Road
Referee: Andrew Jackson

8 February 2026
13:00

Leicester Tigers	0–81	Saracens (1 BP)
	Report	Try: Campbell (2) 4' c, 37' c Breach (4) 6' c, 31' c, 57' m, 69' m Farries 9' m Evans 14' c Bridger 22' c Sharp (2) 40' c, 53' m Verghese 41' c Sellors 45' m Con: Harrison (7/8) 5', 7', 15', 23', 32', 38', 40+1'; MacDougall (1/5) 42'

Welford Road
Referee: Charlie Gayther

8 February 2026
15:00

(1 BP) Harlequins	38–38	Exeter Chiefs (1 BP)
Try: Wafer 2' c Torley 13' c Kildunne 35' c Parry 61' m Mikaele-Tu'u 70' c Tuima 80+6' m Con: Cromack (4/5) 3', 14', 36', 71'	Report	Try: Tessier (2) 8' c, 42' c Tuttosi 29' c Granzotto 32' c F. Robinson 40+1' c Con: McGoverne (5/5) 9', 30', 33', 40+2', 43'; Pen: McGoverne (1/1) 65'

Twickenham Stoop
Referee: Andy Wigley

Bye/s: Loughborough Lightning

=== Round 11 ===
14 February 2026
12:00

(1 BP) Gloucester–Hartpury	45–22	Harlequins (1 BP)
Try: Williams 9' c Tuipulotu (2) 26' m, 31' c K. Jones 50' c Heard 60' c Muir 68' c Simpson 74' m Con: George (5/7) 10', 32', 51', 61', 69'	Report	Try: Cromack 18' m Torley 37' m Mikaele-Tu'u 53' c Wafer 63' m Con: Cromack (1/3) 54'

Kingsholm
Referee: Natarsha Ganley (New Zealand)

14 February 2026
15:00

(2 BP) Trailfinders	31–36	Sale Sharks (1 BP)
Try: Penalty try 16'; Blanco (2) 29' m, 40+5' c Leatherman 42' m Ponsonby 56' c Con: N. Gallagher (2/4) 40+6', 57'	Report	Try: Hogan-Rochester 23' c Childs 35' c Hogan 47' c Cokayne 61' c Fray 69' m Con: Duffy (4/5) 24', 36', 48', 62'; Pen: Duffy (1/1) 80+2'

Trailfinders Sports Ground
Referee: Andy Wigley

15 February 2026
13:00

(1 BP) Exeter Chiefs	26–5	Loughborough Lightning
Try: Granzotto 10' m Rule 20' c Rogers 28' c Wall 80+1' c Con: Cantorna (2/3) 21', 29'; McGoverne (1/1) 80+2'	Report	Try: Treder 17' m

Sandy Park
Referee: Matt Sharpe

15 February 2026
13:30

(1 BP) Saracens	36–33	Bristol Bears (2 BP)
Try: Clifford (2) 35' m, 40' c Campbell (2) 48' c, 71' c Apps 56' c Con: Harrison (4/5) 40+1', 49', 57', 72'; Pen: Harrison (1/1) 78'	Report	Try: David 4' m Demant 7' c Bern (2) 28' c, 31' c Bevan 75' c Con: Bevan (4/5) 8', 29', 32', 76'

StoneX Stadium
Referee: Michael Lamb

Bye/s: Leicester Tigers

=== Round 12 ===
21 February 2026
13:15

Leicester Tigers	19–40	Trailfinders (1 BP)
Try: McCalman 10' c Günter 28' m Lingham 80' c Con: Feury (2/3) 11', 80+1'	Report	Try: Tuffnail (2) 8' c, 33' c N. Gallagher 39' c Wassell 55' c Meta 71' c Bradley 79' m Con: N. Gallagher (5/6) 9', 34', 40', 56', 72'

Welford Road
Referee: Daniel Rowlands

21 February 2026
15:00

Sale Sharks	15–12	Harlequins (1 BP)
Try: Lloyd 13' m Cokayne 23' c Con: Duffy (1/2) 24'; Pen: Duffy (1/1) 40+1'	Report	Try: Peña 34' m Konkel-Roberts 56' c Con: Cromack (1/2) 57'

Heywood Road
Referee: Ben Simpson

21 February 2026
19:30

(1 BP) Saracens	45–7	Exeter Chiefs
Try: P. Cleall (2) 13' c, 28' c Packer 34' c Clifford 47' c Corrigan 52' m Sellors 68' m Omokhuale 78' c Con: Harrison (4/6) 14', 29', 35', 48'; MacDougall (1/1) 79'	Report	Try: Rogers 80+3' c Con: McGoverne (1/1) 80+4'

StoneX Stadium
Referee: Mike Hudson

22 February 2026
15:00

(1 BP) Loughborough Lightning	21–24	Bristol Bears (1 BP)
Try: Ehrecke 22' c Kabeya 27' c Hibbert-Jones 41' c Con: Nelson (3/3) 23', 28', 42'	Report	Try: David (2) 12' m, 58' m Gallagher 46' c Orr 66' c Con: Bevan (2/4) 47', 67'

Franklin's Gardens
Referee: Natarsha Ganley (New Zealand)

Bye/s: Gloucester–Hartpury

=== Round 13 ===
6 March 2026
19:30

(1 BP) Gloucester–Hartpury	38–20	Exeter Chiefs (1 BP)
Try: Brock 3' m K. Jones 15' c Muir (2) 21' c, 27' c Venner 44' c Lewis 51' m Con: George (4/6) 16', 22', 28', 45'	Report	Try: Poulin 8' m van der Velden 38' m Sinclair 61' m Cla. Moloney-MacDonald 78' m

Kingsholm
Referee: Charlie Gayther

7 March 2026
12:15

(1 BP) Harlequins	26–43	Saracens (1 BP)
Try: Konkel-Roberts 11' m Wafer 27' c Tuima 69' c Cromack 75' c Con: Cromack (3/4) 28', 70', 76'	Report	Try: Campbell (3) 6' c, 48' m, 52' c Bridger 18' c Apps 31' c Breach 39' c Con: Harrison (5/6) 7', 19', 32', 40', 53'; Pen: Harrison (1/1) 80'

Twickenham Stoop
Referee: Jamie Parr

7 March 2026
14:30

(1 BP) Bristol Bears	68–0	Leicester Tigers
Try: Short (2) 1' c, 16' c Lovibond 11' c Woodman 23' c Clarke 29' c Herring 40+1' m Burns 58' c Hesketh 62' c Gallagher 67' c Bevan 75' c Con: Smith (9/10) 2', 12', 17', 24', 30', 59', 63', 68', 76'	Report

Shaftesbury Park
Referee: Matt Sharpe

7 March 2026
15:00

(1 BP) Sale Sharks	31–29	Loughborough Lightning (2 BP)
Try: Lloyd 21' m E. Jarrell-Searcy 44' c Cokayne 49' m Childs 60' c Pyrs 71' c Con: Duffy (3/5) 45', 61', 73'	Report	Try: Kelter 2' c Ives Campion 15' c Hibbert-Jones 52' c Mataitoga 75' m Con: Nelson (3/4) 3', 16', 53'; Pen: Nelson (1/1) 35'

Heywood Road
Referee: Nikki O'Donnell

Bye/s: Trailfinders

=== Round 14 ===
13 March 2026
19:30

(1 BP) Loughborough Lightning	43–33	Harlequins (1 BP)
Try: Maude 20' m Hibbert-Jones 31' c Westcombe-Evans (3) 34' c, 39' m, 67' m Belisle 43' c Morrall 76' c Con: Rowland (4/7) 32', 35', 44', 77'	Report	Try: Kildunne 12' c Konkel 26' c Aucken 48' m Parry 57' c Cromack 80+1' c Con: Cromack (4/5) 13', 27', 58', 80+2'

Franklin's Gardens
Referee: Joe James

14 March 2026
12:30

(1 BP) Exeter Chiefs	47–14	Trailfinders
Try: Cli. Moloney-MacDonald (3) 4' c, 19' c, 40+1' c Rule 44' m Cla. Moloney-MacDonald 59' c Allen (2) 64' c, 70' c Con: McGoverne (3/4) 5', 20', 40+3'; Cantorna (3/3) 59', 65', 70'	Report	Try: Borland 12' c Ponsonby 55' c Con: N. Gallagher (2/2) 13', 57'

Sandy Park
Referee: Richard Gordon

14 March 2026
13:00

Leicester Tigers	3–62	Sale Sharks (1 BP)
Pen: Feury (1/1) 9'	Report	Try: Wright 18' m Rigoni 25' c Perrin 39' c Hogan-Rochester 42' m Lloyd (2) 48' m, 79' m Kasolo 52' c Duffy 58' c Capell (2) 61' c, 70' c Con: Duffy (4/7) 25', 40', 53', 59'; Irwin (2/3) 62', 72'

Welford Road
Referee: Andy Wigley

15 March 2026
12:30

(1 BP) Saracens	17–22	Gloucester–Hartpury (1 BP)
Try: Apps 5' c Hardy 21' c Con: Harrison (2/2) 6', 22'; Pen: Harrison (1/1) 69'	Report	Try: Matthews (3) 18' c, 38' m, 74' m Dallavalle 64' m Con: George (1/4) 19' c

StoneX Stadium
Referee: Sara Cox

Bye/s: Bristol Bears

=== Round 15 ===
20 March 2026
19:30

(1 BP) Harlequins	17–21	Trailfinders
Try: Powell 35' m Whythe 45' c Wilcock 72' m Con: Peña (1/3) 46'	Report	Try: Kalounivale 6' c Bradley 55' c Burton 76' c Con: N. Gallagher (3/3) 7', 56', 78'

Twickenham Stoop
Referee: Craig Maxwell-Keys

21 March 2026
12:30

Leicester Tigers	0–43	Exeter Chiefs (1 BP)
	Report	Try: Menin (2) 14' m, 36' c Feaunati 18' c F. Robinson 21' c Buchanan 23' m Rogers 76' c Dare 80+1' m Con: Cantorna (3/5) 19', 22', 38'; Nigrelli (1/2) 77'

Welford Road
Referee: Matt Sharpe

22 March 2026
12:15

(2 BP) Loughborough Lightning	38–43	Gloucester–Hartpury (1 BP)
Try: Kabeya 15' c Ives Campion 23' c Westcombe-Evans 38' c Bermudez 41' m Morrall 43' m Kelter 76' c Con: Rowland (4/6) 16', 23', 39', 77'	Report	Try: Venner (3) 1' m, 45' m, 71' m Goulden 12' c Dallavalle 51' c Perry 60' c Heard 78' c Con: George (4/7) 13', 52', 61', 79'

Franklin's Gardens
Referee: Henry Pearson

22 March 2026
15:00

Sale Sharks	25–7	Bristol Bears
Try: E. Jarrell-Searcy 16' c Campbell 30' c Childs 80+2' m Con: Duffy (2/3) 17', 31'; Pen: Duffy (2/2) 53', 69'	Report	Try: Buisa 18' c Con: Bevan (1/1) 19'

CorpAcq Stadium
Referee: Michael Lamb

Bye/s: Saracens

=== Round 16 ===
28 March 2026
12:30

Bristol Bears	17–14	Harlequins (1 BP)
Try: Balogun 4' m Orr (2) 53' c, 63' m Con: Bevan (1/3) 54'	Report	Try: Wilcock 20' c Wafer 33' c Con: Cromack (2/2) 21', 34'

Principality Stadium
Referee: Hamish Grant

28 March 2026
14:30

(1 BP) Saracens	54–0	Sale Sharks
Try: Apps 4' c P. Cleall 6' c Senft 9' m Packer 20' c Crake 24' c Clifford 63' c Sharp 65' c Breach 79' c Con: Harrison (7/8) 5', 7', 21', 25', 64', 66', 80'	Report

Tottenham Hotspur Stadium
Attendance: 16,001
Referee: Nikki O'Donnell

29 March 2026
12:15

(1 BP) Trailfinders	39–26	Loughborough Lightning (1 BP)
Try: Burton (3) 3' m, 24' m, 52' m White 16' m Jones 41' m Amory 46' c Tuffnail 67' c Con: N. Gallagher (1/5) 46'; Taylor (1/1) 68'	Report	Try: Kelter 6' c Sagapolu 32' m Westcombe-Evans 39' c Kabeya 73' c Con: Rowland (3/4) 7', 40', 73'

Trailfinders Sports Ground
Referee: Richard Gordon

29 March 2026
14:30

(1 BP) Gloucester–Hartpury	51–14	Leicester Tigers
Try: Venner (2) 1' m, 54' m Lund (2) 13' c, 74' m Pritchard 22' m Tuipulotu 22' c Blackburn 40' c Copson (2) 42' m, 66' m Con: Sing (3/5) 14', 23', 40+1'	Report	Try: Lingham 9' c McCalman 39' c Con: Feury (2/2) 10', 39'

Kingsholm
Referee: Andy Wigley

Bye/s: Exeter Chiefs

=== Round 17 ===
29 May 2026
19:30

(1 BP) Trailfinders	41–39	Gloucester–Hartpury (2 BP)
Try: Ponsonby 3' c Leatherman 33' m Head 40+3' m Amory 41' c Uren 52' c Cox 58' c Con: N. Gallagher (2/4) 4', 42'; Inman (2/2) 53', 59'; Pen: Inman (1/1) 68'	Report	Try: Sing 8' m K. Jones 16' m Venner 21' m Lewis (2) 43' c, 62' m N. Jones 75' m Pritchard 80' c Con: Sing (2/7) 44', 80+1'

Trailfinders Sports Ground
Referee: Hamish Grant

30 May 2026
13:00

Bristol Bears	5–57	Exeter Chiefs (1 BP)
Try: Bonner 23' m	Report	Try: Cla. Moloney-MacDonald (2) 2' c, 45' c Allen 18' c F. Robinson (2) 31' c, 34' c Rogers 48' m Granzotto (2) 52' m, 67' m Poulin 54' c Con: Tessier (6/9) 3', 19', 32', 35', 46', 55'

Shaftesbury Park
Referee: Benjamin Wood

30 May 2026
14:30

(1 BP) Harlequins	50–29	Leicester Tigers (1 BP)
Try: Packer 2' c Aucken 9' m Hanlon 12' c Cromack (2) 15' c, 49' m C. Powell 25' c K. Powell 31' m Meuller 55' c Con: Cromack (5/8) 3', 13', 16', 26', 56'	Report	Try: Günter 21' m Pickwick 35' c McCalman (2) 60' c, 78' c Con: Bitter (3/4) 36', 61', 79'; Pen: Bitter (1/1) 7'

Twickenham Stoop
Referee: Nikki O'Donnell

31 May 2026
12:00

(1 BP) Loughborough Lightning	24–62	Saracens (1 BP)
Try: Kabeya (2) 1' c, 17' c Westcombe-Evans 69' m Williams 80' m Con: Rowland (2/4) 2', 18'	Report	Try: Farries (3) 12' c, 57' c, 71' c Crake 27' c Omokhuale 33' c Gregson (5) 43' m, 49' m, 61' c, 65' m, 75' m Con: Harrison (5/8) 13', 28', 34', 58', 62'; MacDougall (1/2) 72'

Franklin's Gardens
Referee: Holly Wood

Bye/s: Sale Sharks

=== Round 18 ===
7 June 2026
15:30

(1 BP) Exeter Chiefs	50–24	Sale Sharks (1 BP)
Try: Cla. Moloney-MacDonald (4) 17' c, 38' m, 43' m, 62' c Tuttosi 27' c Rogers (2) 35' m, 59' c F. Robinson 47' c Con: Tessier (3/6) 18', 28', 48'; McGoverne (1/1) 60'; Nigrelli (1/1) 63'	Report	Try: Perris-Redding 6' c Cokayne 33' m Hogan 67' m Lloyd 72' c Con: Duffy (2/4) 7', 73'

Sandy Park
Referee: Nikki O'Donnell

7 June 2026
15:30

(1 BP) Gloucester–Hartpury	21–26	Bristol Bears (1 BP)
Try: Bunker (2) 32' c, 53' c Tuipulotu 42' c Con: Green (3/3) 33', 43', 54'	Report	Try: Bonner (2) 18' m, 24' c Bern 34' c Phillips 73' c Con: Bevan (3/4) 25', 35', 74'

Kingsholm
Referee: Holly Wood

7 June 2026
15:30

(1 BP) Leicester Tigers	36–50	Loughborough Lightning (1 BP)
Try: Vincent 1' c Henrich 34' c Kacirkova (2) 37' m, 72' m Günter (2) 47' c, 59' m Con: Bitter (3/6) 2', 35', 48'	Report	Try: Lutui (2) 4' c, 24' c Kabeya 13' c Westcombe-Evans 27' m Hibbert-Jones (2) 43' c, 63' c Davey 51' m Stathopoulos 80+3' m Con: Rowland (5/8) 5', 14', 25', 45', 64'

Welford Road
Referee: Matthew Sharpe

7 June 2026
15:30

(1 BP) Saracens	80–14	Trailfinders
Try: Sharp 7' c Packer 14' c Bridger 23' c Penalty try 26'; Corrigan (2) 33' m, 45' c Farries (2) 39' c, 53' c de Goede (2) 49' c, 67' c Breach 51' c Tremelling 56' m Con: Harrison (5/6) 8', 15', 24', 40', 46'; Blacklock (4/5) 50', 52', 54', 68'	Report	Try: Molton 29' c N. Gallagher 43' c Con: N. Gallagher (2/2) 30', 44'

StoneX Stadium
Referee: Benjamin Wood

Bye/s: Harlequins

== Play-offs ==
As in previous seasons, the top four teams in the league table, following the conclusion of the regular season, contested the play-off semi-finals in a 1st vs 4th and 2nd vs 3rd format, with the higher ranking team having home advantage. The two winners of the semi-finals then met in the final at Twickenham Stoop on 28 June 2026.

=== Semi-finals ===
14 June 2026
14:00

Gloucester–Hartpury	26–29	Trailfinders
Try: Heard 9' c Lund 45' c Brock 50' c Dallavalle 67' m Con: George (3/4) 10', 46', 51'	Report	Try: Montiel 13' m Jones 19' c Norman-Bell (2) 33' c, 53' m Uren 40+1' m Con: N. Gallagher (2/5) 20', 34'

Kingsholm
Referee: Henry Pearson

Team details

Gloucester–Hartpury
FB	15	Nel Metcalfe	(substituted off) 76'
RW	14	Mia Venner
OC	13	Hannah Dallavalle
IC	12	Tatyana Heard	(substituted off) 65'
LW	11	Rachel Lund
FH	10	Lleucu George
SH	9	Sian Jones	(substituted off) 52'
LP	1	Mackenzie Carson	(substituted off) 52'
HK	2	Kelsey Jones	(substituted off) 63'
TP	3	Maud Muir	(substituted off) 61'
LL	4	Sam Monaghan
RL	5	Sarah Beckett (c)	(substituted off) 35'
BF	6	Steph Else
OF	7	Bethan Lewis	(substituted off) 65'
N8	8	Georgia Brock
Replacements:
HK	16	Neve Jones	(substituted on) 63'
PR	17	El Perry	(substituted on) 61'
PR	18	Sisilia Tuipulotu	(substituted on) 52'
LK	19	Jorja Aiono	(substituted on) 65'
LK	20	Alaw Pyrs	(substituted on) 35'
SH	21	Bianca Blackburn	(substituted on) 52'
FH	22	Molly Bunker	(substituted on) 65'
WG	23	Lizzie Goulden	(substituted on) 76'
Coach:
Dan Murphy

Trailfinders
FB	15	Niamh Gallagher		(substituted off) 58'
RW	14	Carys Cox	(yellow card) 8'
OC	13	Megan Jones
IC	12	Emma Uren
LW	11	Grace White		(substituted off) 58'	(substituted on) 61'
FH	10	Claire Gallagher
SH	9	Isla Norman-Bell
LP	1	Alivia Leatherman	(yellow card) 51'
HK	2	Georgia Ponsonby		(substituted off) 68'
TP	3	Maya Montiel		(substituted off) 68'
LL	4	Alana Borland
RL	5	Emma Wassell
BF	6	Haidee Head		(substituted off) 61'
OF	7	Kate Zackary (c)
N8	8	Abi Burton
Replacements:
HK	16	Cristina Blanco		(substituted on) 68'
PR	17	Annabel Meta		(substituted on) 58'	(substituted off) 61'
PR	18	Cassandra Tuffnail		(substituted on) 68'
LK	19	Emma Taylor		(substituted on) 61'
FL	20	Sally Williams
SH	21	Sophie Molton
CE	22	Celia Quansah
FH	23	Rosie Inman		(substituted on) 58'
Coach:
Barney Maddison

Player of the Match:
Claire Gallagher (Trailfinders)

Assistant referees:
Charlie Gayther
Neil Chivers
Television match official:
Dan Jones

14 June 2026
16:30

Saracens	40–38	Exeter Chiefs
Try: Corrigan 7' c Breach (2) 15' c, 74' m Rose 23' c Apps (2) 30' c, 56' c Con: Harrison (5/6) 8', 16', 24', 31', 57'	Report	Try: Cla. Moloney-MacDonald 3' m Rogers (2) 17' c, 40+3' m Rule 33' c Cli. Moloney-MacDonald 38' c Allen 67' c Con: McGoverne (4/6) 18', 34', 39', 68'

StoneX Stadium
Referee: Richard Gordon

Team details

Saracens
FB	15	Jess Breach
RW	14	Alysha Corrigan
OC	13	Sydney Gregson
IC	12	Sophie Bridger		(substituted off) 75'
LW	11	Lotte Sharp		(substituted off) 53'
FH	10	Zoe Harrison (cc)
SH	9	Olivia Apps
LP	1	Liz Crake		(substituted off) 40'
HK	2	Bryony Field
TP	3	Donna Rose		(substituted off) 68'
LL	4	Julia Omokhuale
RL	5	Laetitia Royer		(substituted off) 45'
BF	6	Gabby Senft		(substituted off) 68'
OF	7	Marlie Packer (cc)	(yellow card) 32'
N8	8	Sophie de Goede
Replacements:
HK	16	Carmen Tremelling		(substituted on) 68'
PR	17	Kelsey Clifford		(substituted on) 40'
PR	18	Chloe Flanagan
FL	19	Georgia Evans		(substituted on) 68'
N8	20	Poppy Cleall		(substituted on) 45'
SH	21	Tori Sellors
FH	22	Amelia MacDougall		(substituted on) 75'
CE	23	Emma Hardy		(substituted on) 53'
Coach:
Alex Austerberry

Exeter Chiefs
FB	15	Sabrina Poulin
RW	14	Katie Buchanan
OC	13	Alex Tessier
IC	12	Nancy McGillivray	(substituted off) 73'
LW	11	Claudia Moloney-MacDonald
FH	10	Liv McGoverne
SH	9	Flo Robinson
LP	1	Hope Rogers
HK	2	Cliodhna Moloney-MacDonald	(substituted off) 75'
TP	3	Amy Rule	(substituted off) 75'
LL	4	Linde van der Velden
RL	5	Dorothy Wall	(substituted off) 61'
BF	6	Emily Robinson (c)
OF	7	Maisy Allen
N8	8	DaLeaka Menin
Replacements:
HK	16	Emily Tuttosi	(substituted on) 75'
PR	17	Abby Middlebrooke
PR	18	Lola Whitley
LK	19	Gabriella Nigrelli	(substituted on) 75'
FL	20	Zoe Dare	(substituted on) 61'
SH	21	Lucy Nye
CE	22	Danielle Preece
FB	23	Merryn Elworthy	(substituted on) 73'
Coach:
Steve Salvin

Player of the Match:
Olivia Apps (Saracens)

Assistant referees:
Hamish Grant
Calum Howard
Television match official:
Craig Maxwell-Keys

=== Final ===
28 June 2026
15:00

Saracens	52–14	Trailfinders
Try: Omokhuale 12' c Packer (2) 21' m, 28' c Gregson 32' c Breach (2) 40' c, 76' c Corrigan 45' m Harrison 51' c Con: Harrison (6/8) 13', 29', 33', 41', 52', 77'	Report	Try: Montiel 48' c Burton 63' c Con: Inman (1/1) 49'; N. Gallagher (1/1) 64'

Twickenham Stoop
Attendance: 8,099
Referee: Holly Wood

Saracens
FB	15	Jess Breach
RW	14	Alysha Corrigan
OC	13	Emma Hardy		(substituted off) 65'
IC	12	Sophie Bridger		(substituted off) 65'
LW	11	Sydney Gregson
FH	10	Zoe Harrison (cc)
SH	9	Olivia Apps		(substituted off) 74'
LP	1	Kelsey Clifford		(substituted off) 69'
HK	2	Bryony Field
TP	3	Donna Rose		(substituted off) 59'
LL	4	Julia Omokhuale		(substituted off) 74'
RL	5	Laetitia Royer		(substituted off) 59'
BF	6	Gabby Senft	(yellow card) 39'	(substituted off) 62'
OF	7	Marlie Packer (cc)	(yellow card) 62'
N8	8	Sophie de Goede
Replacements:
HK	16	Carmen Tremelling		(substituted on) 69'
PR	17	Liz Crake		(substituted on) 59'
PR	18	Chloe Flanagan		(substituted on) 74'
FL	19	Georgia Evans		(substituted on) 62'
N8	20	Poppy Cleall		(substituted on) 59'
SH	21	Tori Sellors		(substituted on) 74'
FH	22	Amelia MacDougall		(substituted on) 65'
WG	23	Lotte Sharp		(substituted on) 65'
Coach:
Alex Austerberry

Trailfinders
FB	15	Rosie Inman	(substituted off) 50'
RW	14	Vicky Laflin
OC	13	Megan Jones
IC	12	Carys Cox
LW	11	Grace White
FH	10	Claire Gallagher
SH	9	Isla Norman-Bell	(substituted off) 61'
LP	1	Alivia Leatherman	(substituted off) 52'
HK	2	Georgia Ponsonby	(substituted off) 61'
TP	3	Maya Montiel	(substituted off) 52'
LL	4	Alana Borland
RL	5	Emma Wassell	(substituted off) 56'
BF	6	Haidee Head	(substituted off) 61'
OF	7	Kate Zackary (c)	(substituted off) 70'
N8	8	Abi Burton
Replacements:
HK	16	Cristina Blanco	(substituted on) 61'
PR	17	Annabel Meta	(substituted on) 52'
PR	18	Cassandra Tuffnail	(substituted on) 52'
LK	19	Emma Taylor	(substituted on) 56'
FL	20	Rachel Malcolm	(substituted on) 61'
FL	21	Sally Williams	(substituted on) 70'
SH	22	Brooke Bradley	(substituted on) 61'
FH	23	Niamh Gallagher	(substituted on) 50'
Coach:
Barney Maddison

Player of the Match:
Julia Omokhuale (Saracens)

Assistant referees:
Mike Hudson
James Pidding
Television match official:
Craig Maxwell-Keys

== Leading scorers ==
Note: Flags to the left of player names indicate national team as has been defined under World Rugby eligibility rules, or primary nationality for players who have not yet earned international senior caps. Players may hold one or more non-WR nationalities.

=== Most points ===
As of 28 June 2026

Rank	Player	Club	Points
1	(England) Zoe Harrison	Saracens	173
2	(England) Emma Sing	Gloucester–Hartpury	116
3	(England) Ella Cromack	Harlequins	88
3	(New Zealand) Liv McGoverne	Exeter	88
5	(Wales) Keira Bevan	Bristol	73
6	(Ireland) Niamh Gallagher	Trailfinders	70
7	(Scotland) Helen Nelson	Loughborough	68
8	Five players tied		60

=== Most tries ===
As of 28 June 2026

Rank	Player	Club	Tries
1	(England) Jess Breach	Saracens	12
1	(England) May Campbell	Saracens	12
1	(Scotland) Rhona Lloyd	Sale	12
1	(England) Mia Venner	Gloucester–Hartpury	12
1	(England) Bo Westcombe-Evans	Loughborough	12
6	(Canada) Olivia Apps	Saracens	11
6	(Canada) Alysha Corrigan	Saracens	11
6	(England) Sadia Kabeya	Loughborough	11
6	(England) Claudia Moloney-MacDonald	Exeter	11
10	Four players tied		10

== Discipline ==
=== Citings/bans ===
Player/Coach	Match (Note: The club of the cited player or coach is listed in bold italics.)	Hearing date	Law breached	Result	Ref
(Sweden) Katie Childs	**Sale** vs. Leicester (25 October 2025)	27 October 2025	9.27 – 2 Yellow Cards (Red card)	Sending off sufficient	

== PWR Cup ==
2025 PWR Cup
- Countries: England
- Number of teams: 9
- Date: 23 August – 11 October 2025
- Champions: Saracens (2nd title)
- Runners-up: Harlequins
- Matches played: 20
- Tries scored: 199 (average 10 per match)
- Top point scorer: Amelia MacDougall (Saracens) – 69 points
- Top try scorer: Reneeqa Bonner (Bristol Bears) – 8 tries

Official website
- www.thepwr.com

The PWR Cup returned following a hiatus in 2024–25. The competition acted as a pre-season developmental tournament. In the PWR Cup, teams were drawn into two pools one of five teams and one of four teams. The pools were based on the 2024–25 Premiership Women's Rugby season standings. The top eight teams were placed using alternate seeding (1st in Pool A, 2nd in Pool B, 3rd in Pool A, etc.). The ninth team was randomly assigned to decide which pool had five teams. Each team played every team in their pool once, home or away.

The fixtures were announced on 17 June 2025. Teams that secured the top two positions within their respective pools advanced to the semi-finals, with the top ranked teams receiving home advantage. The winning teams from the semi-finals then progressed to the final, while the losing teams competed in the third-place play-off.

Saracens won the 2025 PWR Cup, retaining their title from 2023–24, after they defeated Harlequins in the final at StoneX Stadium on 11 October 2025.

=== Pool A ===
2025 PWR Cup Pool A table
Pos	Team	Pld	W	D	L	PF	PA	PD	TF	TA	TB	LB	Pts	Qualification
1	Harlequins	3	3	0	0	140	75	+65	22	13	3	0	**15**	Play-offs
2	Exeter Chiefs	3	2	0	1	84	99	−15	14	15	2	0	**10**	Play-offs
3	Trailfinders	3	1	0	2	87	69	+18	15	11	2	0	**6**	
4	Gloucester-Hartpury	3	0	0	3	69	137	−68	11	23	2	1	**3**	

Updated to match(es) played on 21 September 2025. Source: RFU

==== Round 1 ====
23 August 2025
15:00

**(1 BP) Harlequins**	**61–29**	**Exeter Chiefs (1 BP)**
Try: Cowell 1' m Cromack 17' c Parry (2) 24' c, 58' c Hanlon (2) 42' c, 76' c Svoboda (2) 49' c, 67' c Torley 65' c Con: Cromack (6/7) 18', 24', 43', 50', 59', 65'; Tuima (2/2) 68', 77'	Report	Try: Bricknell (2) 5' m, 46' c Robinson (2) 21' m, 27' c Allen 35' c Con: McGoverne (3/5) 28', 35', 47'

Cobham RFC

24 August 2025
15:00

**(1 BP) Trailfinders**	**60–12**	**Gloucester–Hartpury**
Try: Bradley 11' c White (3) 24' m, 49' c, 55' c Tuffnail 38' c Inman 43' m Laflin (2) 58' m, 80' m Amory 60' m James 74' c Con: Taylor (4/6) 12', 39', 50', 56'; N. Gallagher (1/4) 75'	Report	Try: Venner 17' c Buggy 35' m Con: Green (1/2) 18'

Trailfinders Sports Ground

==== Round 3 ====
7 September 2025
13:00

**(2 BP) Gloucester–Hartpury**	**33–36**	**Exeter Chiefs (1 BP)**
Try: Wilson 33' c Goulden 50' c Venner 55' c Else (2) 69' c, 76' m Con: Green (4/5) 34', 51', 56', 70'	Report	Try: McGoverne 10' c Skeates 20' m Buchanan 24' c Allen 28' m Preece 42' m Swann 58' c Con: McGoverne (3/6) 11', 25', 59'

Hartpury Stadium
Referee: Charles Gayther

7 September 2025
14:00

**(1 BP) Harlequins**	**38–22**	**Trailfinders (1 BP)**
Try: Powell (4) 3' c, 16' m, 44' m, 62' c Svoboda 26' c Aucken 79' c Con: Cromack (4/6) 4', 27', 63', 80'	Report	Try: Swailes 29' m Holland 34' m N. Gallagher 40' c Jones 57' m Con: Taylor (1/4) 40+1'

Horsham RFC
Referee: Ben Wood

==== Round 5 ====
20 September 2025
13:00

**Exeter Chiefs**	**19–5**	**Trailfinders**
Try: Priest 16' c Skeates 22' c Buchanan 45' m Con: McGoverne (2/3) 16', 22'	Report	Try: Holland 79' m

Sandy Park
Referee: Charles Gayther

21 September 2025
13:00

**(1 BP) Gloucester–Hartpury**	**24–41**	**Harlequins (1 BP)**
Try: Lund 41' m Else 55' m Venner 64' c Copson 80+3' c Con: Goulden (2/4) 65', 80+5'	Report	Try: Powell 1' m Whythe (2) 6' c, 34' c Svoboda 12' c Cromack 27' m Shillaker 31' m Meuller 75' m Con: Cromack (3/7) 7', 14', 35'

Hartpury Stadium
Referee: Mike Hudson

=== Pool B ===
2025 PWR Cup Pool B table
Pos	Team	Pld	W	D	L	PF	PA	PD	TF	TA	TB	LB	Pts	Qualification
1	Saracens	4	4	0	0	199	63	+136	31	9	4	0	**20**	Play-offs
2	Bristol Bears	4	3	0	1	137	93	+44	23	14	3	0	**15**	Play-offs
3	Sale Sharks	4	2	0	2	113	70	+43	19	12	2	1	**11**	
4	Loughborough Lightning	4	1	0	3	140	144	−4	21	24	3	1	**8**	
5	Leicester Tigers	4	0	0	4	26	245	−219	4	39	0	0	**0**	

Updated to match(es) played on 21 September 2025. Source: RFU

==== Round 1 ====
23 August 2025
12:00

**(1 BP) Loughborough Lightning**	**28–37**	**Sale Sharks (1 BP)**
Try: Green 19'; Davey 27' c Scantlebury 48' c Bell 70' c Con: Green (4/4) 19', 27', 48', 70'	Report	Try: Kasolo (3) 4' c, 38' m, 67' m Thorpe (2) 33' m, 74' m Hyndman 45' m Bowman 51' m Con: Duffy (1/7) 4'

Loughborough University

24 August 2025
14:00

**Leicester Tigers**	**7–58**	**Bristol Bears (1 BP)**
Try: Fereday 66' c Con: Feury (1/1) 67'	Report	Try: David 7' c Carr 17' m Bonner (4) 21' m, 29' m, 35' m, 38' m Murray (2) 24' c, 32' c Lovibond 44' c Short 77' m Con: Bailey (1/3) 8'; Hesketh (3/7) 25', 33', 45'

Burton RFC

Bye/s: Saracens

==== Round 2 ====
30 August 2025
15:00

**(1 BP) Saracens**	**45–28**	**Bristol Bears (1 BP)**
Try: Wright-Haley 6' c McMillan 38' c Wills 40+1' c Field 47' m Tremelling 52' c Crake 63' c Bridger 78' m Con: MacDougall (5/7) 7', 39', 40+2', 53', 64'	Report	Try: Lovibond 10' c Burns 27' c Murray 43' c Jah 74' c Con: Hesketh (4/4) 11', 28', 44', 75'

StoneX Stadium

31 August 2025
14:00

**Leicester Tigers**	**12–69**	**Loughborough Lightning (1 BP)**
Try: Lingham 28' m Deane 50' c Con: Priestnall (1/2) 51'	Report	Try: Bell 1' m Hibbert-Jones 6' c Calladine (2) 9' m, 42' c Morrall 14' c Scantlebury (3) 21' c, 59' c, 71' m Fitzpatrick 45' c Curphey 61' c Green 68' m Con: Green (7/11) 7', 15', 22', 43', 46', 60', 62'

Lichfield RFC

Bye/s: Sale Sharks

==== Round 3 ====
6 September 2025
14:00

**Loughborough Lightning**	**14–59**	**Saracens (1 BP)**
Try: Lutui 12' c Bell 63' c Con: Green (2/2) 13', 65'	Report	Try: Bridger 5' c Wills 19' c Linkins (2) 25' m, 80' c MacDougall 27' c P. Cleall (2) 34' c, 42' c Wright-Haley 55' c Hardy 66' m Con: MacDougall (6/8) 6', 20', 28', 35', 43', 56'; Linkins (1/1) 80+1'

Loughborough University
Referee: Henry Pearson

7 September 2025
14:00

**(1 BP) Sale Sharks**	**50–0**	**Leicester Tigers**
Try: Fielding (2) 11' c, 23' c Thorpe (2) 13' m, 55' m Prothero 28' c Cowan (2) 46' c, 67' c Moore 70' m Con: Duffy (5/8) 12', 24', 29', 47', 68'	Report

Heywood Road
Referee: Mike Hudson

Bye/s: Bristol Bears

==== Round 4 ====
13 September 2025
12:00

**Sale Sharks**	**14–27**	**Saracens (1 BP)**
Try: Fielding (2) 34' c, 62' c Con: Duffy (2/2) 35', 63'	Report	Try: Linkins 8' m Wright-Haley 21' m Field 36' m Wyrwas 52' c Wills 68' m Con: MacDougall (1/5) 53'

Heywood Road
Referee: Matthew Sharpe

13 September 2025
13:00

**(1 BP) Bristol Bears**	**36–29**	**Loughborough Lightning (2 BP)**
Try: Pashaei-Tarighoun (2) 2' m, 34' m Lovibond 31' c Picton-Powell 54' m Bonner (2) 60' c, 70' c Con: Hesketh (3/6) 32', 61', 71'	Report	Try: Clifford 26' c Roberts 39' c Waudby 46' c Knight 79' m Con: Green (3/4) 28', 40+1', 47'; Pen: Green (1/1) 58'

Shaftesbury Park
Referee: Ben Wood

Bye/s: Leicester Tigers

==== Round 5 ====
21 September 2025
14:00

**Bristol Bears**	**15–12**	**Sale Sharks (1 BP)**
Try: Jah 41' m Lovibond 59' m Murray 71' m	Report	Try: Hyndman 1' c Thorpe 9' m Con: Duffy (1/2) 2'

Shaftesbury Park
Referee: Holly Wood

21 September 2025
14:00

**(1 BP) Saracens**	**68–7**	**Leicester Tigers**
Try: Sellors (2) 6' c, 22' c Wills 12' c Field 28' c Gregson (2) 40' m, 78' c Crake 53' c McMillan 59' c Linkins 67' c Bennett 70' c Con: MacDougall (9/10) 7', 13', 24', 29', 54', 60', 68', 71', 79'	Report	Try: Kacirkova 26' c Con: Feury (1/1) 27'

StoneX Stadium
Referee: Michael Lamb

Bye/s: Loughborough Lightning

=== Cup play-offs ===
Semi-finals
5 October – StoneX Stadium
**Saracens**	**39**
Exeter Chiefs	5
5 October – Twickenham Stoop
**Harlequins**	**41**
Bristol Bears	36

Final
11 October – StoneX Stadium
**Saracens**	**43**
Harlequins	33
Third place
11 October – Shaftesbury Park
Bristol Bears	12
**Exeter Chiefs**	**40**

==== Cup semi-finals ====
5 October 2025
14:00

**Harlequins**	**41–36**	**Bristol Bears**
Try: McIntosh 5' m Wilcock 11' c Shillaker 15' c Wythe 21' m Sims (2) 69' c, 74' c Con: Tuima (1/1) 12'; Cromack (3/5) 16', 70', 75'; Pen: Cromack (1/1) 37'	Report	Try: Picton-Powell 1' m Pashaei-Tarighoun 8' m Bonner (2) 43' c, 62' c Lovibond 53' m Short 59' c Con: Hesketh (1/4) 44'; Evans (2/2) 60', 63'

Twickenham Stoop
Referee: Michael Lamb

5 October 2025
14:00

**Saracens**	**39–5**	**Exeter Chiefs**
Try: Wills (2) 3' m, 42' m McKenna 9' m Linkins 22' m P. Cleall 32' m MacDougall 39' c Hardy 55' c Con: MacDougall (2/7) 40', 56'	Report	Try: Allen 5' m

StoneX Stadium
Referee: Matthew Sharpe

==== Third-place play-off ====
11 October 2025
13:00

**Bristol Bears**	**12–40**	**Exeter Chiefs**
Try: van der Straaten (2) 70' c, 78' m Con: Hesketh (1/2) 71'	Report	Try: Cli. Moloney-MacDonald 2' c Granzotto 6' c Allen 15' c Rogers 21' c Nigrelli 51' m Bricknell 55' c Con: McGoverne (5/6) 3', 7', 16', 22', 56'

Shaftesbury Park
Referee: Emily Hope

==== Cup final ====
11 October 2025
14:00

**Saracens**	**43–33**	**Harlequins**
Try: Crake (2) 4' c, 26' m Field 20' c Sellors 46' c P. Cleall 57' c Wright-Haley 64' c Con: MacDougall (5/6) 5', 22', 47', 58', 65'; Pen: MacDougall (1/1) 80+2'	Report	Try: Torley (2) 9' c, 49' c Shillaker 31' m Wilcock 41' c Cromack 67' c Con: Cromack (4/5) 10', 42', 50', 68'

StoneX Stadium
Referee: Nikki O'Donnell

Team details

FB	15	(England) Sarah McKenna
RW	14	(England) Jemma-Jo Linkins	(substituted off) 58'
OC	13	(England) Sydney Gregson
IC	12	(England) Emma Hardy
LW	11	(England) Deborah Wills
FH	10	(England) Amelia MacDougall
SH	9	(England) Tori Sellors
N8	8	(England) Poppy Cleall
OF	7	(England) Charlotte Wright-Haley
BF	6	(England) Joia Bennett	(substituted off) 72'
RL	5	(England) Jodie Verghese	(substituted off) 56'
LL	4	(Scotland) Louise McMillan (c)
TP	3	(England) Carmen Tremelling	(substituted off) 65'
HK	2	(England) Bryony Field	(substituted off) 56'
LP	1	(England) Liz Crake	(substituted off) 65'
Substitutions:
HK	16	(England) May Campbell	(substituted on) 56'
PR	17	(England) Akina Gondwe	(substituted on) 65'
PR	18	(Wales) Donna Rose	(substituted on) 65'
LK	19	(Wales) Georgia Evans	(substituted on) 56'
BR	20	(England) Bryony Cleall	(substituted on) 72'
PR	21	(England) Chloe Flanagan
CE	22	(Scotland) Beth Blacklock	(substituted on) 58'
WG	23	(Wales) Amelia Tutt
Coach:
(England) Alex Austerberry

FB	15	(England) Lauren Torley
RW	14	(England) Katie Shillaker		(substituted off) 51'
OC	13	(England) Sarah Parry
IC	12	(England) Lagi Tuima (c)
LW	11	(England) Beth Wilcock
FH	10	(England) Ella Cromack
SH	9	(Ireland) Emma Swords		(substituted off) 59'
N8	8	(England) Nicole Wythe		(substituted off) 66'	(substituted on) 72'
OF	7	(Canada) Sara Svoboda
BF	6	(England) Maddy Page		(substituted off) 51'
RL	5	(Scotland) Natasha Logan		(substituted off) 59'
LL	4	(Scotland) Fiona McIntosh
TP	3	(England) Lizzie Hanlon
HK	2	(England) Connie Powell			(substituted off) 72'
LP	1	(England) Hannah Sims		(substituted off) 51'
Substitutions:
HK	16	(Sweden) Maja Meuller		(substituted on) 66'
PR	17	(England) Jessie Spurrier		(substituted on) 51'
PR	18	(England) Ruby Winstanley
LK	19	(England) Tyla Shirley		(substituted on) 59'
BR	20	(England) Lauren Brooks	(yellow card) 61'	(substituted on) 51'
SH	21	(England) Lucy Burgess		(substituted on) 59'
WG	22	(England) Heather Cowell		(substituted on) 51'
CE	23	(England) Amy Layzell
Coach:
(England) Ross Chisholm

Player of the Match:
(England) Amelia MacDougall (Saracens)

Assistant referees:
Jenny Burrows
Rebecca Piddlesden
