= Maddie Feaunati =

England international rugby union player

- Born: 18 May 2002 (age 24) Leeds, England
- Height: 171 cm (5 ft 7 in)
- Weight: 85 kg (187 lb; 13 st 5 lb)
- Notable relative: Isaac Fe'aunati (father)

Rugby union career
- Position: Back Row
Senior career
Years	Team	Apps	(Points)
2023–	Exeter Chiefs	11	(10)
Provincial / State sides
Years	Team	Apps	(Points)
2020–2021	Otago Spirit	8	(0)
2022–2023	Wellington Pride	11	(0)
Super Rugby
Years	Team	Apps	(Points)
2023	Hurricanes Poua	4	(0)
International career
Years	Team	Apps	(Points)
2024–	England	23	(25)
Medal record
Representing England
Women's rugby union
Rugby World Cup
Gold medal – first place	2025 England	Team competition

Maddie Feaunati (born 18 May 2002) is an English rugby union player. She plays internationally for England and for Exeter Chiefs in the Premiership Women's Rugby.

== Early life ==
Feaunati was born in Leeds, England before moving to New Zealand as a nine year old, she later attended St Mary's College in Wellington. She played netball, and rugby alongside her three sisters. She is the daughter of former Samoan international and Bath No. 8 Isaac ‘Zak’ Feaunati, who also played Jonah Lomu in the 2009 film Invictus.

She competed for New Zealand Touch Blacks Mixed U18s in the 2020 Youth Trans Tasman against Australia.

She has a degree in digital marketing.

== Rugby career ==
Feaunati played provincially for Otago Spirit and Wellington Pride in the Farah Palmer Cup. She has also played for Hurricanes Poua in the Super Rugby Aupiki competition.

She made her Chiefs debut against Leicester Tigers in the Allianz Cup and made her first league start against Ealing Trailfinders in January 2024. She and younger sister, Zara, signed a new contract with Chiefs for next season.

Feaunati made her test debut for England against Italy in the 2024 Six Nations on 24 March. She made five appearances off the bench during the tournament and scored her first international try against Ireland at Twickenham on 20 April in the Red Roses 88–10 victory. She was also qualified to play for Samoa and New Zealand. She got her first start for the Red Roses in the September test against France. She was brought in as a replacement for the injured, Sadia Kabeya.

Feaunati was confirmed as a member of England's 30-player squad for the 2024 WXV 1 tournament that is held in Canada. On 17 March 2025, she was named in England's squad for the Women's Six Nations Championship. She was later named in the side for the 2025 Women's Rugby World Cup.

== Honours ==
England

- Women's Rugby World Cup
  - (gold) Champion (1): 2025
