= Bryony Field =

English rugby union player

- Born: 30 October 2000 (age 26)
- Height: 1.72 m (5 ft 8 in)
- Weight: 83 kg (183 lb)
- School: Wakefield Girls High School

Rugby union career
- Position: Hooker
Senior career
Years	Team	Apps	(Points)
–2023	Loughborough Lightning		
2023–	Saracens Women		(=)
- Correct as of 15 January 2025
International career
Years	Team	Apps	(Points)
2026-	England		

Bryony Field (born 30 October 2000) is an English rugby union footballer who plays as a hooker for Saracens Women and England.

== Career ==
From Yorkshire, Field attended Wakefield Girls High School. While she played at Huddersfield RUFC from the age of six to twelves years-old, she went on to play at West Park Leeds RUFC. As a 15 year-old, Field was called-up to play for England U18 in 2016. She went on to almost represent England at under-20 level.

A hooker, Field started playing for Saracens Women ahead of the 2023-24 season having signed from Loughborough Lightning. She signed a new contract with the club in 2024 after a successful debut season. Field won the PWR Cup title with Saracens Women during the 2025/2026 season, scoring a try in the final against Harlequins. Shs also played later that season as the club also won the 2025–26 Premiership Women's Rugby championship title with a win against Trailfinders Women.

Field was included in the England women's national rugby union team squad ahead of the 2026 WXV, and was named as a replacement for England’s opening game against Australia on 12 September, scoring a try on debut in the second-half in a 48-15 victory. The following week, Field was named for her first start for England against Canada, also scoring a try on her first start in a 19-19 draw.
