= Georgie Lingham =

Great Britain international rugby union player

- Born: 20 August 1995 (age 31)
- Height: 1.80 m (5 ft 11 in)
- Weight: 73 kg (161 lb; 11 st 7 lb)

Rugby union career
- Position: Wing
- Current team: Loughborough Lightning
Senior career
Years	Team	Apps	(Points)
-2017	West Norfolk		
2017–2021	Saracens		
2021–?	Loughborough Lightning		
2025–	Leicester Tigers		
International career
Years	Team	Apps	(Points)
2020 -	England		
2023 -	Great Britain		

Georgie Lingham (born 20 August 1995) is an English rugby union player. She plays for the Great Britain women's national rugby sevens team, having also played for England sevens, as well as Loughborough Lightning and Saracens Women.

== Early life ==
From North Wootton, Norfolk she started her rugby union career playing for West Norfolk Rugby Club.

== Club career ==
Lingham made her debut for Saracens Women in September 2017. She played for the side in the Premier 15s, her efforts including scoring a hat-trick of tries against Worcester Valkyries in December 2018. She finished that season as the club’s top try scorer and was also awarded the Premier 15s try of the season for a solo effort against Richmond Women.

She left Saracens in August 2021 and subsequently joined fellow top division club Loughborough Lightning. Her performances for Loughborough included a hat-trick against Wasps Women in March 2023.

She will join Leicester Tigers Women for the 2025–26 Premiership Women's Rugby season.

== International career ==
Lingham was first selected for the England women's national rugby sevens team in January 2020.

In January 2023, she was called-up to the Great Britain women's national rugby sevens team. In December 2023, she was called-up to the GB Sevens Team for the Sevens World Series event in South Africa. She was subsequently selected for the 2024-25 SVNS series which began at the Dubai Sevens on 30 November 2024. She played at the Singapore Sevens in the spring of 2025 as her Great Britain team secured their place in the 2025 World Championship in California. She returned to the squad for the 2026 Sevens Series event in Valladolid.

== Personal life ==
She attended the College of West Anglia where she was handed the accolade of sports woman of the year on 19 June 2018.
