= Celia Quansah =

English rugby sevens player

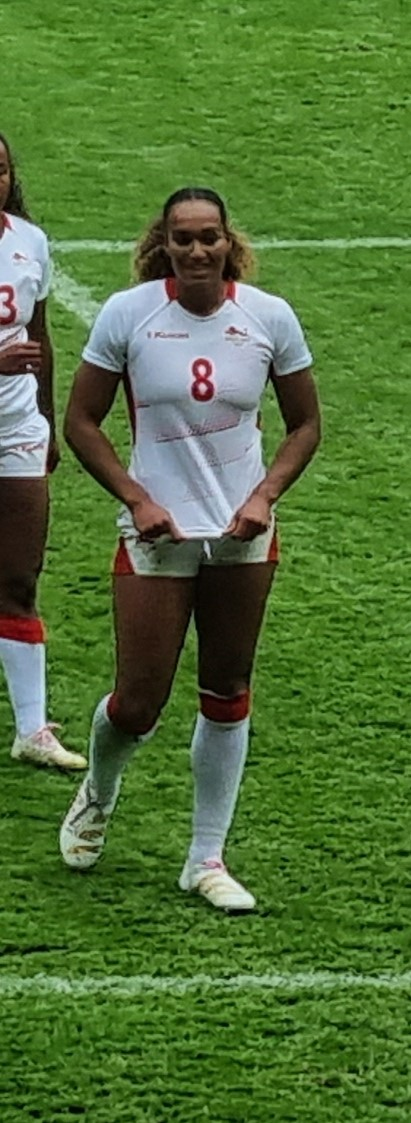
- Full name: Celia Quansah
- Born: 26 October 1995 (age 31) Twickenham, England
- Height: 1.75 m (5 ft 9 in)
- Weight: 82 kg (181 lb)

Rugby union career
- Position: Wing
Senior career
Years	Team	Apps	(Points)
2017–2020	Loughborough Lightning		
2020–2023	Wasps		
2023-2025	Leicester Tigers Women	3	
2025-2026	Trailfinders Women		
2026	Barbarians	1	(5)
National sevens team
Years	Team		Comps
- Great Britain

Celia Quansah (born 25 October 1995) is an English rugby sevens player who plays for Trailfinders Women. She was selected as a member of the Great Britain women's national rugby sevens team for the 2020 Summer Olympics.

== Biography ==
Born to a Ghanaian father and English mother, Quansah grew up in Twickenham. She participated in athletics, winning the long jump event at the 2011 School Games, and represented England internationally in heptathlon, competing at the British Championships against Jessica Ennis-Hill. Whilst at university, she took up rugby. After playing for six months, she was invited to join the England Sevens programme for 2018/19, and played for the winning Great Britain team at the 2019 Rugby Europe Women's Sevens Olympic Qualifying Tournament.

She was selected as a member of the Great Britain women's national rugby sevens team for the 2020 Summer Olympics. She was named in the England squad for the 2022 Rugby World Cup Sevens – Women's tournament held in Cape Town, South Africa in September 2022.

In 2026, Quanshah appeared with alongside contestant Kate Butch in the Makeover Challenge, the seventh episode, of Rupaul's Drag Race: UK vs. the World season three.

== Personal life ==
Quansah is openly lesbian, and is in a same-sex relationship with her England 7s teammate Megan Jones. The couple represented Great Britain together at the 2020 Tokyo Olympics.
