= Reneeqa Bonner =

English rugby union player (born 2004)

- Born: 8 April 2004 (age 22)
- School: Clevedon School; SGS College
- University: Hartpury University
- Notable relative(s): Macenzzie Duncan, brother

Rugby union career
- Position: Winger
Senior career
Years	Team	Apps	(Points)
2022-	Bristol Bears		
International career
Years	Team	Apps	(Points)
2024-	England U20		
National sevens team
Years	Team		Comps
2024-	GB 7s		

Reneeqa Bonner (born 8 April 2004) is an English rugby union player who plays as a winger for Bristol Bears Women and the Great Britain women's national rugby sevens team.

== Early life ==
From Clevedon, North Somerset, she attended Clevedon School, SGS College and Hartpury College. She participated in many sports growing up, including boxing, swimming, hockey and gymnastics.

== Club career ==
Initially a keen football player, she gave up football after starting playing rugby at Clevedon Girls as a member of their first ever girls side. She later played for Dings Crusaders in Bristol before being selected for the Bristol Bears Centre of Excellence.

She joined up with the senior Bristol Bears Women side ahead of the 2022-23 season. After establishing herself as a regular she scored nine tries in 18 league and cup appearances to help her club to two finals during the 2023–24 Premiership Women's Rugby season and featuring for the full 80 minutes in the final of the Allianz Cup. Her performances for Bristol Bears have included an eight minute hat trick against Loughborough Lightning, and a decisive late try in their comeback win over Saracens in Premiership Women's Rugby semi final in June 2024.

Bonner continued with Bristol for the 2025-26 season, her performances including a hat-trick of tries in a match win against Leicester Tigers Women on 2 November 2025. In June 2026, she was named in the Rugby Players' Association’s Under-23 Team of the Season.

== International career ==
She represented England at U18 level. She was selected for England U20 in 2024.

She featured for the Great Britain women's national rugby sevens team at the Dubai Sevens in November 2024, part of the 2024-25 SVNS series. Subsequently, she was called-up to the England national women's rugby union team in January 2025.

== Personal life ==
Her brother Macenzzie Duncan is a professional rugby union player for Glasgow Warriors and has played internationally for Emerging Scotland. Due to their speed on the rugby field, Bonner and her teammate Millie David have been nicknamed Bristol's 'Whizz Kids'.
