= Rhona Lloyd =

Scotland international rugby union player

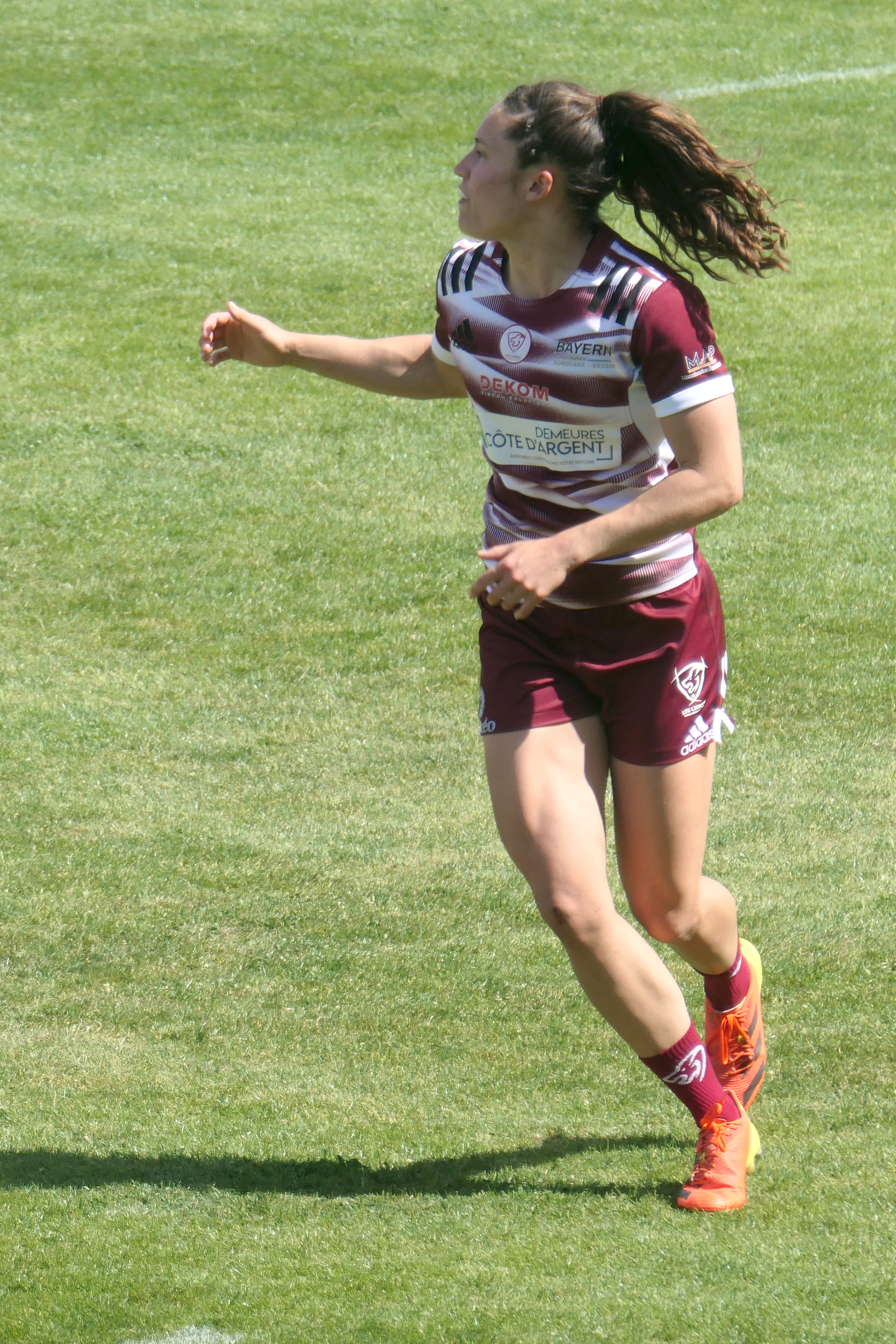
- Lloyd with Stade Bordelais in 2022
- Born: 17 October 1996 (age 30) Edinburgh, Scotland
- Height: 174 cm (5 ft 9 in)
- Weight: 67 kg (148 lb)

Rugby union career
- Position: Winger
Senior career
Years	Team	Apps	(Points)
2018–2021	Loughborough Lightning		
2021–2025	Stade Bordelais		
2025–	Sale Sharks		
International career
Years	Team	Apps	(Points)
2016–	Scotland	62	(135)
National sevens team
Years	Team		Comps
2023	Great Britain 7s		
Medal record
Women's rugby sevens
Representing Great Britain
European Games
Gold medal – first place	2023 Kraków–Małopolska	Team competition

Rhona Lloyd (born 17 October 1996) is a Scottish professional rugby union player from Edinburgh. She has played in multiple Women's Six Nations Championships, including the 2021 Women's Six Nations Championship. She collected 25 caps for Scotland before the age of 23.

== Club career ==
Lloyd plays for Loughborough Lightning, alongside internationally recognised players including Emily Scarratt and England captain Sarah Hunter. The Daily Telegraph described her as a "try-scoring sensation" in November 2019, after she scored 10 tries in just six league appearances in the Tyrrells Premier 15s.

While at Edinburgh University, she played rugby for the women's team, winning the final of BUCs at Twickenham in her final year.

She captained Murrayfield Wanderers U18 to victory in the Brewin Dolphin Cup.

Ahead of the 2025–26 Premiership Women's Rugby season, she signed for Sale Sharks from Stade Bordelais.

== International career ==
Lloyd played sevens for Scotland Women U19 and U20 in season 2013/14. She made her full international debut against England in the 2016 Women's Six Nations opener at Broadwood Stadium.

Lloyd scored her first international try in the 2016 Six Nations finale against Ireland in Dublin and her second in the Rugby World Cup qualifier against Spain in Madrid in November 2016.

The wing contributed to Scotland Women's 15–14 win against Wales in the 2017 Women's Six Nations with a second-half try.

After a shoulder injury set back her progress in 2018 she returned to the starting line for the 2019 Women's Six Nations Championship.

Lloyd played in the 2019 South African tour, in which the Scottish team won two of its matches, playing for the first time in the Southern hemisphere.

She played in the 2020 Women's Six Nations Championship, which was disrupted due to COVID-19. She was also part of the squad for the 2021 Women's Six Nations Championship, alongside Loughborough Lighting teammates Rachel Malcolm, Leah Bartlett, Jenny Maxwell and Helen Nelson.

She was named in Scotland's squad for the 2025 Six Nations Championship. She was selected in the Scottish side for the Women's Rugby World Cup.

== Personal life ==
Lloyd began playing rugby after Scotland international player Sarah Quick came to her school in Edinburgh to lead a taster session. First taking up rugby at Tynecastle High School at age 16 as the only girl in her school playing rugby. She then worked her way through the age grades.

Outside rugby was in the top 100 in the UK at the 60m sprint.

She studied biomedical sciences at the University of Edinburgh and undertook a Masters at Loughborough University, while doing an analyst internship with British Athletics.

Lloyd also co-hosts a podcast titled “Women Who Sport” with Loughborough and Scotland team-mate Sarah Bonar. She has commented on the issues relating to body image for sportswomen: "I play a physical sport. You need to have some muscle behind you so it's getting over that mental block and embracing that. Now being strong is really cool. I want to be that role model that I didn't have."
