= Maisy Allen =

England international rugby union player

- Born: 21 September 2002 (age 24)
- Height: 164 cm (5 ft 5 in)
- Weight: 72 kg (159 lb; 11 st 5 lb)

Rugby union career
- Position: Flanker
Senior career
Years	Team	Apps	(Points)
2021	Gloucester–Hartpury		
2021–	Exeter Chiefs		
International career
Years	Team	Apps	(Points)
2023–	England		

Maisy Allen (born 21 September 2002) is an English rugby union footballer who plays for Exeter Chiefs Women and England. Her preferred position is flanker.

== Club career ==
Having played for Wimborne RFC, Oakmedians and Dorchester, as well as Dorset & Wilts and the Bristol Bears Academy, Allen made her debut in the Premiership Women's Rugby with Gloucester–Hartpury in February 2021.

Later in 2021, Allen joined Exeter Chiefs Women and helped the club reach the semi-finals of the PWR in the 2023–24 Premiership Women's Rugby season. However, the following season Allen was impacted by injury and Exeter Chiefs finished fifth in the league, missing the semi-finals. In 2025-2026, she was a try-scorer as Exeter again secured a place in the PWR semi-finals, having scored ten tries across 17 league appearances that season.

In August 2026, she joined Canterbury on a short-term loan to play in the Farah Palmer Cup in New Zealand.

== International career ==
Whilst at the Bristol Bears Academy, Allen was selected at age-group level for England in Rugby Sevens as well as the England women's national Under-20 rugby union team.

Allen made a try-scoring debut for the senior England women's national rugby union team as a substitute against Canada in September 2023, making her first start for the team against the same opponent the following week. She was part of England's victorious team at the 2023 WXV the following month in New Zealand. In January 2026, she was called-up again to train with the England team prior to the 2026 Women's Six Nations Championship.

== Personal life ==
Outside of her own rugby career, Allen has worked as a rugby coach at Exeter College in Devon.
