= Joia Bennett =

English rugby player (born 2004)

- Born: 6 October 2004 (age 22)
- Height: 1.79 m (5 ft 10 in)
- School: Oaklands College
- University: University of Middlesex

Rugby union career
- Position(s): Flanker; Number 8
- Current team: Saracens
Senior career
Years	Team	Apps	(Points)
2023-	Saracens		
International career
Years	Team	Apps	(Points)
2024	England U20		
National sevens team
Years	Team		Comps
2025-	Great Britain 7s		

Joia Bennett (born 6 October 2004) is an English rugby union footballer who plays for Saracens Women and the Great Britain women's national rugby sevens team.

== Club career ==
From Luton, Bennett attended Oaklands College in Hertfordshire, where she was part of the centre of excellence programme. She played rugby union with Old Albanian RFC in St Albans and signed a senior contract with Saracens Women in 2023. A back row forward, she was part of the Allianz Cup-winning Saracens side in 2024. She signed a new contract with Saracens in 2025.

== International career ==
In Jun 2024, Bennett was included in the England Rugby Women’s Pathway squad for the inaugural Six Nations Women’s Summer Series. Bennett then also played for the England U20 team at the 2025 Six Nations Women’s Summer Series. Her efforts included a player of the match performance and a try in a 31-17 win against Scotland.

She was named in the Great Britain women's national rugby sevens team for the 2025-26 SVNS.

== Personal life ==
She studied for a Biochemical Science degree at Middlesex University.
