= Megan Jones (rugby union) =

English rugby union and sevens player

Megan Jones MBE
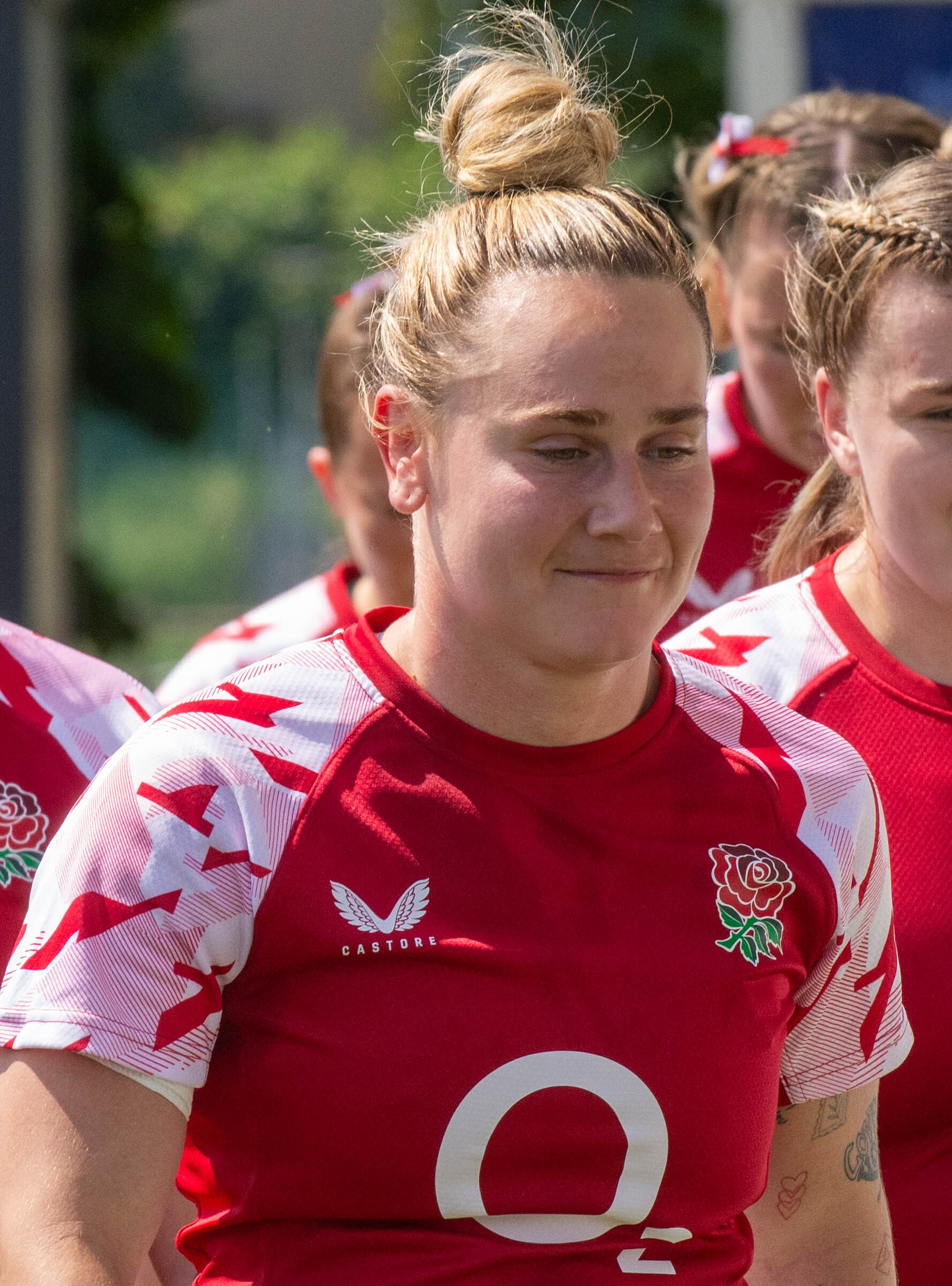
- Jones with England in 2026
- Born: 23 October 1996 (age 30) Cardiff, Wales
- Height: 160 cm (5 ft 3 in)
- Weight: 67 kg (148 lb)

Rugby union career
- Position(s): Fly-half, Centre
Senior career
Years	Team	Apps	(Points)
–2020	Bristol		
2020–2023	Wasps		
2023-2025	Leicester Tigers		
2025–	Ealing Trailfinders		
International career
Years	Team	Apps	(Points)
2015–	England	33	(69)
National sevens teams
Years	Team		Comps
2017–	England		
2021 (Note: Included numerous matches played at the 2021 Dubai Sevens event in the 2021–22 Women's Sevens Series.)	Great Britain		
Medal record
Representing England
Women's rugby union
Rugby World Cup
Gold medal – first place	2025 England	Team competition
Silver medal – second place	2017 Ireland	Team competition
Women's rugby sevens
Commonwealth Games
Bronze medal – third place	2018 Gold Coast	Team competition
Representing Great Britain
Women's rugby sevens
European Games
Gold medal – first place	2023 Kraków–Małopolska	Team competition

Megan Elizabeth Jones MBE (born 23 October 1996) is a British rugby union player who plays for England at international level. She debuted for England against New Zealand in 2015. She plays for Ealing Trailfinders at club level.

== Club career ==
Jones played for Bristol Bears Women until she signed for Wasps Ladies in 2020, where she played as a fly-half and a centre. In 2022, she signed for Premiership Club Leicester Tigers, where she remained until the start of the 2025/26 season when she joined Ealing Trailfinders.

== International career ==
Jones travelled to the 2016 Olympic Games in Rio de Janeiro as a non-playing reserve for Team GB sevens.

Jones is bilingual in Welsh and English and lived in Wales until she moved to England aged 16, and was qualified to play for both countries. She made her XVs debut for England in July 2015, playing against New Zealand in the Rugby Super Series that year. She then played off the bench in England's 39–6 win over Canada in the Old Mutual Wealth Series.

She was named in the England squad for the 2017 Women's Rugby World Cup in Ireland, where she scored the side's opening try (against Spain). She also played in the semi-final versus France and started in the final.

Also in 2017, Jones played in the first two matches of the 2017 International Women's Rugby Series playing at outside centre and inside centre. In late 2017, Jones joined the England Sevens programme full time. The England Sevens men and women's teams were made redundant in August 2020.

In 2021, she returned to rugby XVs as an invitational player for England in the 2021 Women's Six Nations Championship.

In June 2024, she was named in the British squad for the 2024 Paris Olympics. The team finished seventh.

She was named in England's squad for the Women's Six Nations Championship on 17 March 2025. She was named in the Red Roses side for the Women's Rugby World Cup.

== Early life and education ==
Born in Cardiff to an English mother and Welsh father, Jones was educated at Ysgol Gyfun Gymraeg Glantaf and began her rugby career at Glamorgan Wanderers aged six.

She moved to England aged 16 to study Sports Science and Management, and further her rugby career, at Hartpury College and went on to receive a BSc Honours in Sport Science and management from Loughborough.

During the 2020 COVID-19 lockdowns, Jones offered free online fitness sessions for children. She has also been coaching Barnes Women after being made redundant by the Rugby Football Union.

== Personal life ==
Jones is openly lesbian, and is in a same-sex relationship with her England 7s and Leicester Tigers teammate Celia Quansah. The couple represented Great Britain together at the 2020 Tokyo Olympics.

== Honours ==
England

- Women's Rugby World Cup
  - (gold) Champion (1): 2025
