= Isaac Fe'aunati =

Samoa international rugby union player

- Born: 23 July 1973 (age 53) Wellington, New Zealand
- Height: 1.89 m (6 ft 2 in)
- Weight: 107 kg (16 st 12 lb)

Rugby union career
- Position: No. 8
Amateur team(s)
Years	Team	Apps	(Points)
1994–1997	Marist St Pats		
Senior career
Years	Team	Apps	(Points)
1995-1996	Melrose		
1997-2000	London Irish		
2000-2001	Rotherham		
2001-2003	Leeds Tykes		
2003-2008	Bath		
Provincial / State sides
Years	Team	Apps	(Points)
1994–1997	Wellington	22	
Super Rugby
Years	Team	Apps	(Points)
1997	Crusaders	2	(0)
International career
Years	Team	Apps	(Points)
1996-2006	Samoa	13	(10)
Coaching career
- Years: Team
- 2008-2014: Bishop Vesey's Grammar School
- Relatives: Maddie Feaunati (daughter)

Isaac "Zak" Fe'aunati (born 23 July 1973) is a Samoan former rugby union player. He played as a number eight.

== Career ==
Fe'aunati was born in Wellington, New Zealand. In September 1995 he joined Melrose, debuting for the club in their 31–3 home victory over Hawick on 13 September 1995.

He retired from professional rugby in 2008 to take up a coaching position at Bishop Vesey's Grammar School on 2 June 2008. He also played Jonah Lomu in the 2009 film Invictus. In July 2014, Fe'aunati stepped down from his position at Bishop Vesey's Grammar School to return with his family to New Zealand.

== Personal life ==
He is the father of England international rugby player Maddie Feaunati.
