= Micke Günter =

South African rugby union

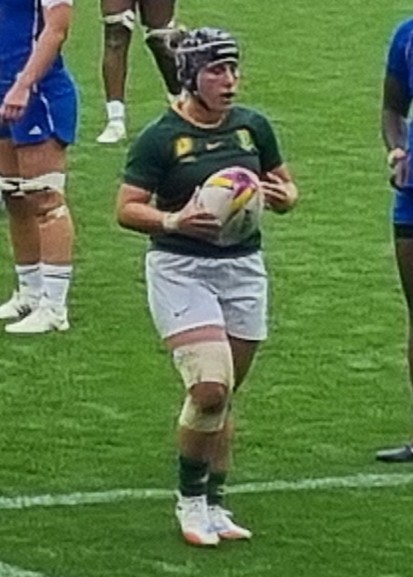
- 2025 Rugby World Cup in Northampton
- Born: 25 October 1998 (age 28) Durban, South Africa
- Height: 154 cm (5 ft 1 in)
- Weight: 75 kg (165 lb)
- School: Westville Girls' High School
- University: University of KwaZulu-Natal

Rugby union career
- Position: Hooker
- Current team: Leicester Tigers
Senior career
Years	Team	Apps	(Points)
2024–2024	Bulls Daisies		(0)
2025–	Leicester Tigers		(0)
International career
Years	Team	Apps	(Points)
2021–	South Africa	16	(5)
- Correct as of 14 September 2025

Micke Günter (born 25 October 1998) is a South African international rugby union player playing as a hooker.

== Biography ==
Micke Günter was born on 25 October 1998. She grew up in Durban, South Africa, and played a variety of sports during her school years: soccer, softball, and field hockey. She began playing rugby union in high school, initially hoping to become an international in rugby sevens.

She became a South African XV international in August 2021 against Kenya, and left the field injured after two minutes. However, she recovered in time and was selected for the Springboks' tour of Europe.

In 2022, she played for the Durban province of Natal Sharks. She had three caps for the national team when she was selected in September to play in the World Cup in New Zealand.

In 2023, after being crowned South African champion with the Bulls Daisies, she was selected for the first edition of the WXV, organized in South Africa.

Günter wins the title again with his province in 2024, then recalled with the Springboks for the 2024 WXV.

In 2025, as the Bulls win their third straight national title, She was injured in the South African Championship final and missed the South Africans' European tour. However, she was fit for the summer test matches against Canada. During the off-season, she signed with the English club Leicester Tigers.

She was named in the Springbok Women's squad to the 2025 Women's Rugby World Cup that is held in England.
