= Dan Murphy (rugby union) =

English rugby union player (born 1985)

- Born: 27 October 1985 (age 41) Romford, Havering, England
- Height: 1.91 m (6 ft 3 in)
- Weight: 119 kg (18 st 10 lb)
- School: St Joseph's College, Ipswich
- University: St Mary's University College

Rugby union career
- Position: Prop
Senior career
Years	Team	Apps	(Points)
2007–2011	London Irish	48	(5)
2011–2016	Gloucester Rugby	91	(40)
2016–2017	Harlequins	4	(0)
2017–	Hartpury University	61	(55)

Dan Murphy (born 27 October 1985) is an English rugby union coach and former professional rugby union player. His former clubs include London Irish, Gloucester RFC and Harlequins. He has held coaching positions at Hartpury University, Hartpury RFC and Gloucester-Hartpury. He was appointed Head of Rugby at Gloucester-Hartpury in April 2025, having previously served as their scrum coach.

== Early life ==
Murphy was born on 27 October 1985 in Romford, Havering. He was educated at St Joseph’s college, Ipswich and St Mary’s University, Twickenham.

== Playing career ==
Murphy started his player career at London Irish in 2007. He joined Gloucester Rugby for the 2011/2012 season. On 2 April 2013, it was announced that Murphy had signed a two-year contract extension to keep him at Gloucester until the end of the 2014–15 season. On 15 January 2015, Murphy signed a new three-year contract extension to stay with Gloucester until the end of the 2017–18 season.

However, Murphy announced he parted ways with Gloucester, after granted his early contract release, where he would officially join Harlequins from the 2016–17 season.

Murphy left Harlequins to join Gloucestershire based club Hartpury RFC in the RFU Championship from the 2017–18 season.

== Coaching career ==
Following his move to Hartpury, Murphy progressed into coaching roles across Hartpury's University men's rugby programme. He became head coach of Hartpury University's men's rugby team, winning the BUCS Super Rugby title in the 2024-25 season.

Murphy also worked as scrum coach for Gloucester-Hartpury in the PWR, and as defence coach for the Wales women's national rugby team during the 2025 Women's Six Nations. He was appointed Head of Rugby for Gloucester-Hartpury in 2025.
