= Alivia Leatherman =

US international rugby union player

- Born: August 9, 2002 (age 24)
- Height: 170 cm (5 ft 7 in)

Rugby union career
- Position: Prop
Senior career
Years	Team	Apps	(Points)
2024–	Trailfinders		
2025–	Twin Cities Gemini		
International career
Years	Team	Apps	(Points)
2023–	United States	10	(0)

Alivia Leatherman (born August 9, 2002) is an American rugby union player. She competed for the United States in the 2025 Women's Rugby World Cup. She plays for the Trailfinders in the Premiership Women's Rugby competition.

== Early career ==
Leatherman played rugby union in high school, she also participated in soccer and swimming. She played for her local club, the Parma Flamingos, before she joined the club at Notre Dame College.

== Rugby career ==
In 2022, she went on tour in South America with the national Under-23 team.

Leatherman made her international debut for the United States against Italy in the inaugural WXV 2 tournament in 2023.

In 2024, she played for Life West Gladiatrix in the Women's Premier League. By the end of summer 2024, she had accumulated five caps for the United States team when she was chosen for the WXV 1 tournament in Canada, although she did not play any games. She then joined the London club Ealing Trailfinders in the Premiership Women's Rugby competition. Trailfinders later extended her contract for the 2025–26 season.

Leatherman was named in the Eagles squad for the 2025 Women's Rugby World Cup in England.
