= Daisy Hibbert-Jones =

England rugby union player (born 2002)

- Born: 21 August 2002 (age 24) Birkenhead, England
- Height: 165 cm (5 ft 5 in)

Rugby union career
- Position: Flanker
- Current team: Loughborough Lightning
Senior career
Years	Team	Apps	(Points)
2019–2020	Waterloo	6	(0)
2020–2022	Sale Sharks	26	(15)
2022–	Loughborough Lightning	70	(70)
International career
Years	Team	Apps	(Points)
2021–	England	1	(0)

Daisy Hibbert-Jones (born 21 August 2002) is an English rugby union player. She plays for England internationally and Loughborough Lightning in the Premiership Women's Rugby.

== Early life and education ==
Daisy Hibbert-Jones was born on 21 August 2002 in Birkenhead, England. She was educated at Moulton College.

== Club career ==
Despite severe injuries early in her career (rupture of the anterior cruciate and medial lateral ligaments, tear of the meniscus at the age of 17), Hibbert-Jones joined the Sale Sharks, where in addition to her sporting activity she became involved in particular with children with Down syndrome.

In 2022, Hibbert-Jones joined the Loughborough Lightning. In 2023, by scoring a try in the seventh second of a match, according to the British specialist press, she broke the world record for the fastest try recorded.

In the 2024-25 season, Hibbert-Jones, who was named co-captain, became she the player in her club that accumulated the most playing time and received the title of best player of the season.

Ahead of the 2025–26 season, Hibbert-Jones was appointed sole captain of the Lightning.

Hibbert-Jones has also worked as a coach, first with the Northampton Saints and then at Moulton College.

== International career ==
After playing for the England under-20 team, Hibbert-Jones made her international debut with the England national team on 20 October 2023 in Wellington in a match against Australia.

In March 2026, Hibbert-Jones was named to the England squad that went on to win the Women's Six Nations Championship.
