= Olivia Apps =

Canadian rugby union and sevens player

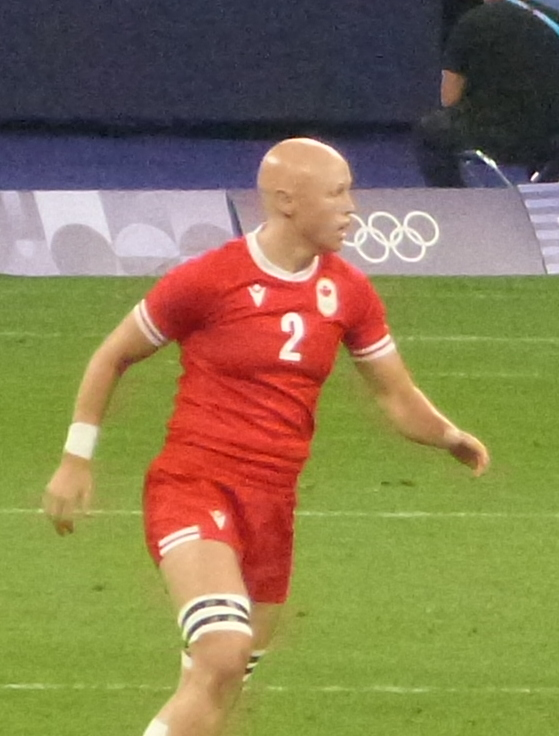
- Apps at the 2024 Summer Olympics
- Born: 1 December 1998 (age 27) Toronto, Ontario, Canada
- Height: 164 cm (5 ft 5 in)
- Weight: 70 kg (154 lb)

Rugby union career
- Position: Scrum-half
- Current team: Saracens
Senior career
Years	Team	Apps	(Points)
2025-	Saracens	10	(45)
International career
Years	Team	Apps	(Points)
2023–	Canada	25	(5)
National sevens team
Years	Team		Comps
2018-	Canada		
Medal record
Women's rugby sevens
Representing Canada
Event	1st	2nd	3rd
Olympic Games	0	1	0
World Cup	0	1	0
Total	0	2	0
Olympic Games
Silver medal – second place	2024 Paris	Team competition
World Cup
Silver medal – second place	2025 England	Team competition

Olivia Johanna Mary Apps (born 1 December 1998) is a Canadian rugby player. She competes for Canada internationally in both union and sevens, serving as captain of the sevens side, and professionally for Saracens in Premiership Women's Rugby. Apps has played for Canada at the delayed 2020 Tokyo Olympics, the 2024 Summer Olympics, where she won a silver medal, and at the 2025 Rugby World Cup.

== Rugby career ==
Apps was part of Canada's 2018 Commonwealth Games team that finished in fourth place.

In June 2021, Apps was named to Canada's 2020 Olympic team as an alternate. In September 2021, following the Olympics, she was named Captain of the Canada Women's Sevens national rugby team.

Apps competed for Canada at the 2022 Rugby World Cup Sevens in Cape Town. They placed sixth overall after losing to Fiji in the fifth place final.

On 8 July 2023, she made her test debut for Canada's fifteens team against New Zealand at Ottawa. Her side went down 52–21. On 23 August 2023, she captained the Canadian Women 7s in the Starlight Stadium tournament when they qualified for the 2024 Summer Olympics.

Apps was chosen as captain for the 2024 Summer Olympics in Paris, France. The team won a silver medal, coming from 0–12 behind to defeat Australia 21–12 in the semi-finals, before losing the final to New Zealand. In November 2024, Apps was named to the World Rugby Women's Sevens Dream Team of the Year.

She was selected in Canada's squad for the 2025 Pacific Four Series. In July 2025 she was named to Canada's World Cup squad. Canada advanced to the tournament finals on September 27, 2025 against England, winning silver before a record-size crowd of 82,000 fans in Allianz Stadium, Twickenham.

Shortly after the 2025 Word Cup ended, Apps signed with Saracens and joined fellow Canadians Sophie de Goede, Alysha Corrigan, Gabby Senft, Paige Farries, Julia Omokhuale, and Laetitia Royer. She would go on to help Saracens to a PWR playoff berth, before being named PWR Player of the Season. The Saracens went on to win the 2026 PWR championship. In November 2026, Apps was one of 3 Canadians named top the Women's 15s World Rugby Dream Team of the Year.

== Personal life ==
Apps is the daughter of Alfred Apps and Danielle French. She was raised in Kawartha Lakes, Ontario, and was introduced to rugby in Grade 10 in Lindsay.

At seven years old, she was diagnosed with alopecia universalis. She began competitive rugby at age 15.
