= Sarah Parry =

English rugby union player (born 2005)

- Born: 21 October 2005 (age 21) Shrewsbury, England
- Height: 175 cm (5 ft 9 in)
- Weight: 80 kg (176 lb)

Rugby union career
- Position: Centre
- Current team: Harlequins Women
Senior career
Years	Team	Apps	(Points)
2022-2024	Worcester Warriors		
2024–	Harlequins		
International career
Years	Team	Apps	(Points)
- England U20

Sarah Parry (born 21 October 2005) is an English rugby union footballer who plays as a centre for Premiership Women's Rugby club Harlequins Women.

== Club career ==
Born in Shrewsbury, Parry made her debut for Worcester Warriors Women as a 17 year-old. She moved to Harlequins Women ahead of the 2024-25 season. Her performances included a try in Premiership Women's Rugby for Harlequins against Gloucester-Hartpury in March 2025. She was also a try scorer as Harlequins won their PWR Cup semi-final against Bristol Bears Women in 2025. In 2025-26, Parry was a regular starter for Harlequins. In May 2026, she was nominated for Premiership Women's Rugby breakthrough player of the season and was named in the Rugby Players' Association’s Under-23 Team of the Season.

== International career ==
In March 2025, she was called into the senior England women's national rugby union team for the first time, ahead of the 2025 Women's Six Nations Championship. In June, Parry was named in the Red Roses' World Cup training squad as well as for the England U20 squad the 2025 Six Nations Women’s Summer Series. In March 2026, she was called-up again for the England team prior to the 2026 Women's Six Nations Championship.
