= Katie Shillaker =

English rugby player (born 2004)

- Born: 18 March 2004 (age 22)
- Height: 1.67 m (5 ft 6 in)
- Weight: 67 kg (148 lb)
- School: Worthing College

Rugby union career
- Position: Wing
Senior career
| Years | Team | Apps | (Points) |
| 2022- | Harlequins | | |
International career
| Years | Team | Apps | (Points) |
| 2024- | England | | |
National sevens team
| Years | Team | | Comps |
| 2024- | GB 7s | | |

Katie Shillaker (born 18 March 2004) is an English rugby union player who plays for Harlequins Women, England Women and the Great Britain women's national rugby sevens team.

== Early life ==
She is from Burgess Hill in Sussex. She did ballet as a youngster.

== Club career ==
She was introduced to rugby at Burgess Hill RFC. She played at Horsham RFC and Worthing College before joining the Harlequins’ Centre of Excellence, making her debut for Harlequins Women during the 2021-22 season. She signed a new contract it's the club in July 2023.

== International career ==
In 2022, she featured for England U18s. She went on to play for England U20 in the U20 Six Nations in 2024, with her performances including a hat trick against Wales U20. That year, she was capped by the senior England national women's rugby union team.

She featured for the Great Britain women's national rugby sevens team at the Dubai Sevens in November 2024, part of the 2024-25 SVNS series. She was named co-captain of the British women's sevens team for the 2025-26 SVNS alongside Eloise Hayward, her performances including a try against Australia at the 2026 Hong Kong Sevens.
