= Kristin Bitter =

US international rugby union player

- Born: February 3, 2001 (age 25)
- Height: 165 cm (5 ft 5 in)

Rugby union career
- Position: Fly-half
Senior career
Years	Team	Apps	(Points)
2025–	Denver Onyx		
2025–	Leicester Tigers	3	(0)
International career
Years	Team	Apps	(Points)
2023–	United States	7	(0)

Kristin Bitter (born February 3, 2001) is an American rugby union player. She represented the United States in the 2025 Women's Rugby World Cup. She played for the Denver Onyx in the Women's Elite Rugby competition before joining Leicester Tigers in the Premiership Women's Rugby.

== Early career ==
A San Diego native, Bitter started playing rugby aged 16 and went on to play collegiate rugby for Dartmouth College.

== Rugby career ==
Bitter made her international debut for the United States against Spain in March 2023. She later made an appearance for the Eagles against Italy in the 2023 WXV 2 tournament in Cape Town.

In 2025, she joined the Denver Onyx for the inaugural season of the Women's Elite Rugby competition. In May, she signed with the Leicester Tigers in the Premiership Women's Rugby competition.

Bitter was named in the Eagles squad for the 2025 Women's Rugby World Cup in England.
