= Barney Maddison =

English rugby union player

- Born: Barney Maddison; 22 February 1989 (age 37) Hexham, Northumberland, England
- Height: 1.95 m (6 ft 5 in)
- Weight: 115 kg (18 st 2 lb)

Rugby union career
- Position: Lock/Blindside Flanker
Senior career
Years	Team	Apps	(Points)
2011–2016	Rotherham Titans	80	(5)
2016–2018	London Welsh	13	(5)
2016–2017	Ealing Trailfinders	33	(25)
2018–2020	London Irish	11	(5)
2020–2024	Ealing Trailfinders	46	(10)

Barney Maddison (born 22 February 1989) is an English retired rugby union player who is currently head coach for Trailfinders Women in the Premiership Women's Rugby.

He originally played for Rotherham Titans who were in the RFU Championship, making his first-team debut against Bedford Blues in a Championship match in September 2011. He captained the Titans during the 2015–16 season at Vallis Way.

Maddison's first season with London Welsh, scoring one try in 13 matches since joining from Rotherham Titans in 2016. In December 2016, Maddison left Welsh with immediate effect to sign an 18-month deal with Ealing Trailfinders in the Greene King IPA Championship, with the lock managing 1 try from 12 appearances in that time.

On 18 May 2018, Maddison left Trailfinders to sign for London Irish from the 2018–19 season. He made his debut against his previous club Ealing Trailfinders in a Championship match back in September 2018. On 4 July 2020, Maddison re-signed with Ealing Trailfinders on a long-term deal from the 2020–21 season.

In August 2024, Maddison was appointed head coach at Premiership Women's Rugby club Trailfinders Women.
