= Charlie Holland =

English footballer (born 2009)

Personal information
- Date of birth: 3 July 2009 (age 17)
- Place of birth: London, England
- Height: 1.80 m (5 ft 11 in)
- Position: Midfielder

Team information
- Current team: Chelsea

Youth career
- Chelsea

International career^{‡}
Years	Team	Apps	(Gls)
2024	England U15	4	(0)
2024–2025	England U16	10	(0)
2025–	England U17	2	(0)
- ‡ National team caps and goals as of 3 November 2025

Charlie Holland (born 3 July 2009) is an English professional footballer who plays as a midfielder for Chelsea.

== Club career ==
As a youth player, Holland joined the youth academy of Premier League side Chelsea, where he captained the club's under-14 team. On 8 July 2026, he signed his first professional contract with Chelsea.

== International career ==
Holland is an England youth international. During the autumn of 2025, he played for the England national under-17 football team for 2026 UEFA European Under-17 Championship qualification.

== Style of play ==
Holland plays as a midfielder. English news website Last Word On Sports wrote in 2026 that he "tends to operate in a deeper role as one of a pivot or the base of a three, he can play a bit further forward as a traditional central midfielder... likes to pick up the ball deeper and use his strong passing range to orchestrate play and try to fashion space for a line-breaking pass... has been praised for his vision to pick out a pass, his ability to hold onto the ball under pressure, his tackling, which he can do comfortably with either leg, and his ball carrying".
