= Abi Burton =

English rugby union player

- Born: 9 March 2000 (age 26) Leeds, West Yorkshire, England
- Height: 183 cm (6 ft 0 in)
- Weight: 78 kg (172 lb; 12 st 4 lb)

Rugby union career
- Position: Back row
Senior career
Years	Team	Apps	(Points)
	Gloucester-Hartpury		(-)
2020–2022	Wasps Women		(-)
2024–	Trailfinders		(-)
International career
Years	Team	Apps	(Points)
2025–	England	4	(10)
National sevens teams
Years	Team		Comps
2019–Present	England 7s		
2021–Present	Great Britain 7s		
- Correct as of 1 August 2021
Medal record
Representing England
Women's rugby union
Rugby World Cup
Gold medal – first place	2025 England	Team competition

Abi Burton (born 9 March 2000) is an English rugby union player who plays for Trailfinders Women. She represented Great Britain in rugby sevens at the 2020 and 2024 Summer Olympic Games.

== Early life and career ==
Burton was born in Leeds and lived in Castleford, West Yorkshire, the daughter of Halifax Panthers and Bradford Bulls player Danny Burton and his wife Sarah. Her twin brothers Joe and Oli Burton both played for Leeds Rhinos Academy before Joe signed for Bradford Bulls. She was educated in Featherstone and was a school friend of professional footballer Jamie Shackleton. She played rugby league at Oulton Raiders and rugby union at Castleford.

Burton studied at Hartpury College, where she captained the U18 Hartpury side that won the National Schools Sevens, and came third in the 2017 Sanix World Rugby Youth Invitational Tournament in Japan. After completing her A Levels at Hartpury College, Burton went on to graduate with a degree in Sport and Exercise Science from St Mary's University, Twickenham in 2023, having studied on a scholarship. In 2026, she was awarded an Honorary Doctorate in Sport by the university in recognition of her outstanding contribution to English rugby.

== Rugby career ==
Burton first played in the Premier 15s for Gloucester-Hartpury. She captained the England women's national rugby sevens team in the Kharkiv 7s, part of the 2019 Rugby Europe Women's Sevens Grand Prix Series. In September 2020, she joined Wasps Ladies.

In June 2021 she was confirmed in the Great Britain Rugby Sevens squad for the delayed 2020 Summer Games in Tokyo.

In May 2023 Burton was awarded the Blyth Spirit award by the Rugby Rugby Players Association.

In June 2024, she was named as a reserve for the British squad at the 2024 Olympic Games. She was drafted into the team during the tournament when Amy Wilson-Hardy was withdrawn on medical grounds. The team finished seventh.

After impressing for Trailfinders Women in the Premiership Women's Rugby she was called up to the England national women's rugby union team in January 2025, scoring two tries on debut against Wales. In 2025, she was part of the victorious England squad at the 2025 Rugby World Cup, starting the match against Samoa. During the 2026 Six Nations Championship she transitioned from flanker to playing second row for the national team. She featured in the final match of the championship against France as England extended their unbeaten run to 38 matches and won a fifth consecutive grand slam in the event. Burton was nominated for 2026 Women’s 15s Try of the Year for her try against Australia in the WXV Global Series on 12 September.

== Personal life ==
Burton had a period of ill health in 2022 with Autoimmune encephalitis spending 76 days in hospital including 25 days in a coma receiving plasma exchanges. She lost 3 stone (19 kg) in weight and had to learn to walk and talk again, had seizures, and was initially misdiagnosed as experiencing psychotic episodes.

== Honours ==
England

- Women's Rugby World Cup
  - (gold) Champion (1): 2025
