= Niamh Gallagher =

Irish rugby union player (born 2005)

- Born: 22 September 2005 (age 21) London, England

Rugby union career
- Position: Full back
- Current team: Trailfinders Women
Senior career
Years	Team	Apps	(Points)
2024-	Trailfinders Women		
International career
Years	Team	Apps	(Points)
2024–2025	Ireland U20		
2026-	Ireland		

Niamh Gallagher (born 22 September 2005) is an Irish rugby union footballer who plays for Trailfinders Women and the Ireland women's national rugby union team. Her preferred position is full-back.

== Early and personal life ==
Born in London to Irish parents, Gallagher attended St Edmunds Catholic Primary School in Enfield, St Anne's School and St Ignatius College, Enfield, before studying for a sports and exercise science degree at Brunel University.

== Club career ==
Gallagher played rugby union for Enfield Tigers, the girls' rugby side connected to Enfield Ignatians, and was capped at county level for Middlesex, and captained their Under-18 side. She later trained with the Wasps Centre of Excellence, the Thames Valley Centre of Excellence, Saracens U18s and later featured for Trailfinders Women having joined the club in 2024.

Gallagher made five appearances for Trailfinders Women in the 2024–25 season before becoming a more regular starter the following season. In May 2026, she was nominated for Premiership Women's Rugby breakthrough player of the season.

== International career ==
Gallagher featured for Ireland U20s in the 2024 and 2025 Six Nations U20s Championship, and also played for Ireland U21 in 2026.

In March 2026, she was called up to the senior Ireland team for the 2026 Six Nations Championships. She subsequently made her senior debut in the championship against Wales in May 2026.
