= Julia Omokhuale =

Canadian rugby union player (born 2001)

- Born: 9 July 2001 (age 25)
- Height: 1.80 m (5 ft 11 in)

Rugby union career
- Position(s): Back Row, Second Row
- Current team: Saracens
Senior career
Years	Team	Apps	(Points)
2023–2025	Leicester Tigers	19	(15)
2025–present	Saracens	0	(0)
International career
Years	Team	Apps	(Points)
2023–present	Canada	6	(10)
- Correct as of 27 September 2025
Medal record
Women's rugby union
Representing Canada
World Cup
Silver medal – second place	2025 England	Team competition

Julia Omokhuale (born 9 July 2001) is a Canadian rugby union player. She currently plays as a Back Row or Second Row player for Saracens in Premiership Women's Rugby, the top-flight competition of women's rugby union in England, and for Canada at international level.

== Education ==
Omokhuale attended the University of Calgary.

== Rugby career ==
Omokhuale first competed for Canada in November 2023 against France.

She signed for Leicester Tigers in January 2024.

She joined Saracens from Tigers ahead of the 2025-26 season.

On 15 August 2025, she was called up to the Canadian side to the Rugby World Cup in England.
