= Emma Uren =

English rugby union and sevens player

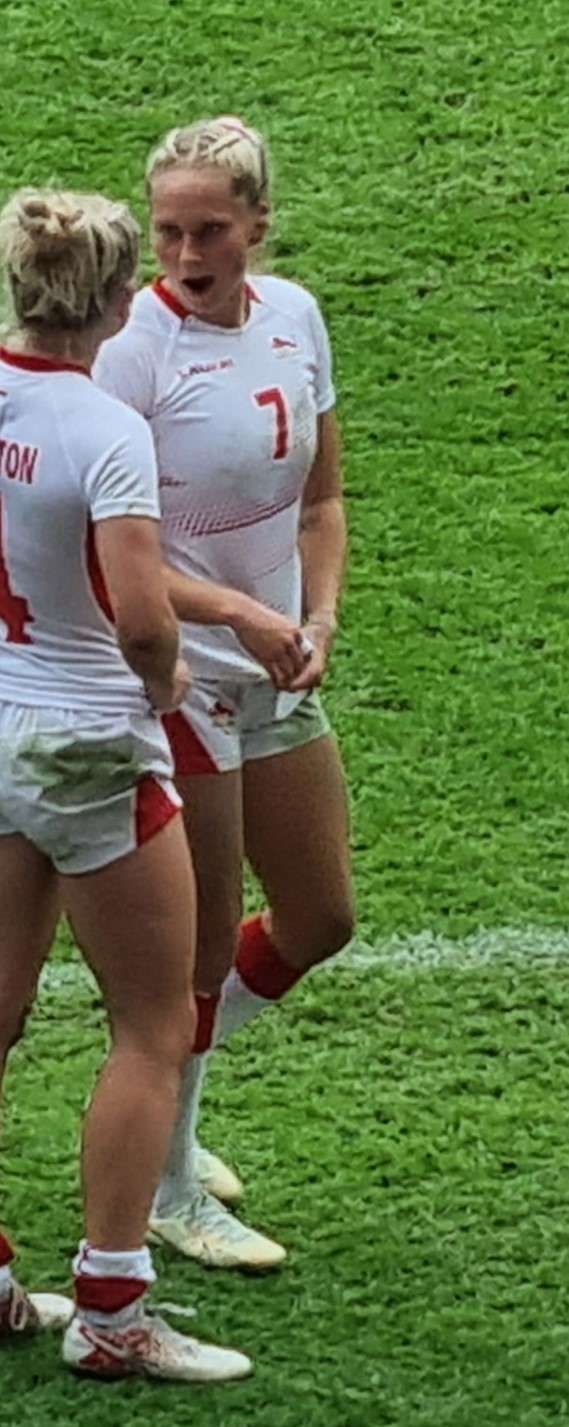
- Emma Uren at the 2022 Commonwealth Games
- Born: 1 October 1997 (age 29)
- Height: 1.72 m (5 ft 8 in)
- Weight: 68 kg (150 lb)

Rugby union career
Senior career
Years	Team	Apps	(Points)
- Saracens Women
2023-	Trailfinders Women		
National sevens teams
Years	Team		Comps
2019–	England		
2021–	Great Britain		
- Correct as of 01 August 2021
Medal record
Women's rugby sevens
Representing Great Britain
European Games
Gold medal – first place	2023 Kraków–Małopolska	Team competition

Emma Uren (born 1 October 1997) is an English rugby union player who plays for Trailfinders Women in Premiership Women's Rugby and Great Britain women's national rugby sevens team.

== Early life ==
Born in Chiswick and brought up in Twickenham, she played number of sports growing up, including netball for Middlesex. She was a swimmer in her teenage years and was coached by 2000 Olympic Games competitor Ed Sinclair. She first played for Richmond Borough, winning the London Youth Games aged 11. At Orleans Park School, she played rugby league before taking up union at 16 for Grasshoppers RFC in Isleworth. Uren was further educated at St Mary’s University, Twickenham, studying Strength and Conditioning Sciences. She split her final year of studies into two to take up a contract with the England women's national rugby sevens team.

== Club career ==
She played in the Premier 15s for Saracens Ladies but had to have surgery on a hamstring tear in January 2020. She signed for Trailfinders Women ahead of the 2023-24 Premiership Women's Rugby Season.

== International career ==
She captained England U20s to their first ever victory against France in France in March 2018.

In June 2021 she was confirmed in the Great Britain Rugby Sevens squad for the delayed 2020 Summer Games in Tokyo, helping the side finish in fourth place overall. She was named in the England squad for the 2022 Rugby World Cup Sevens – Women's tournament held in Cape Town, South Africa in September 2022. She was a selected as a member of the GB sevens squad for the 2023 European Games. Great Britain won a gold medal at the event and sealed qualification for the 2024 Olympic Games. In June 2024, she was named in the British squad for the Olympic Games. The team finished seventh.

She was named as captain for the Great Britain women's national rugby sevens team for the 2024-25 SVNS series which began at the Dubai Sevens on 30 November 2024.

== Personal life ==
Uren is the daughter of Jon and Lotta, a Swedish businesswoman from Stockholm who worked in the music industry before running a Swedish clog selling business. Her father is from Plymouth, and also worked in the music industry, where the pair met. She has a brother, Joey, who is also a rugby union player.
