= Tom Hudson (rugby union) =

English rugby union player

- Born: Tom Owen Hudson; 8 November 1994 (age 32) Newcastle upon Tyne, England
- Height: 1.85 m (6 ft 1 in)
- Weight: 95 kg (14 st 13 lb)
- Notable relative: Jack Hudson

Rugby union career
- Position(s): Centre, Wing, Fullback
- Current team: Ampthill
Senior career
Years	Team	Apps	(Points)
2016–	Gloucester	39	(20)
2021	Ampthill	1	

Tom Hudson (born 8 November 1994) is an English rugby union player who currently plays for Ampthill in the RFU Championship on loan from Gloucester in the Premiership Rugby.
