= Trailfinders Women =

English women's rugby union club, based in Ealing, London

- Full name: Trailfinders Women
- Union: RFU
- Founded: 2023; 3 years ago
- Ground: Trailfinders Sports Ground (Capacity: 5,000)
- Coach: Barney Maddison
- Captain: Kate Zackary
- League: PWR
- 2025–26: 4th of 9 (runners-up in play-offs)

First match
- Harlequins Women 31–21 Trailfinders Women (Twickenham Stoop, London); 30 September 2023

Largest win
- Trailfinders Women 64–33 Loughborough Lightning (Trailfinders Sports Ground, London); 13 October 2024

Largest defeat
- Saracens Women 80–14 Trailfinders Women (StoneX Stadium, London); 7 June 2026

Trailfinders Women are a professional women's rugby union club based in Ealing, Greater London. They currently compete in Premiership Women's Rugby, the highest division of women's rugby union in England.

== History ==
=== Amateur side ===
In the 2010–11 season, Ealing Trailfinders Rugby Club operated an amateur women's side, Ealing Jades Ladies, which competed in RFUW NC South East 1. They finished 7th place out of the 8 teams. The team did not appear again until the 2021–22 Women's NC 3 South East (Central) season when they were known as Ealing Trailfinders Ladies and they finished at the bottom of the table. In 2022–23, they competed in Women's National Challenge 3 South East (West) when they finished in 5th place.

After the founding of Trailfinders Women, Ealing Trailfinders Ladies changed names and became Ealing Women II. Trailfinders Women were founded as a new team.

=== 2023 onwards: Premiership Women's Rugby ===
In July 2022 Giselle Mather was named as Director of Women's Rugby at Ealing Trailfinders. The club then announced in December 2022 that it had been granted a license by the RFU to join the Premier 15s (later renamed to Premiership Women's Rugby) starting in the 2023–24 season. The full coaching staff for the club was named later that month. The clubs first signing was England wing Abby Dow. Other notable signings for Ealing's inaugural season included Ireland international Emma Swords and Italy prop Sara Seye.

Ealing's first ever win in the league came in a 36–7 victory over Leicester Tigers Women.

== Current players ==
The Ealing Trailfinders squad for the 2024–25 season is:

Note: Flags indicate national union under World Rugby eligibility rules. Players may hold more than one non-World Rugby nationality.

Player	Position	Union
Liz Crake	Prop	England
Mica Evans	Prop	England
Kira Leat	Prop	England
Alivia Leatherman	Prop	United States
Kaylee McHugh	Prop	England
Sara Seye	Prop	Italy
Andrea Stock	Prop	Ireland
Kie Tamai	Prop	Japan
Cassandra Tuffnail	Prop	Canada
Christina Blanco	Hooker	Spain
Rosie Dobson	Hooker	England
Kat Evans	Hooker	Wales
Lindelwa Gwala	Hooker	South Africa
Eloise Harris	Hooker	England
Amanda McQuade	Hooker	Ireland
Hannah Owen	Hooker	England
Alicia Watkins	Hooker	England
Tyson Beukeboom	Lock	Canada
Amelia Buckland-Hurry	Lock	England
Rowena Burnfield	Lock	England
Shya Pinnock	Lock	England
Emma Taylor	Lock	Canada
Charlie Willett	Lock	Ireland
Megan Barwick	Back row	England
Cara Brincat	Back row	England
Abi Burton	Back row	England
Charlotte Cheshire	Back row	England
Fiona Cooper	Back row	Scotland
Shannon Ikahihifo	Back row	Ireland
Annabel Meta	Back row	England
Grace Moore	Back row	Ireland
Sally Williams	Back row	England
Kate Zackary	Back row	United States

Player	Position	Union
Ella Amory	Scrum-half	Belgium
Brooke Bradley	Scrum-half	England
Caity Mattinson	Scrum-half	Scotland
Sophie Molton	Scrum-half	England
Sarah Denholm	Fly-half	Scotland
Julia Schell	Fly-half	Canada
Sam Shiels	Fly-half	England
Kendra Cousineau	Centre	Canada
Carys Cox	Centre	Wales
Ellie Lennon	Centre	England
Lisa Thomson	Centre	Scotland
Amy Wilson-Hardy	Centre	England
Ellie Boatman	Wing	England
Jess Cooksey	Wing	England
Liz Musgrove	Wing	Scotland
Emma Uren	Wing	England
Grace White	Wing	England
Hollie Williamson	Wing	England
Niamh Gallagher	Fullback	Ireland
Rosie Inman	Fullback	England
Vicky Laflin	Fullback	England
Chloe Rollie	Fullback	Scotland

== Season summaries ==
	League				Cup	
Season	Competition	Final position	Points	Play-offs	Competition	Performance
2023—24	Allianz Premiership Women's Rugby	6th	29		Allianz Cup	7th

Gold background denotes champions
Silver background denotes runners-up
Pink background denotes relegated

== Club staff ==
The coaching staff for the 2023–24 season is:

Role	Name
Director of Women's Rugby	Giselle Mather
Forwards, Line-out and Breakdown Coach	Barney Maddison
U23s and Defence Coach	Oli Bishop
Assistant Line-out and Assistant Defence Coach	Pat Metcalfe-Jones
Scrum Coach	Brett Wilkinson
Skills Coach and Athlete Mentor	Kim Oliver
