= Sadia Kabeya =

England rugby union player (born 2002)

Sadia Kabeya MBE
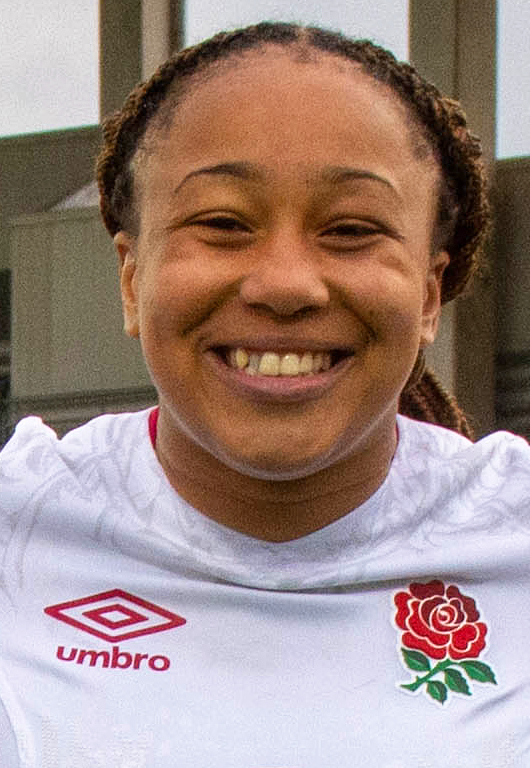
- Kabeya in April 2022
- Born: 22 February 2002 (age 24) London, England
- Height: 170 cm (5 ft 7 in)

Rugby union career
- Position: Flanker
- Current team: Loughborough Lightning
Youth career
- 2015–2019: Streatham-Croydon RFC
Senior career
Years	Team	Apps	(Points)
2019–2020	Richmond Women		(0)
2020–2021	Wasps Women		(0)
2021–	Loughborough Lightning	54	(80)
International career
Years	Team	Apps	(Points)
2019–2020	England U18		
2021–	England	28	(40)
National sevens team
Years	Team		Comps
2019–2020	England U18		
Medal record
Representing England
Women's rugby union
Rugby World Cup
Gold medal – first place	2025 England	Team competition7
Silver medal – second place	2021 New Zealand	Team competition

Sadia Kabeya MBE (born 22 February 2002) is an English rugby union player. She plays for England internationally and Loughborough Lightning in the Premiership Women's Rugby.

== Early life ==
Sadia Kabeya was born in the Lewisham area of London on 22 February 2002, the daughter of Lisa and Gilbert Kabeya. Her father is Congolese, whilst her maternal grandfather was Jamaican; her parents met after her father moved to England in his twenties. A talented teenage athlete, Kabeya was introduced to rugby as a student at Harris City Academy in Croydon, where her PE teacher was Bryony Cleall. She joined Streatham-Croydon RFC as a teenager and later attended Loughborough University.

== Club career ==
Kabeya first played for Richmond Women before moving to Wasps Women and then Loughborough Lightning.

== International career ==
In September 2019, Kabeya captained the England U18s in the Rugby Europe Women's U18 Sevens Championship.

She made her international debut for the senior England 15s team on 14 November 2021 against Canada. She played against Italy as England took the grand slam in the 2022 Women's Six Nations Championship.

In September 2021, Kabeya was named in the England squad for the COVID-delayed 2021 Rugby World Cup and started in the opening game against Fiji, where she was named Player of the Match.

On 17 March 2025, she was called into England's squad for the Women's Six Nations Championship.

She was named in England's side for the 2025 Women's Rugby World Cup. She was named Player of the Match for her performance in the final.

== Honours ==
England

- MBE (2026)
- Women's Rugby World Cup
  - (gold) Champion (1): 2025
