= Loughborough Lightning (rugby union) =

English women's rugby union club, based in Loughborough

- Full name: Loughborough Students Women Rugby Football Club
- Union: Rugby Football Union
- Nickname: Lightning
- Founded: 1970s
- Ground: Loughborough University Franklin's Gardens
- Director of Rugby: (Wales)
- Coach: (England) Nathan Smith
- Captain: (Scotland) Rachel Malcolm
- League: Premiership Women's Rugby
- 2025–26: 6th of 9
1st kit	2nd kit

Official website
- www.lightningrugby.co.uk

Loughborough Lightning are a women's rugby union club based in Loughborough, Leicestershire, England. They are the professional women's team of Loughborough Students RUFC and Loughborough University. Together with the netball team and the women's cricket team, the rugby union team is one of three women's sports teams based at Loughborough University that use the Loughborough Lightning name. In 2017, they were selected as a franchise for the inaugural Premier 15s season.

== History ==
LSWRFC were initially founded in the late 1970s during a boom in women playing rugby at universities across England. In 1983, Loughborough Students were one of the founder members of the Women's Rugby Football Union, set up to regulate women's rugby throughout the British Isles. Two years later, they hosted the American touring Wiverns rugby team and provided a number of players to the Midlands Select XV that played against the Wiverns on their tour. In 2009, Loughborough worked with the Nottingham Rugby Union in order to promote more men coming to Loughborough matches. When the British Universities and Colleges Sport rugby union leagues were formed in 2004, Loughborough won the league for the first three consecutive years.

In 2016, Loughborough Lightning bid for a franchise in the new competition originally known as Women's Super Rugby and now as the Premier 15s, which was replacing the Women's Premiership. A year later it announced that Loughborough Lightning were successful in their bid for a place in the top flight of English women's rugby. This made them the only student team that was awarded a franchise to play in the league. This was controversial as Loughborough Lightning had not previously played in the RFUW leagues and Lichfield Ladies who had been in the Women's Premiership for 15 years were excluded.

== Squad ==
The Loughborough Lightning squad for the 2025–26 season is:

Note: Flags indicate national union under World Rugby eligibility rules. Players may hold more than one non-World Rugby nationality.

Player	Position	Union
**Elis Martin**	Hooker	Scotland
Polly Peterson	Hooker	England
**Paige Stathopoulos**	Hooker	United States
**Kathryn Treder**	Hooker	United States
Tiwaa Adjei-Ansere	Prop	Germany
**Christine Belisle**	Prop	Scotland
Lucy Calladine	Prop	England
Grace Clifford	Prop	England
Isla Curphey	Prop	England
Churchy Knight	Prop	England
**Mae Sagapolu**	Prop	United States
Catherine Wells	Prop	England
Amelia Williams	Prop	England
**Anne Young**	Prop	Scotland
Kaya Acton	Lock	England
Tamsin Baynes	Lock	England
**Becky Boyd**	Lock	Scotland
Keevy Fitzpatrick	Lock	England
**Lilli Ives Campion**	Lock	England
**Tahlia Brody**	Back row	United States
**Rachel Ehrecke**	Back row	United States
Lucy Finch	Back row	England
**Daisy Hibbert-Jones**	Back row	England
**Sadia Kabeya**	Back row	England
Haineala Lutui	Back row	England
Ellie Roberts	Back row	England
Kendall Waudby	Back row	England

Player	Position	Union
Ashton Adcock	Scrum-half	England
**Leia Brebner-Holden**	Scrum-half	Scotland
Megan Davey	Scrum-half	England
Aoibhe Kelly	Scrum-half	Ireland
Alicia Maude	Scrum-half	England
Lia Green	Fly-half	England
**Helena Rowland**	Fly-half	England
**Alev Kelter**	Centre	United States
Molly Luthanyi	Centre	England
Carmela Morrall	Centre	England
**Helen Nelson**	Centre	Scotland
Ellie May Tromans	Centre	Wales
**Fancy Bermudez**	Wing	Canada
Evelyn Clarke	Wing	England
**Bulou Mataitoga**	Wing	United States
**Bo Westcombe-Evans**	Wing	England
**Abbie Brown**	Fullback	England
**Lucia Scott**	Fullback	Scotland

Note: Players listed in bold have received at least one senior international test cap.
