= PWR Cup =

English women's rugby union knockout cup competition

PWR Next Gen Cup
- Upcoming season or competition: 2026 PWR Next Gen Cup
- Sport: Rugby union
- Founded: 2021; 5 years ago
- Administrator: RFU
- No. of teams: 9
- Country: England
- Most recent champion: Saracens (2nd title) (2025)
- Most titles: Exeter Chiefs; Saracens (2 titles)
- Related competitions: Premiership Women's Rugby
- Website: www.thepwr.com

The PWR Next Gen Cup – officially known as the JAECOO PWR Next Gen Cup for sponsorship reasons – is an English women's rugby union knockout cup competition for teams that compete in Premiership Women's Rugby. It was created in 2021 to act as the league's equivalent to the men's Premiership Rugby Cup. It typically takes place in the international windows, giving more opportunities to inexperienced players.

== Format ==
For the 2025 edition, the PWR Cup uses a format where Premiership Women's Rugby clubs are divided into two pools based on their finishing positions in the previous Premiership Women's Rugby season. The competition is played over five rounds and each team will play every other team in their pool once.

The top two teams from each pool progress to the semi-finals, which are hosted at the venues of the highest-ranked clubs. These semi-finals are accompanied by a third-place play-off and a grand final.

== Finals ==
Ed.	Year	Winner	Score	Runner–up	Venue	Refs.
1	2021–22	Exeter Chiefs	57–12	Harlequins	Sandy Park, Exeter	
2	2022–23	Exeter Chiefs	29–19	Saracens	Sandy Park, Exeter	
3	2023–24	Saracens	31–17	Bristol Bears	Shaftesbury Park, Bristol	
—	2024–25	No competition due to 2025 Women's Rugby World Cup				
4	2025	Saracens	43–33	Harlequins	StoneX Stadium, London	

=== List of champions ===
Rank	Team	Champions	Years as champions	Runners–up	Years as runners–up
1	Saracens	2	2023–24, 2025	1	2022–23
1	Exeter Chiefs	2	2021–22, 2022–23	0	—
