= Leicester Tigers Women =

Women's rugby union club, based in Leicester, England

- Founded: 15 July 2021; 5 years ago
- Location: Leicester, England
- Ground: Mattioli Woods Welford Road (Capacity: 25,849)
- Coach: Tom Hudson
- League: PWR
- 2025–26: 9th of 9

First match
- Bishop Auckland Ladies 5–57 Leicester Tigers Women; 18 September 2022

Largest win
- Harrogate Ladies 3–114 Leicester Tigers Women; 18 February 2023

Largest defeat
- Saracens Women 100–0 Leicester Tigers Women (StoneX Stadium, London); 11 January 2025

Leicester Tigers Women is a women's rugby union club based in Leicester, Leicestershire, England. They are the women's team of Leicester Tigers. They were founded in 2021 and since 2023 have played in Premiership Women's Rugby.

== History ==
The team was formed on 15 July 2021, launched in partnership with Lichfield Ladies under the name of "Lichfield Leicester Tigers", in their initial season they played a season of friendlies before entering Women's Championship North 1 for the 2022–23 season, taking the place of Lichfield. The club confirmed its intention to bid for a place in the 2023-24 Premier 15s season. On 16 December 2022, the RFU announced that they had been successful and would join the Premier 15, which became Premiership Women's Rugby, beginning in 2023–24.

On 5 November 2022, the local derby with Loughborough RFC saw a record crowd for a 2nd division game as 3,523 attended.

The team's first ever top flight victory came against Sale Sharks Women on 21 January 2024.

Vicky Macqueen departed the club as head coach following the 2023–24 season, she was replaced by Tom Hudson for the 2024–25 season. In January 2025, it was announced that Hudson would leave his role as head coach after just one season in charge. In April 2025, it was announced that Fraser Goatcher was appointed as Director of Women's Rugby and Ross Bundy was appointed as Head Coach ahead of the 2025–26 season.

== Current squad ==
The Leicester Tigers squad for the 2023–24 season was:

Note: Flags indicate national union under World Rugby eligibility rules. Players may hold more than one non-World Rugby nationality.

Player	Position	Union
Caitlin Clark	Prop	England
Lisa Cockburn	Prop	Scotland
Georgie Grimes	Prop	England
Jade Jones	Prop	England
Churchy Knight	Prop	England
Ofure Ugiagbe	Prop	England
Alana Bainbridge	Hooker	England
Elis Martin	Hooker	Scotland
Samantha Williams	Hooker	England
Ella-Mae Fereday	Second row	England
Ali Gale	Second row	England
Maddie Massey	Second row	England
Georgia Westwood	Second row	England
Tanya Bird	Back row	Philippines
Sydney Mead	Back row	England
Leilah Mills	Back row	England
Becky Noon	Back row	England
Amy Orrow	Back row	England
Morgan Richardson	Back row	England
Kat Turner	Back row	England
Zoe Warrington	Back row	England

Player	Position	Union
Lucy Nye	Scrum-half	England
Ellie Turner	Fly-half	England
Holly Williams	Fly-half	England
Kristin Bitter	Fly-half	United States
Rebecca De Filippo	Centre	Wales
Abi Gordon	Centre	England
Linzi Taylor	Centre	
Tami Agboola	Back	England
Lottie Bozon	Back	England
Louisa Burgham	Back	England
Bryany Chalk	Back	England
Caz Collie	Back	Scotland
Charlotte Daley	Back	England
Molly Draycott	Back	England
Zoë Evans	Back	England
Tess Feury	Back	United States
Lucrezia Iavarone	Back	Italy
Harriet Roberts	Back	England

== Season summaries ==
	League				Cup	
Season	Competition	Final position	Points	Play-offs	Competition	Performance
2022—23	Women's Championship North 1	1st	90	Finalist	No competition	
2023—24	Allianz Premiership Women's Rugby	9th	10	-	Allianz Cup	9th
2024—25	Allianz Premiership Women's Rugby	8th	18	-	No competition	

Gold background denotes champions
Silver background denotes runners-up
Pink background denotes relegated

== Club staff ==
Role	Name
Director of Rugby	Fraser Goatcher
Head Coach	Ross Bundy
