= 2020–21 Premier 15s =

- Countries: England
- Date: 10 October 2020 – 30 May 2021
- Champions: Harlequins Women (1st title)
- Runners-up: Saracens Women
- Matches played: 83
- Top point scorer: (England) Zoe Harrison (Saracens) (105 points)
- Top try scorer: (England) Lark Davies (Loughborough) (20 tries)

Official website
- www.premier15s.com

The 2020–21 Premier 15s is the 4th season of the Premier 15s (22nd including editions of the previous Women's Premiership), of the top flight of English domestic women's rugby union competition and the first to be sponsored by Allianz.

== Teams ==
Club	Director of Rugby/Head Coach	Captain	Kit supplier	Stadium	Capacity	City/Area
Bristol Bears Women	(England) Kim Oliver	Daisie Mayes	Umbro	Shaftesbury Park	200	Bristol
DMP Durham Sharks	Aug - Dec Gordon Brett, Jan - May Rob Vickers	(Canada) Kenny Thomas	Macron (sportswear)	The Darlington Arena	25,500	Darlington
DMP Durham Sharks	Aug - Dec Gordon Brett, Jan - May Rob Vickers	(Canada) Kenny Thomas	Macron (sportswear)	Maiden Castle	N/A	Durham
Exeter Chiefs Women	(England) Susie Appleby	(Netherlands) Linde van der Velden	Samurai Sportswear	Sandy Park	13,593	Exeter
Gloucester-Hartpury	(Wales) Sean Lynn	(England) Natasha Hunt	Elite Pro Sports	Hartpury University Stadium	600	Gloucester
Harlequins Women	(Ireland) Gerard Mullen	(England) Rachael Burford	Adidas	Twickenham Stoop	14,800	Twickenham, Greater London
Harlequins Women	(Ireland) Gerard Mullen	(England) Rachael Burford	Adidas	Surrey Sports Park		Guildford, Surrey
Loughborough Lightning	(Wales) Rhys Edwards	(Scotland) Rachel Malcolm	Kukri Sports	Loughborough University Stadium	3,330	Loughborough, Leicestershire
Sale Sharks Women	(England) Darren Lamon	(England) Beth Stafford	Samurai Sportswear	Heywood Road	3,387	Sale, Greater Manchester
Saracens Women	(England) Alex Austerberry	(England) Lotte Clapp	Nike	StoneX Stadium (Note: Known as Allianz Park until Allianz ended their sponsorship after the men's season ended on 24 October 2020. When Saracens announced a partnership with StoneX Group Inc. on 10 January 2021, the stadium was renamed.)	15,000	Hendon, Greater London
Wasps Ladies	(England) Giselle Mather	(England) Kate Alder	Under Armour	Twyford Avenue Sports Ground		Acton, London
Worcester Warriors Women	(England) Joanne Yapp	(Scotland) Lyndsay O'Donnell	VX3	Sixways Stadium	11,499	Worcester

== Rule Changes ==
To reduce covid infection risk and close contact, several laws were introduced to reduce the number of scrums. These variations were reviewed after nine rounds and subsequently remained in place until the end of the season. These were:

- Free kicks are awarded in place of a scrum for a knock-on or forward pass
- Removal of the option for a scrum at a free kick or penalty
- Scrums advantages were shortened
- In a maul, the ball must be played at the first time of asking if the maul halts
- A maul can only be formed from a lineout if it takes place within the 22 metre areas
- No players who were not in the lineout may join the maul
- Game time is reduced to 35 minutes per half
- Water breaks at the midpoints of each half (players had to remain distanced)

== Table ==
2020–21 Premier 15s Table
Pos	Team	Pld	W	D	L	PF	PA	PD	TF	TA	TB	LB	Pts	Qualification
1	Saracens Women (RU)	18	15	1	2	650	254	+396	98	36	16	1	79 (Note: Saracens Women awarded 5 points for cancelled game against Harlequins Women)	Play-off place
2	Harlequins Women (CH)	18	14	1	3	631	181	+450	100	27	13	2	73	Play-off place
3	Wasps Ladies (SF)	18	14	0	4	648	268	+380	98	40	12	3	71	Play-off place
4	Loughborough Lightning (SF)	18	12	0	6	499	308	+191	74	46	10	2	60	Play-off place
5	Gloucester-Hartpury	18	10	0	8	433	339	+94	67	53	8	2	50	
6	Exeter Chiefs Women	18	10	0	8	403	314	+89	61	44	6	4	50	
7	Worcester Warriors Women	18	5	0	13	327	396	−69	52	59	6	2	28	
8	Bristol Bears Women	18	4	0	14	298	620	−322	46	93	3	3	22	
9	Sale Sharks Women	18	4	0	14	238	485	−247	32	70	2	1	19	
10	DMP Durham Sharks	18	1	0	17	96	1058	−962	10	157	1	0	5	

Source: "Fixtures and Results : Season 2020-2021". Englandrugby.com.

== Fixtures ==
Fixtures for the season were announced by the Premier 15s on 6 October 2020.

=== Regular season ===
==== Round 1 ====
10 October 2020
14:00

(1 BP) Saracens Women	34–25	Worcester Warriors Women (1 BP)
Try: P. Cleall 7' m Campbell 15' c Clark 30' m Lingham (2) 46' c, 68' m Clapp 65' m Con: Harrison (2) 15', 46'	Report	Try: Cox 12' c Heeley 24' m Laflin 42' m Phillips 50' m Con: Wilkins 13'; Pen: Wilkins 5'

Allianz Park

10 October 2020
14:30

(1 BP) Gloucester-Hartpury	34–14	Exeter Chiefs Women
Try: Smith 18' m Bonar 25' m Aldcroft (2) 42' c, 73' m H. Jones 55' m Fahey 60' m Con: Underwood 42'	Report	Try: van der Velden 32' c Zackary 58' c Con: Cattell (2) 32', 58'

Hartpury University Stadium

10 October 2020
15:00

Sale Sharks Women	7–29	Loughborough Lightning (1 BP)
Try: Delaney 12' c Con: Daley-McLean 12'	Report	Try: Jones 9' c Davies (2) 63' m, 66' c Richmond 69' m Con: Rowland (3) 9', 66', 69'; Pen: Rowland 18'

Heywood Road

10 October 2020
16:00

(1 BP) Harlequins Women	103–0	DMP Durham Sharks
Try: Cokayne 3' m Cornborough 9' c Konkel (2) 13' c, 40' m Packer 17' m Breach (2) 20' m, 57' c Beckett 32' m Cowell (2) 34' m, 53' m Rollie 37' c Brown 42' c Scott 44' m Ward (3) 45' c, 55' c, 69' c Wilcock 47' c Con: Scott (3) 10', 14', 37'; Tuima 43'; Green (5) 46', 48', 56', 58', 70'	Report

Twickenham Stoop

31 October 2020
14:00

Bristol Bears Women	10–64	Wasps Ladies (1 BP)
Try: Settembri 55' m Coles 69'	Report	Try: Burton (2) 1' c, 14' m Boatman (2) 10' c, 63' c Alder 20' m, 35' c Crake 26' c Jones 28' c Ransley 51' m Muir 60' c Con: Jones (7) 1', 11', 27', 28', 35', 60', 63'

Shaftesbury Park

==== Round 2 ====
17 October 2020
12:00

(2 BP) Exeter Chiefs Women	22–24	Bristol Bears Women (1 BP)
Try: Black 2' m van der Velden 49' c Leatherland 67' m Zackary 70' m Con: Cattell 50'	Report	Try: Reed 4' m Pam 21' c Bern 26' c Joyce 42' c Con: Reed (3) 4', 22', 27'

Sandy Park

17 October 2020
14:00

(1 BP) Loughborough Lightning	32–26	Gloucester-Hartpury (2 BP)
Try: Wyrwas (2) 14' c, 27' m Davies 51' c Menin 66' c Con: Rowland (3) 15', 52', 66'; Pen: Rowland (2) 44', 55'	Report	Try: H. Jones 17' m Powell-Hughes 41' c Venner 57' m Wood 70' c Con: Hunt (2) 18', 41'; Sing 70'

Loughborough University

17 October 2020
14:00

Wasps Ladies	12–31	Harlequins Women (1 BP)
Try: Kildunne 2' c Dow 15' m Con: Jones 3'	Report	Try: Cokayne 11' c Ward (2) 33' c, 59' m Brown 46' c Beckett 55' m Con: Green (3) 12', 34', 47'

Twyford Avenue

17 October 2020
15:00

Sale Sharks Women	10–40	Saracens Women (1 BP)
Try: Hall (2) 9' m, 16' m	Report	Try: Miell 2' c Campbell 19' c P. Cleall 32' c Packer 46' c Clapp 57' m Harrison 70' c Con: Harrison (5) 2', 19', 32', 46', 70'

Heywood Road

17 October 2020
16:00

DMP Durham Sharks	5–58	Worcester Warriors Women (1 BP)
Try: Dewar 36' m	Report	Try: Bricknell 6' m Heeley (2) 12' m, 60' m Matthews 14' c Shekells 23' m Kershaw 26' m Penalty try 40'; Wilkins 46' m Rawbone 65' m Laflin 68' c Con: Nicholas 15'; Wilkins 68'

The Darlington Arena

==== Round 3 ====
24 October 2020
14:00

(1 BP) Bristol Bears Women	5–12	Loughborough Lightning
Try: Martin 70' m	Report	Try: Davies 6' m Hardy 10' c Con: Rowland 11'

Shaftesbury Park

24 October 2020
14:00

(1 BP) Harlequins Women	33–14	Exeter Chiefs Women
Try: Beckett 5' c Brown 11' c Cornborough 20' c Tuima 36' m Packer 50' c Con: Green (4) 6', 12', 20', 51'	Report	Try: DeMerchant 62' c Armstrong 70' c Con: Cattell (2) 63', 70'

Surrey Sports Park

24 October 2020
14:00

Worcester Warriors Women	7–22	Wasps Ladies
Try: Callender; Con: Foxwell 66'	Report	Try: Kerr 4' c West 42' c Kildunne 62' m Con: Jones (2) 5', 43'; Pen: Jones 37'

Sixways

24 October 2020
15:00

(1 BP) Saracens Women	72–0	DMP Durham Sharks
Try: T. Taylor (2) 7' m, 19' c Packer 27' m P. Cleall 31' m Campbell 42' c Fleming (2) 54' c, 70' c Clark (2) 55' c, 67' m Casey 60' m Uren (2) 65' m, 70' +2 c Con: Harrison (2) 19', 42'; Aitchison (4) 54', 55', 70', 70' +2	Report

Allianz Park

21 November 2020
14:30

Gloucester-Hartpury	17–14	Sale Sharks Women (1 BP)
Try: Lewis 4' c H. Jones 55' c Con: George 4'; Fahey 55'; Pen: George 30'	Report	Try: Perrin 15' c Field 25' c Con: Wooden (2) 15', 25'

Hartpury University Stadium

==== Round 4 ====
7 November 2020
14:00

(1 BP) Loughborough Lightning	24–33	Harlequins Women (1 BP)
Try: Lloyd (2) 27' m, 57' c Scarratt (2) 68' c, 69' m Con: Rowland (2) 57', 68'	Report	Try: Brown (2) 16' c, 35' c Cokayne (2) 23' m, 48' c Fletcher 38' m Con: Scott (2) 17', 35'; Tuima (2) 39', 49'

Loughborough University

7 November 2020
14:00

(1 BP) Wasps Ladies	105–0	DMP Durham Sharks
Try: Boatman (3) 3' m, 32' m, 35' m MacDonald (4) 8' c, 30' c, 61' m, 70' c Dow (3) 10' c, 26' c, 68' c Kabeya 18' c Crake 21' c Cooney 45' m Mason (2) 57' m, 59' m Adefemiwa-Afilaka 66' c Con: F. Williams (6) 9', 11', 19', 22', 27', 31'; Jones (3) 67', 69', 70'	Report

Twyford Avenue

7 November 2020
14:30

Exeter Chiefs Women	19–7	Worcester Warriors Women
Try: Holland 20' c Tuttosi 41' m Delgado Duenas 46' c Con: Cantorna (2) 20', 46'	Report	Try: Foxwell 14' c Con: Foxwell 15'

Sandy Park

7 November 2020
14:30

Gloucester-Hartpury	5–43	Saracens Women (1 BP)
Try: Wood 11' m	Report	Try: Campbell (3) 22' m, 55' m, 68' c Hayward 24' c Penalty try 31'; Clapp 35' m G. Evans 37' c Con: Harrison (3) 24', 37', 68'

Hartpury University Stadium

7 November 2020
14:30

Sale Sharks Women	18–40	Bristol Bears Women (1 BP)
Try: Neumann 55' m Hibbert-Jones 61' c Con: Daley-McLean 62'; Pen: Daley-McLean (2) 8', 25'	Report	Try: Murray 5' c Powell 11' c Butchers 23' m Nielson 36' c Joyce (2) 39' c, 42' c Con: Snowsill (5) 7', 12', 37', 40', 43'

Heywood Road

==== Round 5 ====
14 November 2020
13:00

DMP Durham Sharks	6–31	Exeter Chiefs Women (1 BP)
Pen: Blacklock (2) 3', 20'	Report	Try: Delgado Duenas 12' c Mackinder (2) 26' m, 30' c Zackary 34' m García Rodriguez 48' c Con: Cantorna (3) 12', 30', 48'

The Darlington Arena

14 November 2020
14:00

Bristol Bears Women	3–28	Gloucester-Hartpury (1 BP)
Pen: Snowsill 10'	Report	Try: H. Jones 27' m Blackburn 33' m Fahey 45' m Bonar 65' c Con: George 66'; Pen: George (2) 5', 20'

Shaftesbury Park

14 November 2020
14:00

Worcester Warriors Women	8–20	Loughborough Lightning
Try: Mattinson 60' m Pen: Foxwell 43'	Report	Try: Brown 33' m Lloyd 36' m Hardy 54' c Con: Nelson 55'; Pen: Nelson 24'

Sixways

14 November 2020
14:15

(1 BP) Saracens Women	33–27	Wasps Ladies (2 BP)
Try: K. Evans 2' c G. Evans 5' c Fleming 16' m Clark 23' c Miell 32' c Con: Aitchison (4) 2', 5', 23', 32'	Report	Try: Molloy 38' c Burnfield (2) 64' m, 67' m Graham 72' c Con: F. Williams (2) 38', 72'; Pen: F. Williams 11'

StoneX Stadium

14 November 2020
15:00

(1 BP) Harlequins Women	31–0	Sale Sharks Women
Try: Packer 13' c Konkel 26' c Rollie (2) 51' c, 61' c Con: Green (4) 14', 27', 52', 63'; Pen: Green 32'	Report

Twickenham Stoop

==== Round 6 ====
28 November 2020
14:00

Bristol Bears Women	10–36	Saracens Women (1 BP)
Try: Pam 29' m Joyce 44' m	Report	Try: Gregson (2) 5' m, 47' m de Goede 7' c P. Cleall (2) 14' m, 67' m Campbell 39' m Con: Harrison (3) 7', 47', 67'

Shaftesbury Park

28 November 2020
13:00

Exeter Chiefs Women	14–24	Wasps Ladies (1 BP)
Try: García Rodriguez 15' c Hunt 25' c Con: Cantorna (2) 15', 25'	Report	Try: MacDonald 8' c Muir 30' c Kildunne 60' c Con: Jones (3) 8', 30', 60'; Pen: Jones 40'

Sandy Park

28 November 2020
14:00

(1 BP) Loughborough Lightning	57–3	DMP Durham Sharks
Try: Malcolm 4' c Jones 9' c Penalty try 23'; Davies 28' c Wyrwas 37' c Rowland 39' m Field 44' c Woosey 47' m Richmond 65' c Con: Rowland (4) 5', 10', 38', 45'; Goulden 66'	Report	Pen: Blacklock 50'

Loughborough University

28 November 2020
14:30

Gloucester-Hartpury	5–22	Harlequins Women (1 BP)
Try: Powell-Hughes 42' m	Report	Try: Konkel 12' m Tuima 37' c Brown 48' m Cokayne 56' m Con: Scott 37'

Hartpury University Stadium

28 November 2020
14:30

Sale Sharks Women	11–0	Worcester Warriors Women
Try: Wallace 26' m Pen: Daley-McLean (2) 47', 60'	Report

Heywood Road

==== Round 7 ====
5 December 2020
13:30

Wasps Ladies	21–10	Loughborough Lightning
Try: Millar-Mills 12' c Kildunne 36' c Dow 62' c Con: Jones (3) 13', 37', 63'	Report	Try: Lloyd 28' m Davies 35' m

Twyford Avenue

5 December 2020
15:00

(1 BP) Harlequins Women	61–17	Bristol Bears Women
Try: Brown (2) 4' c, 28' c Wilcock 32' c Cokayne 47' m Sommar 53' c Penalty try 60'; Cowell 62' c Packer 67' c Mayhew 70' c Con: Green (5) 5', 29', 33', 54', 63'; Tuima (2) 68', 70'	Report	Try: Joyce (3) 7' m, 42' m, 44' c Con: Snowsill 45'

Twickenham Stoop

6 December 2020
14:00

Worcester Warriors Women	7–15	Gloucester-Hartpury
Try: Harries 45' c Con: Nicholas 45'	Report	Try: K. Jones 5' c Wood 33' m Con: Fahey 6'; Pen: Fahey 1'

Sixways

30 January 2021
13:30

Exeter Chiefs Women	22–14	Saracens Women
Try: Leitch 11' c Zackary 39' m Johnson 65' c Con: Cantorna (2) 39', 65'; Pen: Cantorna 18'	Report	Try: Clapp 51' c Wardle 69' c Con: Aitchison (2) 51', 69'

Sandy Park

20 February 2021
14:00

DMP Durham Sharks	0–47	Sale Sharks Women (1 BP)
	Report	Try: Houghton 17' c Perrin 23' c Marzouq 36' c Perris-Redding 48' m Roberts 56' c Bawden 66' m Con: Daley-McLean (6) 18', 24', 33', 36', 57', 66'

Maiden Castle, Durham

==== Round 8 ====
12 December 2020
14:00

(1 BP) Bristol Bears Women	12–15	Worcester Warriors Women
Try: Mulhearn 29' c Joyce 50' m Con: Snowsill 30'	Report	Try: Harries (2) 24' m, 61' c Con: Nicholas 62'; Pen: Nicholas 65'

Shaftesbury Park

12 December 2020
14:30

Sale Sharks Women	8–30	Wasps Ladies (1 BP)
Try: Delaney 68' m Pen: Daley-McLean 28'	Report	Try: MacDonald 7' c Kildunne 13' m Wilson-Hardy 33' m Crake 39' c Con: Jones (2) 8', 39'; Pen: Jones 48'

Heywood Road

12 December 2020
15:00

Loughborough Lightning	14–7	Exeter Chiefs Women (1 BP)
Try: Lloyd 33' c Davies 39' c Con: Scarratt (2) 34', 39'	Report	Try: Hunt 25' c Con: Cantorna 26'

Loughborough University

20 February 2021
14:00

Harlequins Women	Cancelled; 0–0 (Note: Cancelled due a to breach of COVID protocols by Harlequins, with Saracens awarded the win and 5 league points.)	Saracens Women (1 BP)

Surrey Sports Park

13 March 2021
14:30

(1 BP) Gloucester-Hartpury	74–7	DMP Durham Sharks
Try: Tandy (3) 1' c, 33' m, 40' c Fahey 5' c Sing (2) 9' c, 37' m Lund 12' c Wood (2) 22' m, 50' m Underwood (2) 64' c, 66' m Con: Sing (6) 3', 7', 11', 13', 41', 65'	Report	Try: Layzell 57' c Con: Cookland 58'

Hartpury University Stadium

==== Round 9 ====
19 December 2020
13:30

DMP Durham Sharks	3–50	Bristol Bears Women (1 BP)
Pen: Blacklock 55'	Report	Try: Keight 4' c Butchers (2) 14' c, 46' c Murray (2) 23' m, 37' m Burgess 26' c Pam 48' c Powell 50' m Con: Snowsill (5) 4', 15', 27', 47', 48'

The Darlington Arena

19 December 2020
14:00

(1 BP) Exeter Chiefs Women	38–0	Sale Sharks Women
Try: van der Velden 15' c Kato 31' m Mackinder 38' m Hunt 55' c Powell 59' c Zackary 68' c Con: Cantorna (4) 15', 55', 59', 68'	Report

Sandy Park

19 December 2020
14:00

(1 BP) Saracens Women	29–24	Loughborough Lightning (1 BP)
Try: Clapp 6' m Harrison 14' c Packer 37' m Campbell 37' m de Goede 51' c Con: Harrison (2) 14', 51'	Report	Try: Davies (2) 9' c, 17' c Lloyd 30' c Con: Scarratt (3) 9', 17', 30'; Pen: Scarratt 26'

StoneX Stadium

19 December 2020
13:30

(1 BP) Wasps Ladies	29–17	Gloucester-Hartpury
Try: Muir 2' c Dow 19' m C. Williams 29' c Kildunne 40' c Con: Jones (3) 3', 30', 41'; Pen: Jones 60'	Report	Try: Powell-Hughes 34' c Blackburn 63' c Con: George (2) 35', 64'; Pen: George 17'

Twyford Avenue

20 December 2020
14:00

Worcester Warriors Women	12–24	Harlequins Women (1 BP)
Try: Harries 40' m Brincat 58' c Con: Wilkins 58'	Report	Try: Cowell 14' m Riley 23' c Breach (2) 33' c, 36' c Con: Scott 24'; Tuima 36'

Sixways

==== Round 10 ====
9 January 2021
12:00

(1 BP) Bristol Bears Women	27–31	Exeter Chiefs Women (1 BP)
Try: Joyce (3) 11' c, 17' c, 51' c Con: Snowsill (3) 12', 18', 52'; Pen: Snowsill (2) 24', 57'	Report	Try: van der Velden 6' c Jefferies 20' c Delgado Duenas 30' m Tuttosi 56' c Mackidner 64' m Con: Cantorna (3) 6', 21', 57'

Shaftesbury Park

9 January 2021
14:00

(1 BP) Worcester Warriors Women	70–6	DMP Durham Sharks
Try: Harries (4) 1' m, 35' c, 41' m, 53' m Farries (2) 8' c, 16' c Phillips (2) 26' m, 30' c Thomas 39' m Bluck 43' m Bradley 43' m Wright-Haley 65' c Con: Wilkins (5) 8', 16', 30', 35', 65'	Report	Pen: Blacklock (2) 6', 13'

Sixways

9 January 2021
14:30

Gloucester-Hartpury	21–29	Loughborough Lightning (1 BP)
Try: Pinnock 2' c Penalty try 25'; Wood 60' c Con: Fahey 2'; Sing 60'	Report	Try: Davies (2) 7' c, 50' c Trevarthen 37' m Lloyd 40' m Holtkamp 55' m Con: Scarratt (2) 7', 50'

Hartpury University Stadium

20 February 2021
14:00

Harlequins Women	20–19	Wasps Ladies (1 BP)
Try: Cokayne (2) 8' m, 50' c Edwards 61' m Con: Green 51'; Pen: Tuima 67'	Report	Try: Cooney 4' m Muir 27' c Alder 40' c Con: Jones (2) 28', 41'

Surrey Sports Park

14 March 2021
14:00

(1 BP) Saracens Women	47–18	Sale Sharks Women
Try: P. Cleall (3) 2' c, 16' m, 20' c T. Taylor 5' c Uren 40' c Campbell 46' c Carson 62' c Con: Harrison (5) 2', 5', 20', 40', 46'; Martin 62'	Report	Try: Roberts 29' c Delaney 60' m Con: Daley-McLean 29'; Pen: Daley-McLean (2) 10', 25'

StoneX Stadium

==== Round 11 ====
6 February 2021
13:30

(1 BP) Wasps Ladies	40–3	Worcester Warriors Women
Try: C. Williams 24' c Crake 29' c Muir 37' c Quansah 42' c Dow 62' c Mitchelson 69' m Con: Jones (5) 25', 30', 38', 43', 63'	Report	Pen: Nicholas 9'

Twyford Avenue

6 February 2021
14:00

DMP Durham Sharks	3–73	Saracens Women (1 BP)
Pen: Blacklock 16'	Report	Try: Fleetwood 12' c P. Cleall (3) 19' c, 27' c, 37' c Campbell 32' c Miell 44' c G. Evans 49' c Clapp 55' m Clifford 62' c Corrigan 67' m Fleming 70' c Con: Aitchison (9) 13', 20', 28', 33', 38', 45', 49', 63', 70'

Maiden Castle, Durham

6 February 2021
14:00

Exeter Chiefs Women	7–6	Harlequins Women (1 BP)
Try: Hunt 2' c Con: Cantorna 2'	Report	Pen: Green (2) 10', 32'

Sandy Park

6 February 2021
14:00

(1 BP) Loughborough Lightning	42–14	Bristol Bears Women
Try: O'Donnell 19' c Menin 34' c Davies 39' m Lloyd 48' m Davey 52' m Brown 65' c Con: Scarratt (3) 20', 35', 66'; Pen: Scarratt (2) 30', 47'	Report	Try: Joyce 3' c Butchers 58' c Con: Snowsill 4'; Skuse 59'

Loughborough University

6 February 2021
14:30

Sale Sharks Women	7–26	Gloucester-Hartpury (1 BP)
Try: Neumann 64' c Con: Daley-McLean 64'	Report	Try: King 16' c K. Jones 34' c Underwood 38' c Blackburn 70' m Con: Fahey (3) 17', 34', 38'

Heywood Road

==== Round 12 ====
13 February 2021
14:00

Bristol Bears Women	22–12	Sale Sharks Women
Try: Burgess 23' c Powell 26' c Pam 52' m Con: Snowsill (2) 24', 26'; Pen: Snowsill 15'	Report	Try: Delaney 20' m Irwin 55' c Con: Wooden 55'

Shaftesbury Park

13 February 2021
14:00

(1 BP) Harlequins Women	17–20	Loughborough Lightning
Try: Cowell 20' m Duffy 35' m Ward 37' c Con: Green 38'	Report	Try: D. Harper 6' c Brown 13' m Con: Scarratt 7'; Pen: Scarratt 61'

Old Surbitonians Memorial Ground

13 February 2021
14:30

(1 BP) Worcester Warriors Women	10–17	Exeter Chiefs Women
Try: Shekells 29' m Phillips 51' m	Report	Try: Zackary 10' m Terry 26' c Mackinder 67' m Con: Cantorna 26'

Sixways

14 February 2021
13:00

(1 BP) Saracens Women	36–10	Gloucester-Hartpury
Try: P. Cleall (2) 22' c, 37' c Clark 40' m Clapp 58' c Fleming 63' m Con: Harrison 22'; Aitchison (2) 37', 40'; McKenna 58'; Pen: Harrison 29'	Report	Try: Smith 49' m Wood 67' m

StoneX Stadium

3 April 2021
14:30

DMP Durham Sharks	14–27	Wasps Ladies (1 BP)
Try: Blacklock (2) 65' c, 70' c Con: Blacklock (2) 65', 70'	Report	Try: Alder 4' m West (2) 21' m, 62' c Kabeya 29' m Boatman 48' m Con: Monaghan 62'

Maiden Castle, Durham

==== Round 13 ====
27 February 2021
12:00

(1 BP) Exeter Chiefs Women	76–5	DMP Durham Sharks
Try: Zackary 3' c Johnson (2) 8' c, 69' c Burgess (4) 16' m, 26' c, 30' m, 45' m Doidge (2) 19' c, 41' m Terry 34' c Black 38' c Cantorna 63' c Con: Cantorna (8) 3', 8', 19', 26', 34', 38', 63', 69'	Report	Try: Hunter 60' m

Sandy Park

27 February 2021
13:30

Wasps Ladies	26–24	Saracens Women (2 BP)
Try: Jones 5' m Dow (2) 42' m, 58' c Con: Jones 59'; Pen: Jones (3) 14', 30', 56'	Report	Try: Campbell (2) 8' m, 38' m Clark 35' c Packer 46' c Con: Martin (2) 36', 47'

Twyford Avenue

27 February 2021
14:00

(1 BP) Loughborough Lightning	43–14	Worcester Warriors Women
Try: Davies 16' m Scarratt 25' c Hardy 29' m Jones 39' c Duguid 49' c Meuller 63' m Rowland 67' c Con: Scarratt (4) 26', 40', 50', 68'	Report	Try: Shekells 34' c Cox 56' c Con: Shekells (2) 35', 57'

Loughborough University

27 February 2021
14:30

(1 BP) Gloucester-Hartpury	36–0	Bristol Bears Women
Try: Hunt (2) 3' c, 47' m H. Jones 12' m Smith 42' m Underwood (2) 60' m, 64' c Con: Fahey (3) 3', 12', 64'	Report

Hartpury University Stadium

27 February 2021
14:30

Sale Sharks Women	5–45	Harlequins Women (1 BP)
Try: Daley-McLean 66' m	Report	Try: Green 20' c Bloor 34' m Breach (3) 36' c, 55' c, 68' m Brown 59' c Ward 70' c Con: Green (2) 20', 36'; Tuima (2) 55', 59'; Scott 70'

Heywood Road

==== Round 14 ====
6 March 2021
14:00

(1 BP) Saracens Women	53–7	Bristol Bears Women
Try: Campbell (3) 3' m, 40' c, 67' c Uren (2) 16' m, 29' c de Goede 18' m P. Cleall 26' m Clark 34' c Harrison 42' m Con: Harrison (3) 29', 34', 40'; Martin 67'	Report	Try: Keight 9' c Con: Snowsill 10'

StoneX Stadium

6 March 2021
14:00

(2 BP) Wasps Ladies	29–31	Exeter Chiefs Women (1 BP)
Try: Quansah (2) 3' m, 18' c Wilson-Hardy (2) 13' m, 16' m Alder 56' c Con: Jones (2) 19', 57'	Report	Try: Hunt (3) 10' c, 26' c, 45' c Black 37' c Con: Cantorna (4) 11', 27', 38', 46'; Pen: Cantorna 67'

Twyford Avenue

6 March 2021
14:00

DMP Durham Sharks	0–62	Loughborough Lightning (1 BP)
	Report	Try: Richmond 10' m Jones (4) 18' c, 40' c, 52' c, 55' m Davies (2) 30' c, 43' m Meuller 46' m Goldthorp 55' m D. Harper 65' c Con: Scarratt (4) 19', 30', 40', 46'; Goulden (2) 52', 66'

Maiden Castle, Durham

6 March 2021
14:00

(1 BP) Harlequins Women	28–15	Gloucester-Hartpury
Try: Breach (2) 17' c, 68' c Cokayne 35' c Edwards 44' c Con: Green (2) 18', 35'; Tuima (2) 45', 69'	Report	Try: Hunt 1' m Lund 10' m Sing 47' m

Surrey Sports Park

7 March 2021
14:00

(1 BP) Worcester Warriors Women	31–21	Sale Sharks Women
Try: Tremelling 10' m Shekells (2) 21' c, 47' m Bricknell 43' c Bradley 65' c Con: Nicholas (3) 21', 43', 65'	Report	Try: Calton 7' c Fielding 27' c Elbeck 34' c Con: Daley-McLean (3) 7', 27', 34'

Sixways

==== Round 15 ====
20 March 2021
14:00

Bristol Bears Women	7–62	Harlequins Women (1 BP)
Try: Murray 57' c Con: Snowsill 57'	Report	Try: Edwards 5' m Riley (2) 14' c, 29' c Breach 18' c Penalty try 23'; Cokayne 39' m Ward 43' c Cowell 49' c Dainton 52' c Green 60' m Con: Green (6) 15', 19', 30', 44', 50', 53'

Shaftesbury Park

20 March 2021
14:00

(1 BP) Gloucester-Hartpury	28–24	Worcester Warriors Women (2 BP)
Try: Aldcroft (3) 1' c, 4' c, 35' c Smith 20' c Con: Sing (4) 1', 4', 20', 35'	Report	Try: Harries (3) 13' m, 23' m, 54' c Callender 45' c Con: Nicholas (2) 46', 54'

Hartpury University Stadium

20 March 2021
14:00

Loughborough Lightning	14–36	Wasps Ladies (1 BP)
Try: Davies (2) 27' c, 58' c Con: Scarratt (2) 28', 59'	Report	Try: Wilson-Hardy 5' c Moloney 22' c Dow (2) 30' m, 70' m Quansah 38' c Kabeya 61' m Con: Jones (3) 6', 23', 39'

Loughborough University

20 March 2021
14:00

(1 BP) Saracens Women	34–21	Exeter Chiefs Women
Try: Rose 9' c Clapp 53' c Fleetwood 58' c Campbell 67' c Con: Harrison (4) 9', 53', 58', 67'; Pen: Harrison (2) 7', 43'	Report	Try: Johnson (2) 22' c, 36' c Kato 30' c Con: Cantorna (3) 22', 30', 36'

StoneX Stadium

20 March 2021
14:30

(1 BP) Sale Sharks Women	31–3	DMP Durham Sharks
Try: Neumann (2) 4' c, 58' c Roberts 34' m Marzouq 35' c Ounsley 41' m Con: Daley-McLean (3) 4', 35', 38'	Report	Pen: Blount 19'

Heywood Road

==== Round 16 ====
27 March 2021
13:30

(1 BP) Wasps Ladies	50–0	Sale Sharks Women
Try: Crake (2) 10' c, 23' m Muir (3) 39' c, 45' c, 69' c Dow (2) 47' c, 65' m Boatman 57' m Con: F. Williams (4) 11', 40', 46', 48'; Kildunne 69'	Report

Twyford Avenue

27 March 2021
14:00

Saracens Women	17–17	Harlequins Women
Try: P. Cleall 19' c Campbell 51' c Con: Harrison (2) 20', 51'; Pen: Harrison 70' +1	Report	Try: Fletcher 46' c Riley 63' c Con: Green (2) 47', 63'; Pen: Green 24'

StoneX Stadium

27 March 2021
14:30

DMP Durham Sharks	7–38	Gloucester-Hartpury (1 BP)
Try: Dadds 15' c Con: Cookland 15'	Report	Try: Perry 5' c Smith 21' m Manns 25' m Powell 50' c Underwood 58' c Lock 61' c Con: Mundy 5'; Sing (3) 51', 59', 61'

Maiden Castle, Durham University

27 March 2021
15:00

Exeter Chiefs Women	17–12	Loughborough Lightning (1 BP)
Try: Johnson 11' c Sheehan 33' c Con: Cantorna (2) 11', 33'; Pen: Cantorna 6'	Report	Try: Davey 50' c Rowland 70' +3 m Con: Scarratt 50'

Sandy Park

28 March 2021
14:00

(1 BP) Worcester Warriors Women	29–21	Bristol Bears Women
Try: Tremelling (3) 4' m, 34' c, 52' c Shekells 6' m Farries 18' m Con: Nicholas (2) 34', 52'	Report	Try: Lockwood 42' c Smyth 45' c Pam 59' c Con: Snowsill (3) 42', 45', 59'

Sixways

==== Round 17 ====
17 April 2021
13:00

(1 BP) Harlequins Women	31–7	Worcester Warriors Women
Try: Eddie 8' m Aucken 12' m Packer 43' c Wilcock 54' c Dobson 70' m Scott 71' m Con: Scott 44'; Wilcock 55'	Report	Try: Farries 5' c Con: Nicholas 6'

Surrey Sports Park

17 April 2021
13:00

Bristol Bears Women	17–34	DMP Durham Sharks (1 BP)
Try: Nielsen 5' c Martin 16' m Marston 47' m Con: Smyth 6'	Report	Try: Blount 20' c Blacklock (2) 27' c, 33' c Layzell 32' c Roberts 50' c Con: Blacklock (4) 21', 28', 33', 51'; Pen: Blacklock (2) 10', 62'

Shaftesbury Park

17 April 2021
13:00

(1 BP) Loughborough Lightning	29–38	Saracens Women (1 BP)
Try: Field (3) 5' c, 39' c, 49' c Goldthorp 60' m Con: Goulden (3) 6', 40', 50'; Pen: Goulden 44'	Report	Try: Clark 22' c Lingham 26' c E. Taylor 31' m de Goede (2) 36' c, 56' c Laqeretabua 65' m Con: de Goede (4) 23', 27', 37', 57'

Loughborough University

17 April 2021
13:00

(1 BP) Gloucester-Hartpury	20–25	Wasps Ladies (1 BP)
Try: Underwood 18' m Blackburn 28' m Lund 52' c Con: Sing 63'; Pen: Sing 40'	Report	Try: Crake 24' m Muir 31' m Boatman 43' c West 63' m Con: F. Williams 44'; Pen: F. Williams 48'

Hartpury University Stadium

17 April 2021
13:00

Sale Sharks Women	17–10	Exeter Chiefs Women (1 BP)
Try: Neumann 35' c Bawden 70' c Con: Daley-McLean (2) 35', 70'; Pen: Daley-McLean 10'	Report	Try: Kato 62' c Con: Cantorna 62'; Pen: Cantorna 14'

Heywood Road

==== Round 18 ====
8 May 2021
14:00

DMP Durham Sharks	0–67	Harlequins Women (1 BP)
	Report	Try: Brooks 4' m Breach (3) 8' m, 16' c, 33' c Beckett 27' c Tuima 37' c Wilcock 49' c Dobson 58' m Edwards 63' c Ward 66' m Con: Tuima (7) 12', 17', 28', 34', 38', 50', 63'

The Racecourse

8 May 2021
14:00

(1 BP) Loughborough Lightning	26–12	Sale Sharks Women
Try: Hunter 7' c Scarratt 14' m Davies 51' c Wassell 63' c Con: Scarratt (3) 7', 52', 63'	Report	Try: Delaney 34' m Neumann 70' c Con: Daley-McLean 70'

Loughborough University

8 May 2021
14:00

Worcester Warriors Women	0–27	Saracens Women (1 BP)
	Report	Try: Packer 19' m Lingham 49' m K. Evans 56' c Laqeretabua 65' m Con: Harrison (2) 49', 56'; Pen: Harrison 32'

Sixways

8 May 2021
14:00

(1 BP) Wasps Ladies	62–12	Bristol Bears Women
Try: Mason (3) 3' m, 24' c, 57' m MacDonald (2) 6' c, 20' c F. Williams 13' c Alder (2) 30' m, 48' m Kildunne (2) 51' m, 67' c Con: F. Williams (6) 7', 14', 21', 25', 49', 68'	Report	Try: Marston 17' c Jones 61' m Con: Skuse 18'

Twyford Avenue

8 May 2021
18:00

(1 BP) Exeter Chiefs Women	12–18	Gloucester-Hartpury
Try: Hunt 16' c Doidge 65' m Con: Cantorna 16'	Report	Try: Aldcroft 45' c Underwood 52' m Con: Sing 45'; Pen: Sing (2) 67', 69'

Sandy Park

=== Playoffs ===
Semi-finals
1	Saracens Women	28
4	Loughborough Lightning	24
2	Harlequins Women	25
3	Wasps Ladies	14

Final
1	Saracens Women	17
2	Harlequins Women	25

==== Semi-finals ====
22 May 2021
12:30

Harlequins Women (2)	25–14	(3) Wasps Ladies
Try: Cornborough 19' m Breach (2) 27' c, 51' c Con: Green (2/3) 28', 52'; Pen: Green (1/2) 12', 35' +1	Report	Try: Dow 48' c Stock 62' c Con: F. Williams (2/2) 49', 63'

Twickenham Stoop

22 May 2021
14:30

Saracens Women (1)	28–24	(4) Loughborough Lightning
Try: B. Cleall (3) 10' c, 23' c, 27' c P. Cleall 46' c Con: Harrison (4/4) 11', 24', 28', 47'	Report	Try: Davies (2) 5' c, 31' m Lloyd 19' c Field 67' m Con: Scarratt (2/4) 6', 20', 31'

StoneX Stadium

==== Final ====
30 May 2021
16:00

Saracens Women (1)	17–25	(2) Harlequins Women
Try: Packer (2) 26' c, 49' m de Goede 57' m Con: Harrison (1/3) 27'	Report	Try: Cokayne (2) 17' m, 22' m Pen: Tuima (4/4) 8', 12', 43', 61'

Kingsholm
Referee: Sara Cox

FB	15	(England) Sarah McKenna
RW	14	(England) Sydney Gregson		(substituted off) 51'
OC	13	(Ireland) Hannah Casey		(substituted off) 14'
IC	12	(England) Holly Aitchison
LW	11	(England) Lotte Clapp (c)
FH	10	(England) Zoe Harrison
SH	9	(England) Emma Swords		(substituted off) 43'
N8	8	(England) Poppy Cleall
OF	7	(England) Marlie Packer
BF	6	(England) Victoria Fleetwood		(substituted off) 61'
RL	5	(Canada) Emma Taylor		(substituted off) 43'
LL	4	(Canada) Sophie de Goede
TP	3	(England) Bryony Cleall	(yellow card) 42' to 52'			(substituted off) 52'
HK	2	(England) May Campbell		(substituted off) 52'
LP	1	(England) Hannah Botterman		(substituted off) 65'
Substitutions:
HK	16	(Scotland) Jodie Rettie		(substituted on) 52'
PR	17	(England) Rochelle Clark		(substituted on) 65'
PR	18	(Wales) Donna Rose			(substituted on) 48'
LK	19	(England) Rosie Galligan		(substituted on) 61'
FL	20	(Wales) Georgia Evans		(substituted on) 43'
SH	21	(England) Eloise Hayward		(substituted on) 43'
CE	22	(Canada) Alysha Corrigan		(substituted on) 51'
WG	23	(Fiji) Raijieli Laqeretabua		(substituted on) 14'	(substituted off) 48'	(substituted on) 52'
Coach:
(England) Alex Austerberry

FB	15	(Scotland) Chloe Rollie
RW	14	(England) Heather Cowell
OC	13	(England) Lagi Tuima
IC	12	(England) Rachael Burford (c)		(substituted off) 9'
LW	11	(England) Beth Wilcock		(substituted off) 62'	(substituted on) 67'
FH	10	(England) Emily Scott
SH	9	(England) Leanne Riley
N8	8	(England) Sarah Beckett
OF	7	(England) Katy Mew
BF	6	(England) Lauren Brooks		(substituted off) 51'
RL	5	(England) Fiona Fletcher
LL	4	(England) Abbie Ward	(yellow card) 56' to 67'
TP	3	(England) Shaunagh Brown
HK	2	(England) Amy Cokayne	(yellow card) 56' to 66'
LP	1	(England) Victoria Cornborough
Substitutions:
HK	16	(England) Rosie Dobson		(substituted on) 62'	(substituted off) 67'
PR	17	(Sweden) Tove Viksten
PR	18	(England) Chloe Edwards
LK	19	(England) Alex Eddie
FL	20	(England) Emily Robinson		(substituted on) 51'
SH	21	(England) Lucy Packer
FH	22	(England) Ellie Green
WG	23	(England) Izzy Mayhew		(substituted on) 9'
Coach:
(Ireland) Gerard Mullen

Player of the Match:
(England) Shaunagh Brown (Harlequins)
Touch judges:
Nikki O'Donnell
Katherine Ritchie
Television Match Official:
Craig Maxwell-Keys

== Leading scorers ==
=== Most points ===
As of 30 May 2021

Rank	Player	Club	Points
1	(England) Zoe Harrison	Saracens	105
2	(England) Megan Jones	Wasps	103
3	(England) Lark Davies	Loughborough	100
4	(England) Ellie Green	Harlequins	97
5	(United States) Gabby Cantorna	Exeter	93
6	(England) May Campbell	Saracens	85
7	(England) Emily Scarratt	Loughborough	84
8	(England) Poppy Cleall	Saracens	80
9	(England) Jess Breach	Harlequins	75
10	(England) Abigail Dow	Wasps	70

=== Most tries ===
As of 30 May 2021

Rank	Player	Club	Tries
1	(England) Lark Davies	Loughborough	20
2	(England) May Campbell	Saracens	17
3	(England) Poppy Cleall	Saracens	16
4	(England) Jess Breach	Harlequins	15
5	(England) Abigail Dow	Wasps	14
6	(Wales) Jasmine Joyce	Bristol	12
6	(England) Amy Cokayne	Harlequins	12
8	(Wales) Sioned Harries	Worcester	11
9	(England) Shaunagh Brown	Harlequins	9
9	(England) Abbie Ward	Harlequins	9
9	(England) Maud Muir	Wasps	9
9	(Scotland) Rhona Lloyd	Loughborough	9
