= Kelly Taylor (disambiguation) =

Kelly Taylor is a character from the Beverly Hills, 90210 franchise.

Kelly Taylor may also refer to:

- Kelly Taylor (EastEnders), a character from EastEnders
- Kelly Taylor (rugby union), English rugby union player
- Kelly Taylor, member of DCappella
- Kelly Taylor, a character in From Justin to Kelly
- Kelly Taylor, a character in Burning Bright
