= Jess Breach =

England international rugby union player

- Full name: Jessica Frances Breach
- Born: 4 November 1997 (age 29)
- Height: 1.68 m (5 ft 6 in)
- Weight: 73 kg (161 lb)

Rugby union career
- Position: Wing
- Current team: Saracens Women
Senior career
Years	Team	Apps	(Points)
2016–2017	Aylesford Bulls		
2017–2022	Harlequins		
2022–	Saracens		
International career
Years	Team	Apps	(Points)
2016–2017	England U20s		
2017–	England	53	(265)
National sevens teams
Years	Team		Comps
2015	England U18s		
2017–2018	England		
Medal record
Representing England
Women's rugby sevens
Commonwealth Games
Bronze medal – third place	2018 Gold Coast	Team competition
Women's rugby union
Rugby World Cup
Gold medal – first place	2025 England	Team competition
Silver medal – second place	2021 New Zealand	Team competition

Jessica Frances "Jess" Breach (born 4 November 1997) is an English professional rugby union footballer who plays for Saracens and England. Her preferred position is wing. She was the top try scorer for England when they won the 2025 World Cup.

== International career ==
Breach scored six tries on her international debut for England women's national rugby union team against Canada in November 2017. She also scored five more tries on her second international appearance the following week.

Breach played for Rugby Sevens for England and won a bronze medal as part of the England team at the 2018 Commonwealth Games. She also played at the World Cup Sevens in San Francisco. where she won a bronze medal.

In January 2019, Breach returned to XVs and was awarded a full time contract with the England side. She played for the team in the 2019 Women's Six Nations Championship and topped the try-scoring charts for the tournament. On 10 February 2019, Breach scored two tries as England ladies defeated France in the Six Nations Championship. She missed the 2019 Super Series due to a shoulder injury but returned for the Autumn. Following the 2020 Six Nations, she had scored 22 tries in her first 13 tests.

She was named in the England squad for the delayed 2021 Rugby World Cup held in New Zealand in October and November 2022.

On 17 March 2025, she was called into the England side for the 2025 Six Nations Championship. In July 2025, she was named in the England squad for the 2025 Rugby World Cup. Breach featured in the opening match against the Eagles, and then scored her fiftieth international try as part of a hat-trick in their 92–3 win against Samoa in their second game. She won her fiftieth test match cap, and secured her fiftieth win in an England shirt, in their World Cup match against Australia on 6 September 2025. She finished the tournament as England's top try scorer with six, as they became World Champions.

In May 2026, she scored two tries against France in the Six Nations Championship as England extended their unbeaten run to 38 matches and won a fifth consecutive grand slam in the event. That year, Breach was named by World Rugby in the Women’s 15s Dream Team of the Year.

== Club career ==
Breach joined Aylesford Bulls Ladies in 2016, where she won a league and cup double before the club merged into Harlequins Women. She won the 2020–21 Premier 15s with Harlequins but missed the final due to an ankle injury. She joined Saracens in 2022. She extended her contract with Saracens in October 2025.

== Early and personal life ==
Breach grew up in Chichester, West Sussex. She started playing rugby at age six at Chichester RFC, she then joined Pulborough RFC at age 14 and was national champion in her last year at the club. She won the European Sevens with England U18s in 2014 and 2015 and captained the talent development group side against Canada. She attended Downview, Lavant House, and Bishop Luffa schools.

At school, alongside rugby, Breach was also a keen athlete and competed in sprint hurdling at the English Schools Athletics Championships. She also played netball and hockey, and was a county-level gymnast.

She was invited to England camps at the age of 16 and secured a spot in the England U18 training squad.

In 2019, she enrolled at St Mary's University to study Sports Communication and Marketing. In 2026, she was awarded an Honorary Doctorate in Sport by the university in recognition of her outstanding contribution to English rugby.

She is in a relationship with Former Harlequins player Archie White.

== Honours ==
England

- Women's Rugby World Cup
  - (gold) Champion (1): 2025
