= Leanne Infante =

England international rugby union player

- Born: Leanne Nicole Riley; 18 July 1993 (age 33)
- Height: 1.72 m (5 ft 8 in)
- Weight: 65 kg (143 lb)

Rugby union career
- Position: Scrum-half
- Current team: Saracens Women
Senior career
| Years | Team | Apps | (Points) |
| 2013–2015, 2022–2025 | Saracens | 47 | (45) |
| 2015–2016 | Richmond | | |
| 2016–2017 | Aylesford Bulls | 17 | (20) |
| 2017–2021 | Harlequins | 56 | (120) |
| 2021–2022 | Bristol Bears | 9 | (5) |
International career
| Years | Team | Apps | (Points) |
| 2011–2013 | England U20s | | |
| 2013– | England | 57 | (42) |
National sevens team
| Years | Team | | Comps |
| 2012–2013 | England | | |
Medal record
Representing England
Women's rugby union
Rugby World Cup
| Silver medal – second place | 2021 New Zealand | Team competition |
| Silver medal – second place | 2017 Ireland | Team competition |

Leanne Nicole Infante (née Riley, born 18 July 1993) is an English former rugby union player. She made her debut for England in 2013 and was a finalist in the 2017 Women's Rugby World Cup. At club level, she ended her career playing for Saracens.

== International career ==
In 2012, Infante was part of the England 7s team that won the 2012 Hong Kong Women's Sevens. Her debut for the senior England 15s side came in 2013 against South Africa.

At the 2017 Women's Rugby World Cup, Infante was part of the England team who took the silver medal.

She scored her first international try at the 2018 Women's Six Nations Championship and was awarded a full time contract with the team in 2019.

She was part of the Grand Slam winning England team at the 2019 Six Nations and was also named to the Super Series squad the same year.

Infante continues to play for the England Women's Rugby Team as of the 2022 Six Nations. She was named in the England squad for the delayed 2021 Rugby World Cup held in New Zealand in October and November 2022.

== Club career ==
Infante joined Saracens Women in 2013 and moved on to Richmond FC in 2015.

In 2017, she won the Women's Premiership with the Aylesford Bulls Ladies - later that year, the club was taken over by Harlequins Ladies where Infante continues to play as a scrum half. She later won the Premier 15s in 2021 for Harlequins before moving to Bristol Bears Women. Infante rejoined Saracens Women for the 2022/3 season.

Riley holds a distinction of winning the Premiership with every side she has represented.

== Retirement ==
Infante announced her retirement from professional rugby union in October 2024. Her last game for Saracens was in the 100-0 defeat of Leicester Tigers, on 11 January 2025.

== Early life and education ==
She began playing rugby at Park Hill Primary School, Coventry, aged 10. She moved on to the Old Coventrians before playing for both the Worcester and Lichfield U18s.

Riley attended Allesley Primary School and Coundon Court Secondary school. She achieved a BTEC National Diploma in Sports Performance and Excellence, and has a sports massage qualification from Southam College.

As well as rugby, Riley is a skilled netball player and has previously played for Warwickshire.

Before she received her full-time England contract, Riley worked as a sports massage therapist and gym receptionist.

Riley is an ambassador for the Harlequins' Switch initiative and the Lions Sports Academy, which involves her encouraging young people to try rugby and offering coaching.
