= Shaunagh Brown =

England international rugby union player

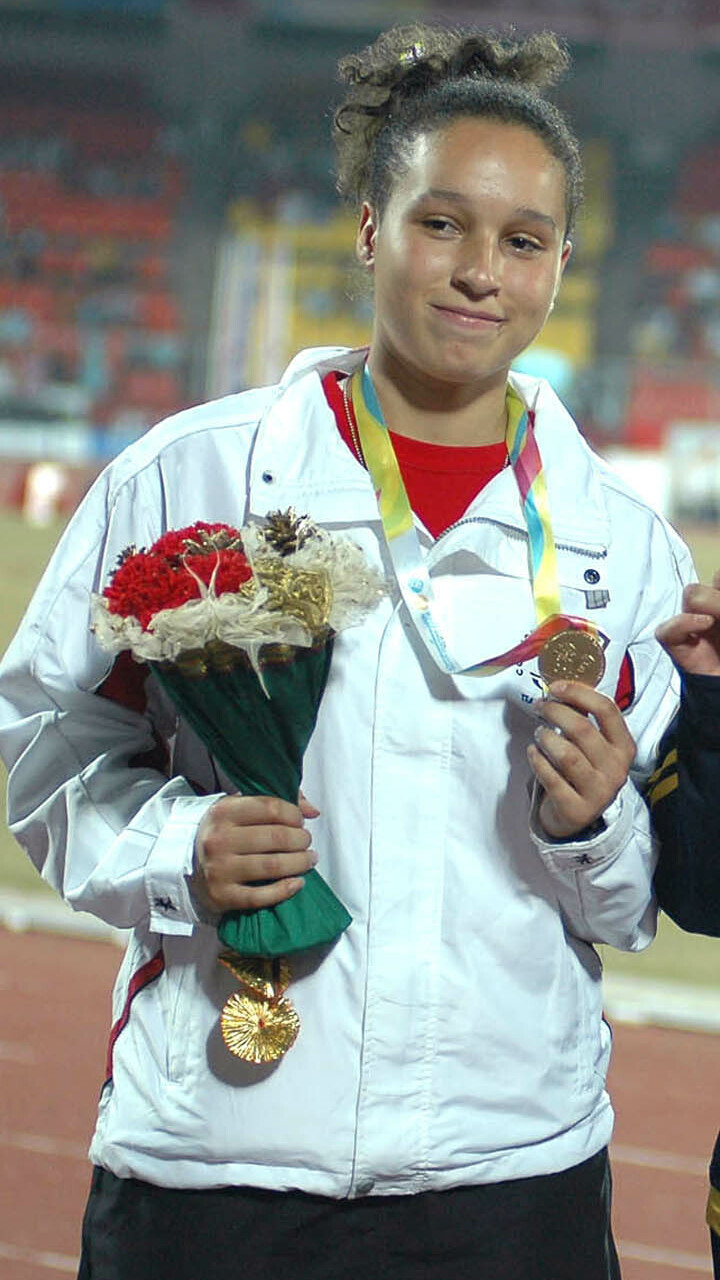
- Born: Shaunagh Brown; 15 March 1990 (age 36) London, England
- Height: 1.78 m (5 ft 10 in)
- Weight: 95 kg (209 lb)

Rugby union career
- Position: Flanker / Prop
- Current team: Harlequins Women
Senior career
Years	Team	Apps	(Points)
2016–2017	Aylesford Bulls		
2017−2023	Harlequins	44	(250)
International career
Years	Team	Apps	(Points)
2017–2022	England	30	(15)
Medal record
Representing England
Women's rugby union
Rugby World Cup
Silver medal – second place	2021 New Zealand	Team competition

Shaunagh Jordan Brown (born 15 March 1990) is a former English rugby union player and former hammer thrower. In rugby union she represented England and Harlequins Women until her retirement in December 2022. She made her debut for the England national team in 2017 against Canada. Brown represented England in the hammer throw event at the 2014 Commonwealth Games in Glasgow, and has also worked as a gas engineer, firefighter, and commercial diver.

== International career ==
Before rugby, Brown had a career in athletics: she represented England in the hammer throw at the 2014 Commonwealth Games. She also boxed professionally, competed in discus and shotput, and participated in Strongwoman competitions.

Brown began playing rugby aged 25 and made her international debut two years later in November 2017 when England played Canada. She received permission from the Kent Fire and Rescue Service, with whom she was training for a new career, to play her first international game.

In 2019, she received a full time contract from the Rugby Football Union (RFU) and played in every game of the 2019 Women's Six Nations which England won with a Grand Slam.

Brown was unable to play in the 2019 Super Series due to injury but returned to international rugby for the start of the 2019/20 season. She was part of the 2020 Women's Six Nations Grand Slam winning England team.

Brown was named in the England squad for the delayed 2021 Rugby World Cup held in New Zealand in October and November 2022. She made her final international appearance in the 2021 Rugby World Cup Final and retired from rugby in December 2022.

== Club career ==
Brown began her career at Medway RFC in 2015. She moved to Harlequins Women in 2016 where she played in every league game as they won the title.

She was a key part of the working group set up by the RFU's 'Rugby Against Racism' campaign alongside former England player Ugo Monye. In 2020, she was nominated for Influencer of the Year at the Sunday Times Sportswomen of the Year Awards for her Instagram campaign to highlight black stories and history during 2020 Black History Month.

== Early life and education ==
Brown was raised in Kennington, south London. Her father is Jamaican and her mother is English. She was a member of the Blackheath and Bromley Harriers athletics club.

She attended Walnut Tree Walk Primary School and Addey and Stanhope School.

In 2010, she trained as a British Gas engineer and worked for the company until she became a commercial diver in 2015. In 2017, she began training with Kent Fire and Rescue Service and was a full time firefighter until 2020, taking a three-year sabbatical after she was awarded a full time professional rugby contract.

In 2019, Brown was named one of the Evening Standard’s most influential Londoners.
