= Maud Muir =

England international rugby union player

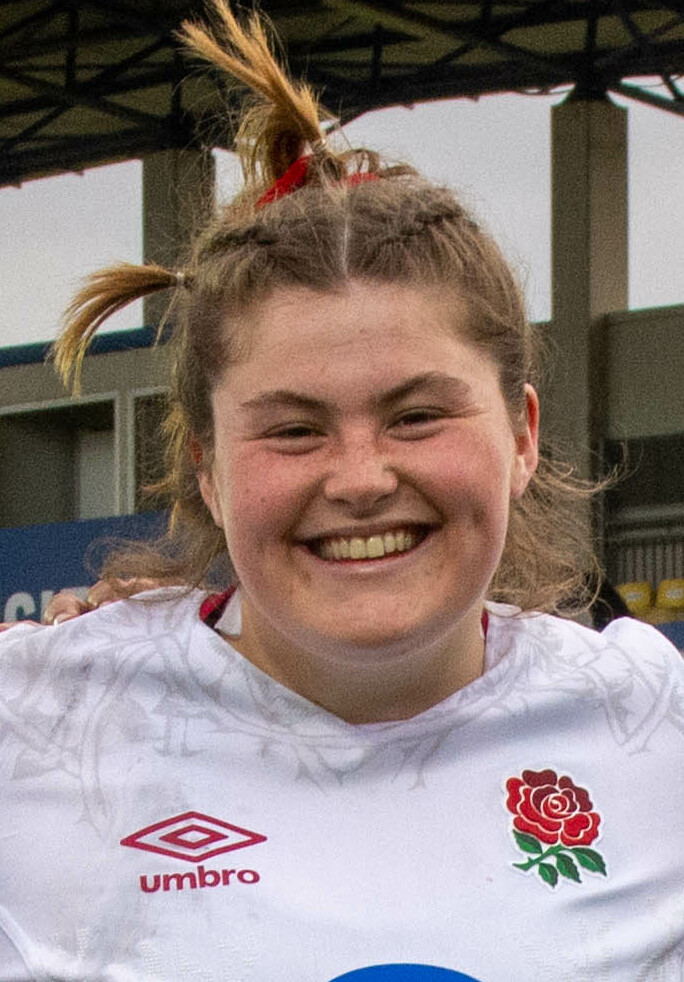
- Muir in 2022
- Born: 12 July 2001 (age 25) Oxford, England
- Height: 164 cm (5 ft 5 in)
- Weight: 100 kg (220 lb; 15 st 10 lb)

Rugby union career
- Position: Prop
Senior career
Years	Team	Apps	(Points)
2018–2022	Wasps Women		(0)
2022–present	Gloucester-Hartpury	33	(0)
International career
Years	Team	Apps	(Points)
2021–present	England	48	(35)
Medal record
Representing England
Women's rugby union
Rugby World Cup
Gold medal – first place	2025 England	Team competition
Silver medal – second place	2021 New Zealand	Team competition

Maud Moyra Hazel Muir (born 12 July 2001) is an English rugby union player. She has played for England in the Six Nations, the 2021 Rugby World Cup and was in the winning England team for the 2025 Women's Rugby World Cup. She plays for Gloucester-Hartpury at club level.

== International career ==
Muir has been a member of the England U20s and U18s sides. In 2021, she was named as part of the England squad for the 2021 Women's Six Nations Championships as one of six development players on the side. She was a non-playing reserve in the opening two Six Nations games against Scotland and Italy. She was named in the England squad for the delayed 2021 Rugby World Cup held in New Zealand in October and November 2022.

Muir was named in England's squad for the 2025 Women's Six Nations Championship. She was named in the Red Roses side for the Women's Rugby World Cup in England, and was in the starting line-up for the final, playing as prop. Muir won her fiftieth cap during the 2026 Six Nations Championship against Scotland on 18 April, in an 84-7 victory.

== Club career ==
Muir joined her first senior club side, Wasps Women, in 2018.

In 2022, Muir left Wasps to join Gloucester-Hartpury. She was part of the team that won the 2022–23 Premier 15s title. She signed a new contract with Gloucester-Hartpury in February 2025.

== Early life and education ==
Muir grew up in Oxford, and attended Cherwell School. She began playing rugby in Oxford at a young age, and joined the Oxford Harlequins (U6-U11) and then moved to the Gosford All Blacks, joining the U15 and later U18 sides.

She represented the South West at age grade level and moved to the Wasps' Centre of Excellence before joining the senior team.

She was awarded a Brunel Sports Scholarship, allowing her to train as a professional athlete while studying a sports science degree.

Muir played cricket until she was 12, partly because her mother preferred watching cricket to rugby. She was an excellent fielder but only an average batter. In 2025, she hosted a workshop with teammates Ellie Kildunne and Lucy Packer which aimed to "inspire the next generation of female players at Chinnor Rugby Club in Thame, Oxfordshire."

== Honours ==
England

- Women's Rugby World Cup
  - (gold) Champion (1): 2025
