= Mackenzie Carson =

Canada & England international rugby union player

- Born: 24 June 1998 (age 28) Langley, British Columbia, Canada
- Height: 170 cm (5 ft 7 in)
- Weight: 90 kg (198 lb)
- School: Yale Secondary School
- University: University of British Columbia

Rugby union career
- Position: Prop
- Current team: Gloucester-Hartpury
Amateur team(s)
Years	Team	Apps	(Points)
–	Abbotsford RFC	–	(–)
Senior career
Years	Team	Apps	(Points)
2018–2019	Bristol Bears Women	–	(–)
2019–2023	Saracens Women	–	(–)
2023–	Gloucester-Hartpury		
International career
Years	Team	Apps	(Points)
2016	Canada U18s	–	(–)
2016–17	Canada U20s	–	(–)
2018–19	Canada	3	(–)
2023–	England	30	(15)
Medal record
Representing England
Women's rugby union
Rugby World Cup
Gold medal – first place	2025 England	Team competition

Mackenzie Carson (born 24 June 1998) is a Canadian-born rugby union player, who currently plays for Gloucester-Hartpury in Premiership Women's Rugby, the top-flight women's rugby union competition in England, and for the England national team at international level, having previously represented Canada three times.

== Early life and education ==
Carson was born in Langley, British Columbia to an English mother and a Canadian father, and grew up in Abbotsford. She was first introduced to rugby at Abbotsford RFC in 2008, at the age of nine, and progressed all the way from the minis program up to the senior side.

While a high school student at Yale Secondary School, Carson represented her home province British Columbia, winning the inaugural U16s Canadian National Championship in 2013. She later captained the U18s team to victory at the National 7s Championship and the Las Vegas International 7s Championship in 2016. In addition, she earned a bronze medal as a member of the BC senior team, competing at the 2017 National Championship. Carson also played in the BC Summer Games in 2014 winning a gold medal.

Carson attended the University of British Columbia at Vancouver in 2016, on the George Jones Scholarship, and played (Captained) for the UBC Thunderbirds throughout her studies, while at UBC she was awarded the Can-West Rookie of the Year as well as the U Sport Rookie of the Year.

Carson has played many positions over her career including fly-half, centre, hook, back row finally settling in at loosehead for England and professionally.

== Club career ==
Carson began her senior club career when she moved from her native Canada to England, in order to play for Bristol Bears in the Premier 15s. After spending the 2018–19 season at Bristol, she transferred to Saracens. Although her appearances were limited by an ankle injury which required surgery, as well as the disruption of the COVID-19 pandemic, she returned to the club in early 2021, alongside fellow Canadian internationals Alysha Corrigan, Sophie de Goede and Emma Taylor.

Following the end of the 2020–21 season, Carson signed a new deal with Saracens. She then enjoyed a breakthrough year during the 2021–22 season, becoming an established starter in various positions across the forward pack. This culminated in winning her first Premier 15s title, as she started the final for Saracens at blindside flanker and scored a try, en route to a 43–21 triumph against arch-rivals Exeter Chiefs.

Saracens announced that Carson had left the club on 1 July 2023. On 4 August 2023, it was announced that Carson had signed for reigning Premier 15s champions Gloucester-Hartpury.

== International career ==
Carson was identified by Rugby Canada and brought into the international player pathway at the age of 17. She represented the Canada U18s team in England in 2016. That same year, she graduated up to the Canada U20s, returning to England for a three-match series, as she made a permanent transition to playing as a forward.

In autumn 2018, Carson made her full international test debut for Canada, as a replacement hooker in a defeat to England. This was the first of three caps she earned with Canada's senior team.

Ahead of the 2023 Women's Six Nations Championship, Carson received her first call-up to England, after switching her national allegiance, under international rugby union eligibility rules. She successfully applied for the transfer, having qualified to play for England by birthright through her English mother, and completed a three-year stand-down from her last cap for Canada. Carson was named in the starting line-up for her England debut, in the opening round fixture against Scotland, as a loosehead prop. This made her the first rugby player to represent England, either for the women's or men's senior sides, after being capped by another nation.

On 17 March 2025, she was selected in England's squad for the Women's Six Nations Championship. She was later named in England's squad for the Women's Rugby World Cup in England.

== Personal life ==
Carson graduated from the University of British Columbia with a bachelor's degree in history.

While still living in Canada, Carson coached the U16 and U18 teams in the Fraser Valley. Upon moving to England, she achieved a level 2 coaching certificate with the RFU.

Aside from her playing career with Saracens, Carson was employed as a project officer at the club's charitable arm, the Saracens Foundation, and also a project assistant at the Hertfordshire Sports Partnership. In recognition of her efforts, she was nominated for the Community Coach of the Year Award by Premiership Rugby in 2022.

== Honours ==
England

- Women's Rugby World Cup
  - (gold) Champion (1): 2025
