= Tatyana Heard =

England international rugby union player

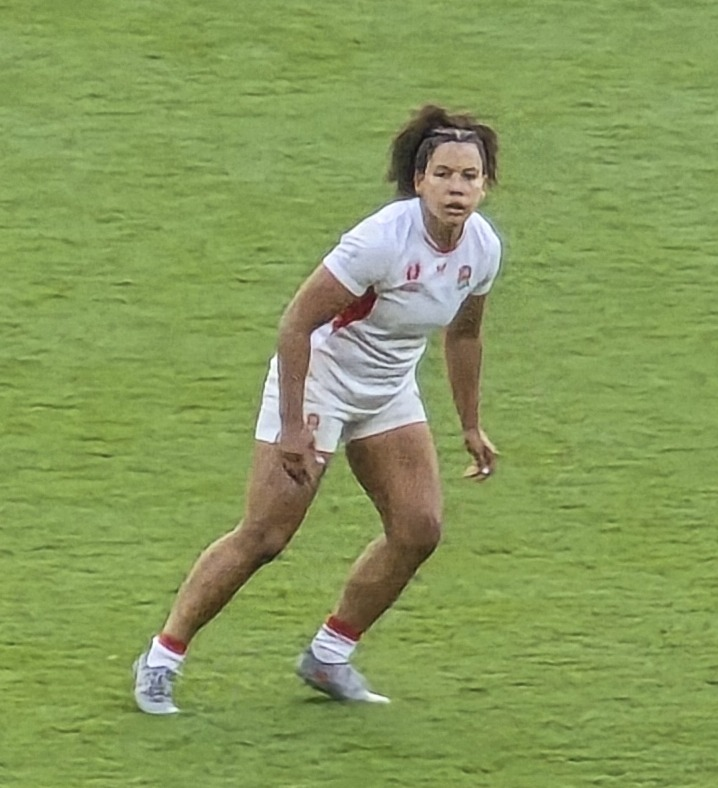
- 2025 Women's Rugby World Cup final
- Full name: Tatyana Aleese Heard
- Born: 14 January 1995 (age 31) Pisa, Tuscany, Italy
- Height: 164 cm (5 ft 5 in)
- Weight: 75 kg (165 lb; 11 st 11 lb)
- School: Ryedale School
- University: Cardiff Metropolitan University

Rugby union career
- Position: Centre
- Current team: Sale Sharks
Youth career
- 2006–2009: Malton and Norton RUFC
Senior career
Years	Team	Apps	(Points)
2013–2016	Cardiff Met RFC		(0)
2017–2026	Gloucester-Hartpury		(0)
2026-	Sale Sharks		
International career
Years	Team	Apps	(Points)
2018–	England	36	(20)
Medal record
Women's rugby union
Representing England
Rugby World Cup
Gold medal – first place	2025 England	Team competition
Silver medal – second place	2021 New Zealand	Team competition

Tatyana Aleese Heard (born 14 January 1995) is an Italian-born English rugby union player. She is a member of the England women's national rugby union team and plays for Sale Sharks in the PWR.

== International career ==
Heard had initially been selected for the England U20 squad in 2012-13 but shortly afterwards an ACL injury left her sidelined for well over a year. She eventually made her senior England debut in November 2018 against the USA.

In September 2022 Heard was named in the England squad for the COVID-delayed 2021 Rugby World Cup.

On 17 March 2025, she was called up into England's squad for the Women's Six Nations Championship. She was named in the Red Roses side for the Women's Rugby World Cup.

== Club career ==
After university Heard moved to Gloucester and from 2017 has played for Gloucester-Hartpury in a variety of positions.

== Early life and education ==
Heard was born in Italy and spent some of her early years in the US, but she grew up in Ryedale where she played for Malton and Norton RUFC and for Yorkshire at age grade level. She studied for A-levels at Hartpury College and then for a degree in sports conditioning, rehabilitation and massage at Cardiff Metropolitan University, where she was part of the Cardiff Met team that won the 2016 BUCS rugby final.

== Honours ==
England

- Women's Rugby World Cup
  - (gold) Champion (1): 2025
