= Kelly Taylor (rugby union) =

England international rugby union player

- Born: Kelly Smith; 21 December 1995 (age 30)

Rugby union career
- Position: Wing
Amateur team(s)
Years	Team	Apps	(Points)
2017-	Gloucester-Hartpury		
International career
Years	Team	Apps	(Points)
2018-	England	14	(45)
National sevens team
Years	Team		Comps
2017-	England		

Kelly Taylor (née Smith, born 21 December 1995) is an English rugby union player.

Smith began playing rugby at age 10. She made her senior debut with Worcester Valkyries before joining Gloucester-Hartpury in 2017.

Her debut with the England national team was at the 2018 Six Nations Championship where she played in England's last game. She also played at the 2019 Six Nations Championship which England won the Grand Slam. She scored two tries over four games. She was selected to play in the 2020 Women's Six Nations Championship, which was postponed midway due to the COVID-19 pandemic.

In 2019, she was one of 28 players awarded a full-time contract with the English national team.
