= Beth Blacklock =

Scotland international rugby union player

- Born: 13 November 1997 (age 29) Colchester, Essex
- Height: 1.75 m (5 ft 9 in)
- Weight: 83 kg (183 lb)

Rugby union career
- Position: Centre
Senior career
Years	Team	Apps	(Points)
2016–20	Durham University		(0)
2017–20	DMP Sharks		(0)
2020–23	Harlequins		(0)
2023–	Saracens		(0)
Provincial / State sides
Years	Team	Apps	(Points)
2024	Glasgow Warriors	1	(5)
International career
Years	Team	Apps	(Points)
2023–	Scotland	6	(0)

Elizabeth Blacklock (born 13 November 1997) is a rugby union player who represents Saracens and Scotland. She plays as a centre.

== Rugby career ==
Blacklock, who was born in Colchester, qualifies to play for Scotland through her mother. She made her Scotland debut as a substitute against England during the 2023 Women's Six Nations Championship.

Blacklock completed undergraduate and postgraduate degrees at Durham University, whilst also being a key player for Darlington Mowden Park Sharks.

She was named in Scotland's squad for the 2025 Six Nations Championship in March. She was also selected in the Scottish side for the Women's Rugby World Cup.
