= Archie White (rugby union) =

English rugby union player

- Born: Archie White; 5 August 1997 (age 29) Chertsey, England
- Height: 1.88 m (6 ft 2 in)
- Weight: 104 kg (16 st 5 lb; 229 lb)

Rugby union career
- Position: Flanker
- Current team: Harlequins
Senior career
Years	Team	Apps	(Points)
2015–2025	Harlequins		
- Correct as of 30 May 2025

Archie White (born 5 August 1997) is a former English professional rugby union player who played as a flanker for Premiership Rugby club Harlequins.

He is in a relationship with England and Saracens player Jess Breach.
