= Kelsey Jones (rugby union) =

Wales international rugby union footballer

- Born: 4 September 1997 (age 29) Neath Port Talbot, South Wales
- Height: 1.65 m (5 ft 5 in)
- Weight: 81 kg (179 lb)
- School: Llangatwg Comprehensive School
- Occupation(s): Participation officer, rugby player

Rugby union career
- Position: Hooker
- Current team: Gloucester-Hartpury
Senior career
Years	Team	Apps	(Points)
2019-present	Gloucester-Hartpury		(0)
–	Ospreys		
–	Seven Sisters		
International career
Years	Team	Apps	(Points)
2017–present	Wales	52	(20)
- Correct as of 24 September 2025

Kelsey Jade Jones (born 4 September 1997) is a Welsh Rugby Union professional player who plays hooker for the Wales women's national rugby union team and Gloucester-Hartpury in the Premier 15s.

== Rugby career ==
=== Club career ===
Jones began rugby training in 2014, at the age of 16, with Seven Sisters in the Neath Valleys. With no official youth set-up at the club she wasn't able to play her first match until she turned 17. She then helped to create an official youth side, and became the club's first ever girls' youth team captain.

Jones then played for Ospreys U18s and then Ospreys Seniors, before joining Gloucester-Hartpury at the Premier 15s League in 2019.

=== International career ===
Jones made her international debut as a substitute against New Zealand in the 2017 Women's Rugby World Cup in Ireland.

In January 2019, she was named in the Wales squad for the 2019 Six Nations Championship, before being called up for the 2020 tournament, and later the 2021 Championship.

She was selected in Wales squad for the 2021 Rugby World Cup in New Zealand.

Jones was named in the Welsh side for the 2025 Six Nations in March. She was later named in the squad to the Women's Rugby World Cup that will be held in England.

== Personal life ==
Jones was born in Neath Port Talbot to parents Jason and Becky Jones. She is the youngest of three daughters.

As a child, Jones attended Llangatwg Comprehensive School, followed by the Llandarcy Academy of Sport.

Jones is passionate about diversity and inclusion in women's rugby. Following a year-long development apprenticeship with WRU, she moved into a hands-on role that saw her coaching women's, girl's, disability and wheelchair games. She then took the role of disability and inclusion officer at the Cardiff Blues Community Foundation, which covers 76 community clubs, 61 secondary schools and 320 primary schools in South Wales.

Jones now works for Gloucester Rugby as lead participation officer, working with secondary schools to encourage wider participation in rugby among minority and disadvantaged communities. Alongside this role, she also spends time in schools and colleges promoting wheelchair rugby.
