= Jess Wooden =

American rugby union player

- Born: Jessica Wooden; August 21, 1988 (age 38)
- Education: Wharton High School
- Alma mater: University of Florida
- Height: 5 ft 7 in (170 cm)
- Weight: 150 lb (68 kg)

Rugby union career
- Position: Full back
Senior career
Years	Team	Apps	(Points)
- Aylesford Bulls Ladies
–	Harlequins Ladies		
International career
Years	Team	Apps	(Points)
2016	United States	13	

Jessica Wooden (born August 21, 1988) is an American rugby union player. She debuted for the United States in 2016. She was selected for the squad to the 2017 Women's Rugby World Cup in Ireland.

== Rugby career ==
Wooden began playing rugby in her senior year at the University of Florida. She plays for the Harlequins Ladies in the Premier 15s. Her previous club was Aylesford Bulls Ladies before they merged with Harlequins Ladies.

She trained at the American Rugby Pro Training Center in a bid for a spot on the Eagles 2016 Olympic team.
