= Gloucester–Hartpury =

English rugby union club, based in Gloucestershire

Gloucester-Hartpury
- Full name: Gloucester-Hartpury Women's Rugby Football Club
- Union: Gloucestershire RFU
- Nickname(s): The Circus; Cherry and Whites
- Founded: 2014; 12 years ago
- Ground(s): Hartpury Stadium; Kingsholm Stadium
- CEO: Rebecca Dennis
- Coach: Vacant
- Captain: Alex Matthews
- League: Premiership Women's Rugby
- 2025–26: 1st of 9 (lost play-off semi-final)
Home kit	Away kit

Largest win
- Birmingham Moseley Ladies 0–95 Gloucester-Hartpury (Billesley Common, Moseley); 11 September 2016

Largest defeat
- Gloucester-Hartpury 0–62 Saracens Women (The ALPAS Arena, Hartpury); 7 April 2018; Harlequins Women 62–0 Gloucester-Hartpury (Twickenham Stoop, Twickenham); 30 March 2019

Official website
- www.gloucesterrugby.co.uk/gloucester-hartpury-women-home

Gloucester–Hartpury Women's Rugby Football Club are an English women's rugby union club based in Gloucester and Hartpury, Gloucestershire. They are the unified women's team of Gloucester Rugby and Hartpury University R.F.C. They were founded in 2014 and since 2017 they have played in Premiership Women's Rugby.

== History ==
=== 2014–2017: Formation & early years ===
In 2014, Gloucester Rugby and Hartpury College came together to found a women's team to be run under the jurisdiction of Gloucester Rugby to capitalise upon the popularity of women's rugby in the area. Hartpury College already had a women's team competing in the BUCS rugby union leagues.

In their first year, Gloucester–Hartpury only played friendly matches, some of which were at Gloucester Rugby's home ground Kingsholm Stadium, whilst the Rugby Football Union decided which league to place them in. The team started with numbers as low as 4 and grew into a much bigger squad. The first captain was Stacy Payne (Hardie) and the vice-captain was Jessica Morgan. The team won the Junior Cup in their first season.

In 2015, the RFU placed them in Women's Championship Midlands 2. In their first season they finished second in the league. The following season, they were unbeaten.

=== 2017–2023: Premier 15's ===
In 2017, to take advantage of an increase in women's rugby participation following England's victory in the 2014 Women's Rugby World Cup, it was announced that Gloucester–Hartpury were awarded a franchise in the new women's top flight, the Premier 15s, as part of a reorganisation of women's rugby in England, despite never competing in the Women's Premiership or Women's Championship and moving up two leagues as a result. This was controversial as, despite the franchises being awarded by an independent body, Gloucester–Hartpury were awarded the position in top flight at the expense of Lichfield Ladies who had been competing in the top flight of English women's rugby for 15 years. There was speculation that this was due to geographical considerations.

=== 2022–2025: Increased funding and league success ===
Ahead of the 2022-23 Premier 15s season, Gloucester Rugby announced a significant increase in funding to Gloucester–Hartpury by almost 500%, matching an enhanced contribution from Hartpury University. It was also announced that both the men's and the women's team would wear the same design kit. Former Gloucester player and Gloucester–Hartpury coach James Forrester was appointed CEO of the team in 2023.

In 2023, the team won the Premier 15s by beating Exeter Chiefs Women. By doing so, Gloucester–Hartpury became the first team based outside of London to win the league title. The final was held at Kingsholm Stadium, renamed 'Queensholm' for the occasion. The final drew a crowd of over 9,600 spectators, setting a new record and tripling the finals attendance of the previous season.

Premier 15s rebranded as Premiership Women's Rugby for the 2023–24 season onwards. Gloucester–Hartpury improved their form from the previous season winning 15 out of the 16 regular season games. Gloucester–Hartpury went on to win the final against Bristol Bears 36–24 becoming the second team after Saracens to win two titles in a row.

In January 2025, it was announced that long-time head coach Sean Lynn would take on a new role as head coach of the Wales Women. Lynn will initially continue as head coach of Gloucester–Hartpury alongside his duties with Wales, he will step down from his role at Gloucester–Hartpury at the end of the Premiership season in March 2025 to focus entirely on his position with the Welsh team. In February 2025, it was announced that CEO James Forrester would step down at the end of the 2024–25 season to move to a new role at Gloucester Rugby, it was also revealed that all commercial rights for Gloucester–Hartpury would sit under Gloucester Rugby from February 2025.

In March 2025, Gloucester–Hartpury won the PWR for a third consecutive time after beating Saracens 34–19. They became the second team to win the title three times, and the first to team to claim a three-peat. The 2025 final was Sean Lynn's last game as head coach, and Forrester's final game as CEO.

=== 2025–present: Post Lynn era ===
In April 2025, it was announced that Dan Murphy was appointed as Head Coach. Under Lynn's leadership, Murphy had served as scrum coach for Gloucester–Hartpury. On 23 June 2025, Murphy appointed former England international Matt Banahan as assistant coach, with Banahan joining from his previous role as Scotland Women's attack coach.

Gloucester–Hartpury entered the 2025–26 season as three-time defending champions. Eight Gloucester–Hartpury players were part of England's 2025 Women's Rugby World Cup-winning squad. co-captain Zoe Stratford publicly confirmed the club's goal was to go unbeaten for the entire season in pursuit of a fourth consecutive title.

During the season, a number of departures were confirmed ahead of 2026–27. Including co-captain and England captain Stratford. Also confirmed as deparating is assistant coach Banahan to take up a backs and attack coaching role at Hartpury University R.F.C. in the men's Champ Rugby.

The club's target for a fourth consecutive title came to an abrupt end in the semi-final on 14 June 2026. Gloucester–Hartpury were defeated 26–29 by Trailfinders Women. On 16 June 2026, the club announced the signing of French international centre and former Women's Six Nations Player of the Championship, Gabrielle Vernier, for the 2026–27 campaign.

On 19 November 2026, 2 days before the first game of the season, head coach Dan Murphy departed his role. No replacement was named in the announcement but the club stated that "The existing coaching team will continue to run the senior programme". However it was announced that former England international Luke Narraway would join as a consultant coach to support the coaches while the club "considers its longer-term performance leadership structure".

== Current squad ==
The Gloucester–Hartpury squad for the current season (2026–27) is:

Gloucester–Hartpury 2026–27 Premiership Women's Rugby squad
**Hookers**: (England) Darcey Howchin; (Ireland) **Neve Jones**; (England) Lucy Simpson; (Italy) **Vittoria Vecchini**; **Props**: (England) Erin Bradley; (England) **Mackenzie Carson**; (England) Eloise Harris; (Ireland) Roisin Maher; (England) **Maud Muir** **(vc)**; (Ireland) **Niamh O'Dowd**; (Australia) **Bridie O'Gorman**; (England) Ranni Samuda; **Locks**: (Wales) **Jorja Aiono**; (United States) **Emerson Allen**; (England) Steph Else; (Ireland) **Sam Monaghan**; (Wales) **Alaw Pyrs**	**Back row**: (England) **Georgia Brock**; (England) Tabitha Copson; (England) Maisie Masquelier; (England) **Alex Matthews** **(c)**; (England) Sophie McQueen; (Wales) **Kate Williams**; (England) Ellie Wilson; **Scrum-halves**: (Wales) **Megan Davies**; (England) **Natasha Hunt** **(vc)**; (Wales) **Sian Jones**; **Fly-halves**: (Wales) **Lleucu George**; (England) Ellie Green	**Centres**: (England) Lauren Bailey; (England) Molly Bunker; (Wales) **Hannah Dallavalle**; (England) **Jade Shekells**; (France) **Gabrielle Vernier**; **Wings**: (England) Evelyn Clarke; (Wales) **Nel Metcalfe**; (England) Abi Pritchard; (England) Ellie Rugman; (Scotland) Hannah Smyth; **Fullbacks**: (England) **Emma Sing**; **Utility backs**: (England) **Mia Venner**
**(c)** denotes the team captain. (vc) denotes vice-captain. **Bold** denotes internationally capped players. Source:

== Club Staff ==
The publicly listed Gloucester–Hartpury staff for the upcoming season (2026–27) is:

Coaching Team

- Vacant — Head Coach
- Luke Narraway - Consultant coach
- Richie Williams — Assistant coach
- Lewis Arnold — Forwards coach & Under 23 Head Coach
- Lewis Ludlow — Assistant forwards coach

=== List of head coaches ===
As of 21 November 2026

Name	From	To	P	W	D	L	Win %	Honours	Ref
(England) Susie Appleby	2014 (Note: Results from the 2014–15 season are not included as no complete record was kept.)	January 2020 (Note: Although Appleby left her role in January 2020, no results from the 2019–20 season are included as the season was annulled due to the COVID-19 pandemic. Similarly, while Lynn joined part-way through the 2019–20 season, results start from the 2020–21 season.)	67	45	2	21	66.18	2014–15 RFU Women's Junior Cup (Note: Results from this competition are not included as no complete record was kept.); 2016–17 Women's Championship Midlands 2	
(Wales) Sean Lynn	January 2020	March 2025	107	77	1	29	71.96	2022–23, 2023–24 & 2024–25 PWR	
(England) Dan Murphy	April 2025	19 November 2026	20	15	0	8	65.22		
Vacant (Note: Murphy departed the club on 19 November 2026, no replacement head coach was named.)	19 November 2026		1	0	0	1	00.00		

== Season summaries ==
Season Summaries
	League				Cup	
Season	Competition	Final position	Points	Play-offs	Competition	Performance
2014–15	No competition				RFU Women's Junior Cup	Champions
2015–16	Women's Championship Midlands 2	2nd	56	-	RFU Women's Intermediate Cup	Quarter-final
2016–17	Women's Championship Midlands 2	1st	58	-	RFU Women's Intermediate Cup	Runners-up
2017–18	Premier 15s	4th	60	Semi-final	No competition	
2018–19	Premier 15s	5th	50	-	No competition	
2019–20	Premier 15s	Season Annulled			No competition	
2020–21	Premier 15s	5th	50	-	No competition	
2021–22	Premier 15s	6th	51	-	Allianz Cup	5th
2022–23	Premier 15s	1st	79	Champions	Allianz Cup	4th
2023–24	Premiership Women's Rugby	1st	76	Champions	Allianz Cup	3rd
2024–25	Premiership Women's Rugby	1st	68	Champions	No competition	
2025–26	Premiership Women's Rugby	1st	73	Semi-final	PWR Cup	4th in pool
2026–27	Premiership Women's Rugby				PWR Next Gen Cup	3rd in pool

Gold background denotes champions
Silver background denotes runners-up

== Season records ==
Season Records 2015/16–2026/27
Season	P	W	D	L	Ref	Season	P	W	D	L	Ref
2015–16	14	11	0	3		2024–25	18	15	0	3	
2016–17	16	15	0	1		2025–26	20	14	0	6	
2017–18	19	11	1	8		2026–27	4	1	0	3	
2018–19	18	8	1	9							
2019–20	Season annulled due to the COVID-19 pandemic										
2020–21	18	10	0	8							
2021–22	22	11	1	10							
2022–23	25	20	0	5							
2023–24	24	21	0	3							
Notes
Bold italics indicate season still in progress; Updated to matches played on or before 21 November 2026; 2024–25 season results do not include PWR UP results as it was considered a friendly competition.

== Results per opposition ==
The following table details the past performance of Gloucester–Hartpury against different opponents in Premiership Women's Rugby, between the start of the 2017-18 season and the end of the 2025–26 season.

Gloucester–Hartpury results per opposition (Premiership Women's Rugby 2017/18 - 2025/26 seasons)
Opposition	Span	Played	Won	Drawn	Lost	Win%	Points for	Average PF	Points against	Average PA	Points difference
Bristol	2017–2026	19	14	0	5	73.68%	542	28.53	309	16.26	233
DMP Sharks	2017–2024	10	9	0	1	90.00%	561	56.1	69	6.9	492
Exeter Chiefs	2020–2026	14	11	0	3	78.57%	425	30.36	318	22.71	107
Harlequins	2017–2026	16	9	0	7	56.25%	471	29.44	429	26.81	42
Leicester Tigers	2023–2026	6	6	0	0	100%	306	51	102	17	204
Loughborough Lightning	2017–2026	16	9	1	6	56.25%	560	35	412	25.75	148
Richmond	2017–2019	4	3	1	0	75.00%	126	31.5	56	14	70
Sale Sharks	2020–2026	12	12	0	0	100%	396	33	157	13.08	239
Saracens	2017–2026	19	6	1	12	31.58%	486	25.58	610	32.11	-124
Trailfinders	2023–2026	7	5	0	2	71.43%	251	35.86	187	26.71	64
Wasps	2017–2023	9	3	0	6	33.33%	238	26.44	230	25.55	8
Waterloo	2017–2019	4	4	0	0	100.00%	168	42	62	15.5	106
Worcester	2017–2023	10	10	0	0	100.00%	413	41.3	80	8	333
Overall	—	146	101	3	42	69.18%	4943	33.86	3021	20.69	1922

- Data includes all regular season and play-off matches (semi-finals and finals).
- The 2019–20 season is excluded due to it being abandoned because of the COVID-19 pandemic.
- All fixtures added from 2017–18 to 2025–26.

== Club honours ==
- Premiership Women's Rugby
  - Champions: (3) 2022–23, 2023–24, 2024–25
- Women's Championship Midlands 2
  - Champions: (1) 2016–17
  - Runners-up: (1) 2015–16
- RFU Women's Intermediate Cup
  - Runners-up: (1) 2016–17
- RFU Women's Junior Cup
  - Champions: (1) 2014–15

== Notable players ==
- Zoe Aldcroft – 2021 World Rugby Women's 15s Player of the Year; played in the 2021 Rugby World Cup final, became England captain in January 2025, and led the team to victory in the 2025 Women's Rugby World Cup final while representing Gloucester–Hartpury.
- (England) Alex Matthews – played in the 2021 Rugby World Cup final, and won the 2025 Women's Rugby World Cup final while at Gloucester–Hartpury.
- (England) Maud Muir – played in the 2021 Rugby World Cup final, and won the 2025 Women's Rugby World Cup final while at Gloucester–Hartpury.
- (England) Tatyana Heard – played in the 2021 Rugby World Cup final while at Gloucester–Hartpury, and won the 2025 Women's Rugby World Cup final.
- (England) Natasha Hunt – Won the 2025 Women's Rugby World Cup while at Gloucester–Hartpury.
- Jade Shekells – part of the wider England squad that won the 2025 Women's Rugby World Cup while at Gloucester–Hartpury.
- Emma Sing – part of the wider England squad that won the 2025 Women's Rugby World Cup while at Gloucester–Hartpury.
- Mackenzie Carson – part of the wider England squad that won the 2025 Women's Rugby World Cup while at Gloucester–Hartpury.

=== Rugby World Cup ===
The following are players who have represented their countries at the Rugby World Cup whilst playing for Gloucester–Hartpury:

Tournament	Players selected	England players	Other national team players
2021	18	Zoe Aldcroft, Connie Powell, Alex Matthews, Tatyana Heard, Maud Muir	Scotland – Katie Dougan; Wales – Lisa Neumann, Bethan Lewis, Kelsey Jones, Gwen Crabb, Kerin Lake, Lleucu George, Cerys Hale, Hannah Jones, Cara Hope, Siwan Lillicrap (c), Sisilia Tuipulotu; United States – Maya Learned
2025	24	Zoe Aldcroft (c), Mackenzie Carson, Tatyana Heard, Natasha Hunt, Alex Matthews, Maud Muir, Jade Shekells, Emma Sing	Ireland – Neve Jones, Sam Monaghan (cc), Ellena Perry; Scotland – Lisa Cockburn; Wales – Kelsey Jones, Sisilia Tuipulotu, Alaw Pyrs, Kate Williams (cc), Bethan Lewis, Seren Lockwood,Lleucu George, Hannah Dallavalle, Nel Metcalfe, Gwen Crabb, Megan Davies, Catherine Richards

== Sources ==
- Collier, Chris; King, Malc; Williams, Dick (2023). 150 Years of Gloucester Rugby. Hobnob Press. ISBN 978-1-914407-63-5.
