= Mia Venner =

English rugby union player (born 2002)

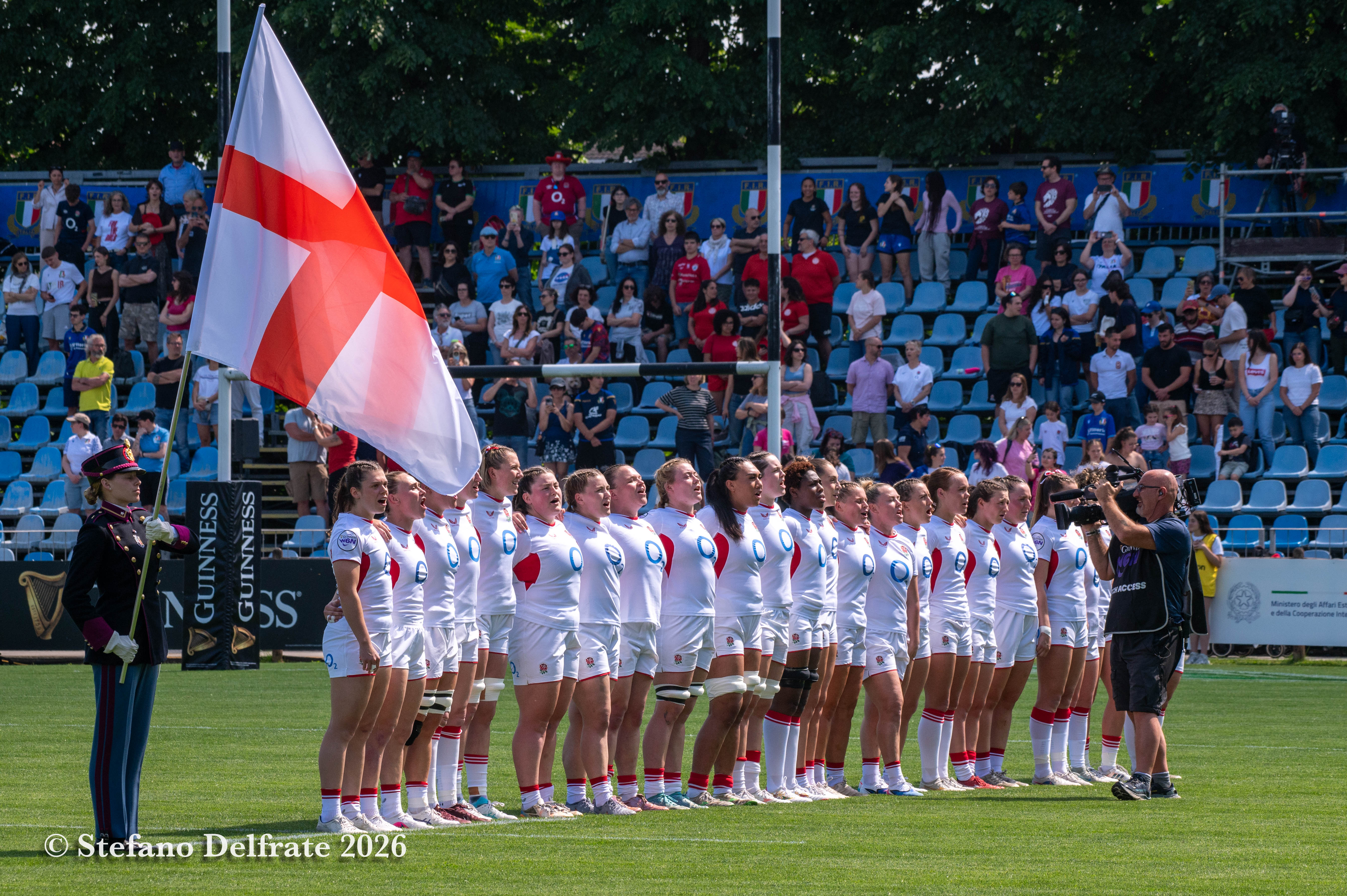
- Venner in 2026
- Born: 3 May 2002 (age 24)
- Height: 1.65 m (5 ft 5 in)
- Weight: 66 kg (146 lb)
- School: Wallingford School
- University: Hartpury University

Rugby union career
- Position(s): Full-back; Wing
- Current team: Gloucester-Hartpury
Senior career
| Years | Team | Apps | (Points) |
| 2019– | Gloucester-Hartpury | | (0) |
International career
| Years | Team | Apps | (Points) |
| 2020– | England | 4 | (15) |

Mia Venner (born 3 May 2002) is an English rugby union footballer who plays at full-back or wing for Premiership Women's Rugby side Gloucester-Hartpury and England.

== Club career ==
Venner made her Gloucester-Hartpury debut in October 2019, scoring a hat-trick on debut against Worcester Warriors in the Premier 15s.

She was a part of the squad that won the 2022–23 Premier 15s title.

She was a try-scorer as Gloucester-Hartpury successfully defended their Premiership Women's Rugby title with a win over Bristol Bears Women in the PWR Final in June 2024.

On 16 March 2025, she scored a try in the final against Saracens Women as Gloucester-Hartpury won a third consecutive title with a 34-19 win. Venner’s try scoring reached double figures for the side during the 2025-26 season and she was named in the Rugby Players' Association’s Under-23 Team of the Season having ultimately finished joint top of the season's PWR try-scoring charts.

== International career ==
Venner is an England international, receiving her first call-up at the age of 17 in March 2020. She made her England debut that month during the 2020 Women's Six Nations Championship against Wales in a 66–7 victory at the Stoop.

She was called up to the England squad in April 2024 for the Six Nations. In June 2024, she was awarded a transition contract with the England rugby union side.

On 17 March 2025, she was selected again in England's squad for the Six Nations Championship. She was given her first start for England and her second international cap in their opening match of the championship against Italy on 23 March 2025. She scored her first international try after three minutes of the match, and set up teammate Emily Scarratt for a try shortly afterwards, as England ran out 38-5 winners.

The following year, Venner scored another try for England in the Six Nations during an 84-7 away win against Scotland on 18 April 2026. She was also a try scorer the following month in the championship in a win away in Italy.

== Personal life ==
She attended Wallingford School in Oxfordshire. She studied business at Hartpury University.
