= Sam Monaghan =

Irish international rugby union player

- Born: 25 June 1993 (age 33) New York City, United States
- Height: 1.8 m (5 ft 11 in)
- Weight: 89 kg (196 lb; 14 st 0 lb)

Rugby union career
- Position: Second Row
- Current team: Gloucester-Hartpury
Amateur team(s)
Years	Team	Apps	(Points)
–2020	Lewes RFC		
Senior career
Years	Team	Apps	(Points)
2020–2022	Wasps		(0)
2022–	Gloucester-Hartpury		(0)
International career
Years	Team	Apps	(Points)
2021–	Ireland	27	(0)
- Correct as of 14 September 2025

Samantha Monaghan (born 25 June 1993), is an Irish rugby union player who plays second row for Gloucester-Hartpury in Premiership Women's Rugby, as well as the Ireland national team.

== Early life ==
Monaghan was born in New York City, United States, to Irish parents. She moved to Ireland at the age of 8. In her youth, she first played Gaelic football and was Irish Under-16 champion with the County Meath team.

== Rugby career ==
She later moved to England, near Brighton. She could not find a Gaelic football club there so she tried rugby union at Lewes RFC mainly to make friends and socialize. At the end of her first season, her coaches advised her to take rugby union more seriously. The following season, her coaches got her in touch with Wasps Women director of rugby Giselle Mather who offered her a trial, Monaghan then went on to sign for Wasps.

In September 2021, she earned her first cap for Ireland in a World Cup qualifying game against Spain. After a stand out 2022 Six Nations performance, Monaghan signed for Gloucester-Hartpury ahead of the 2022–23 Premier 15s season. In her first season at Gloucester-Hartpury, she helped lift the league title, was named Irish Player of the year, and signed a contract extension with Gloucester-Hartpury.

In October 2023, Monaghan was selected for the first WXV 3 tournament, she was co-captain of the team alongside Edel McMahon. Ireland went on to lift the title.

In January 2024, she fainted in the changing room following a winning match against Saracens, the medical staff diagnosed a concussion that had not been spotted during the game. She then went two months without playing, which she described as very difficult. She also lifted the league title for the second year In a row, however during the final she suffered a serious knee injury which meant she could not take park in the 2024 WXV.

On 11 August 2025, she made the Irish squad to the Rugby World Cup in England.
