= Abbie Ward =

England international rugby union player

- Born: 27 March 1993 (age 33) Dumfries, Scotland
- Height: 1.81 m (5 ft 11 1/2 in)
- Weight: 78 kg (172 lb; 12 st 4 lb)

Rugby union career
- Position: Lock
Senior career
Years	Team	Apps	(Points)
2014–2017	DMP Sharks		
2017–2021	Harlequins Women	48	
2021–present	Bristol Bears Women		
International career
Years	Team	Apps	(Points)
2011–2013	England U20s		
2015–	England	81	(110)
Medal record
Representing England
Women's rugby union
Rugby World Cup
Gold medal – first place	2025 England	Team competition
Silver medal – second place	2021 New Zealand	Team competition
Silver medal – second place	2017 Ireland	Team competition

Abbie Ward (née Scott, born 27 March 1993) is a British rugby union player. She plays at international level for England, having made her debut for the side in 2015. She currently plays for Bristol Bears Women at club level.

== International career ==
Ward progressed through the England rugby training groups as a teenager and was part of the Under 20s England women's rugby team that won the U20 Nations Cup in 2011.

She made her debut for the England seniors team in 2015, playing against Italy.

Ward is a world cup finalist after being named in the 2017 Women's Rugby World Cup squad for England. She started in the final game versus New Zealand. In 2018, she played all England games at the 2018 Women's Six Nations Championship.

The following year she was offered a full-time contract with the England team, and went on to help England win the 2019 Women's Six Nations Grand Slam. That summer, she also played for England in the 2019 Super Series, captaining the side for its match versus the USA.

A hip injury in 2019 meant that Ward was expected to miss the entirety of the 2020 Women's Six Nations. However, several games of the tournament were postponed due to the COVID-19 pandemic and she was able to play in England's game against Italy in November 2020. The game enabled England to win the Grand Slam and Ward was named Player of the Match.

She was named in the England squad for the delayed 2021 Rugby World Cup held in New Zealand in October and November 2022. She was called into the Red Roses side for the 2025 Six Nations Championship on 17 March. She was also named in the side for the Women's Rugby World Cup.

== Club career ==
Ward spent the summer of 2014 playing for the Strathcona Druids in Canada. The same year, she joined the Darlington Mowden Park Sharks before moving to the Harlequins Women in 2017.

In October 2020 she returned from a hip injury to score a hat-trick of tries in Harlequins' match against DMP Durham Sharks, helping the team win 103–0. She and the team eventually on to win the league for the first time beating defending champions Saracens 25–17.

On 16 June 2021, it was announced that Ward would sign with Bristol Bears who had appointed husband Dave as head coach.

== Early life and education ==
Ward was born in Dumfries, Scotland, but grew up in Keswick, Cumbria. She first played rugby at age 10 and attended Keswick School and Sedbergh School before gaining a BA in History and Politics and an MSc in Sports Coaching at Northumbria University.

She has three brothers: Fraser, James and David. James has represented Great Britain as a downhill mountain biker.

In August 2020, she married former Harlequins hooker Dave Ward.

== Honours ==
England

- Women's Rugby World Cup
  - (gold) Champion (1): 2025
