= Hannah Jones (rugby union) =

Wales international rugby union footballer

Hannah Dallavalle
- Born: 14 November 1996 (age 29) Swansea, South Wales
- Height: 163 cm (5 ft 4 in)
- Weight: 66 kg (146 lb)
- School: Amman Valley Comprehensive School
- University: Hartpury College

Rugby union career
- Position: Centre
- Current team: Gloucester-Hartpury
Senior career
Years	Team	Apps	(Points)
2019-present	Gloucester-Hartpury		(0)
International career
Years	Team	Apps	(Points)
2015–present	Wales	69	(25)
- Correct as of 24 September 2025

Hannah Joan Dallavalle (née Jones; born 14 November 1996) is a Welsh Rugby Union professional player who plays centre for the Wales women's national rugby union team and Gloucester-Hartpury. She made her debut for the Wales national squad in 2015 and represented them at the 2021 Women's Six Nations Championship.

== Club career ==
Jones began playing rugby at the age of seven, initially as part of a mixed team at Crynant RFC. She then played for her primary and secondary school teams and her university women's rugby team, before signing with Gloucester-Hartpury in 2019.

== International career ==
Jones was called up to the Wales women's squad for both the 2013 and 2014 Women's Six Nations Championships but did not receive any play time during either tournament.

She made her international debut against Scotland in 2015, where she scored her first international try at The Gnoll. She then made her first start in the Six Nations in the opening game against Ireland in 2016.

In January 2017, she was named in the Wales Women squad for the 2017 Six Nations with her performance subsequently securing her name in the Wales squad for the 2019, and later for the 2020, Championship.

Jones represented Wales in the 2021 Women's Six Nations Championship, where she also captained the squad's match against Scotland after skipper Siwan Lillicrap was benched due to injury.

In 2019, following Rugby Europe Grand Prix Series tournaments in France and Ukraine, Jones and Wales teammate Jasmine Joyce travelled to Australia to work on their sevens rugby skills. Jones' hard work paid off, and thanks to the six months she spent playing professional sevens in Australia, she was named in the 19-woman GB Sevens training squad for the 2021 Olympic Games in Japan.

She was selected in Wales squad for the 2021 Rugby World Cup in New Zealand. She was named in the Welsh side for the 2025 Six Nations Championship on 4 March 2025.

On 11 August 2025, she was selected in the Welsh squad to the Women's Rugby World Cup in England.

== Personal life ==
Jones was born in Singleton Hospital, Swansea. As a child she attended Brynaman Primary School, followed by Amman Valley Comprehensive School. She then attended Hartpury College, which allowed her to combine rugby training with a degree in sports therapy.

Alongside playing for the Great Britains sevens team, Jones is training to become a PE teacher.
