= Jade Shekells =

English rugby union and sevens player

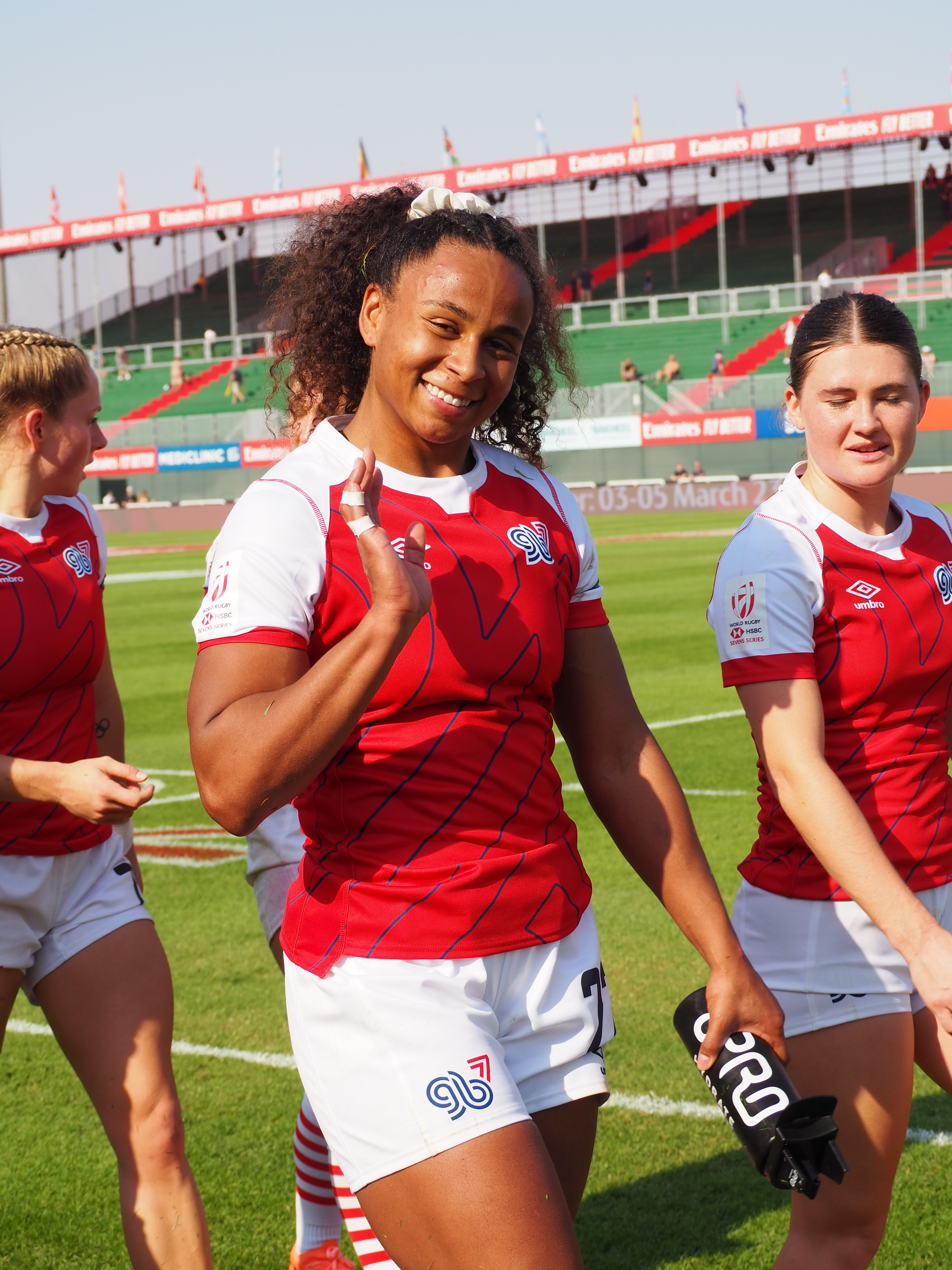
- Shekells during 2022 Dubai 7's
- Born: 28 September 1996 (age 30) Worcester, England
- Height: 167 cm (5 ft 6 in)
- Weight: 74 kg (163 lb; 11 st 9 lb)

Rugby union career
- Position: Outside Centre
Senior career
Years	Team	Apps	(Points)
	Worcester Warriors		(0)
2024–	Gloucester–Hartpury		(0)
International career
Years	Team	Apps	(Points)
2025–	England	4	(5)
National sevens teams
Years	Team		Comps
2022–2023	England 7s		
2023–	Great Britain 7s		
Medal record
Representing Great Britain
Women's rugby sevens
European Games
Gold medal – first place	2023 Kraków–Małopolska	Team competition
Representing England
Women's rugby union
Rugby World Cup
Gold medal – first place	2025 England	Team competition

Jade Shekells (born 28 September 1996) is an English rugby union and sevens player. She plays for England women's fifteens team internationally and for Gloucester–Hartpury. She plays for the Great Britain women's national rugby sevens team, and has also played for England sevens and Worcester Warriors.

== Career ==
Shekells attended Hartpury College before going to Cardiff Met University, where she was called up to the England U20s. After returning to her midlands base, Shekells was the Worcester Warriors player of the season for 2020–21.

She was called up by England sevens in the spring of 2022, ahead of the Rugby Europe Series in Budapest. She was selected to play for England at the 2022 Commonwealth Games. She was also named in England's squad for the Rugby World Cup Sevens that was held in Cape Town, South Africa in September 2022.

Shekells was also selected as a member of the Great Britain sevens squad for the 2023 European Games. Great Britain won a gold medal at the event and sealed qualification for the 2024 Olympic Games. In June 2024, she was named in the British squad for the Olympic Games where the team finished seventh. She was selected for the Great Britain national rugby sevens team for the 2024-25 SVNS series which began at the Dubai Sevens on 30 November 2024.

She joined Gloucester–Hartpury ahead of the 2024–2025 PWR season. In March 2025, she was called into the senior 15-a-side England team for the first time, ahead of the Women's Six Nations Championship. She was named on the bench for their opening tie in the Six Nations against Italy, making her debut in a 38–5 victory. In July 2025, she was named in the England squad for the 2025 Rugby World Cup.

== Honours ==
England

- Women's Rugby World Cup
  - (gold) Champion (1): 2025
