= Rachael Burford =

England rugby player (born 1986)

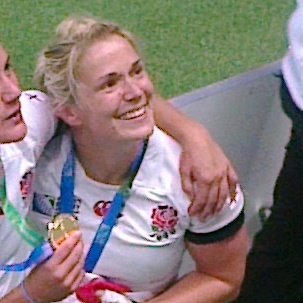
- Burford on winning the 2014 Rugby World Cup
- Born: 19 August 1986 (age 40) Medway, Kent, England
- Height: 1.65 m (5 ft 5 in)
- Weight: 70 kg (150 lb; 11 st 0 lb)

Rugby union career
- Position: Centre
Amateur team(s)
Years	Team	Apps	(Points)
- Medway
Senior career
Years	Team	Apps	(Points)
2017-2024	Harlequins		
2016-2017	Aylesford Bulls		
2016-2012	Thurrock T-Birds		
2009-2012	Richmond F.C.		
2006-2006	Saracens		
2004-2006	Henley		
International career
Years	Team	Apps	(Points)
2006–2019	England	84	(52)
National sevens team
Years	Team		Comps
2009, 2013	England		
Medal record
Representing England
Women's rugby union
Rugby World Cup
Gold medal – first place	2014 France	Team competition
Silver medal – second place	2017 Ireland	Team competition
Silver medal – second place	2010 England	Team competition
Silver medal – second place	2006 Canada	Team competition

Rachael Burford (born 19 August 1986) is an English rugby union player. She represented England at the 2006, 2010, 2014 and 2017 Women's Rugby World Cups. She was a member of the squad which went to the 2013 Rugby World Cup Sevens.

In May 2014, Burford was awarded the Rugby Players' Association England women's player of the year award.

Off the field, Rachael has been a trailblazer for women’s rugby, serving on World Rugby’s Rugby Committees across all areas of the game and becoming the first women’s player on the RPA Players’ Board in 2015. She was appointed as Head of Women’s Rugby for the International Rugby Players in March 2021. She joined the RPA as Head of Women's Rugby in July 2024.
