= Lleucu George =

Welsh international rugby union player

- Born: 12 January 2000 (age 26) Haverfordwest, Pembrokeshire
- Height: 163 cm (5 ft 4 in)
- Weight: 85 kg (187 lb)

Rugby union career
- Position: Fly-half
- Current team: Gloucester-Hartpury
Amateur team(s)
Years	Team	Apps	(Points)
–	Crymych RFC	–	(–)
–	Whitland RFC	–	(–)
Senior career
Years	Team	Apps	(Points)
2019–	Gloucester-Hartpury		
International career
Years	Team	Apps	(Points)
2018–	Wales	35	(15)
- Correct as of 24 September 2025
National sevens team
Years	Team		Comps
- Wales U18 7s

Lleucu Fflur George (born 12 January 2000) is a professional Welsh rugby union player who plays fly-half for the Wales women's national rugby union team and Gloucester-Hartpury in Premiership Women's Rugby.

== Early life and career ==
George is a Pembrokeshire native and grew up on a dairy farm where she "spent her childhood looking after the calves in the early hours of the morning before school". She started her career playing for a boys' team at the Pembrokeshire club, Crymych RFC. She played in the boys' team until she was 12, then joined the girls' side.

== Rugby career ==
George first played for Wales as a blindside flanker at just 17 years old. She has since moved to the back line and plays at either fly-half or centre. She is also an accomplished goal-kicker, she kicked a last minute conversion and helped Wales clinch a Six Nations victory over Scotland in 2019.

She joined Gloucester-Hartpury in 2019.

In 2024, she received a knee injury from an awkward fall during their match against Italy at the WXV 2 tournament in Cape Town, South Africa. She was ruled out of the side's final game against Japan. Although she was flown back to Wales for treatment, scans showed that her injury was not as serious as initially thought.

In 2025, George won a third Premiership Women's Rugby title with Gloucester-Hartpury under the guidance of Sean Lynn, who also happens to be her national coach. She was subsequently named in the Wales side for the 2025 Six Nations Championship in March.

On 11 August 2025, she was selected in the Welsh squad to the Women's Rugby World Cup in England.
