= Aylesford Bulls Ladies =

- Full name: Aylesford Bulls Ladies Rugby Football Club
- Union: RFU
- Founded: 1998

Aylesford Bulls Ladies Rugby Football Club were a women's rugby union club based in Aylesford, Kent, England. They played in the Women's Premiership. They were founded in 1998 and were the ladies team of Aylesford Bulls. Following an agreement with Harlequins, Aylesford Bulls initially received support from them however in 2017, they were taken over to become Harlequins Ladies.

== History ==
In 2006, Aylesford were promoted into Championship 2 South East after finishing top of their previous league unbeaten. Also in 2006, their captain Natalie Garrett died of cancer. As part of a tribute, Aylesford Bulls have had NJG imprinted onto their playing shirts. In 2008, Aylesford were invited to participate in the Dubai Exiles Rugby 7s where they played the England women's national rugby sevens team. They were almost relegated in 2010, which led to an overhaul in the way the team was managed. This included inviting Germany women's national rugby union team head coach, Susanne Wiedemann to coach them. The next year, they were promoted into Championship 1 after defeating Plymouth Albion Ladies in a promotion playoff. In 2013, Aylesford defeated Thurrock T-Birds in the promotion play-off to be promoted into the Women's Premiership for the first time. The next season, they took part in the first Women's Kent Cup.

In 2017, Aylesford Bulls Ladies won the final Women's Premiership before the introduction of the Premier 15s league. Following this victory, Harlequins Ladies took over the team fully and took their position in the new league.

== Notable former players ==
England

- Rachael Burford
- Justine Lucas
- Leanne Riley
- Catherine Spencer

Ireland

- Sene Naoupu

United States

- Jess Wooden

Italy

- Michela Sillari
