= Lucy Packer =

England international rugby union player

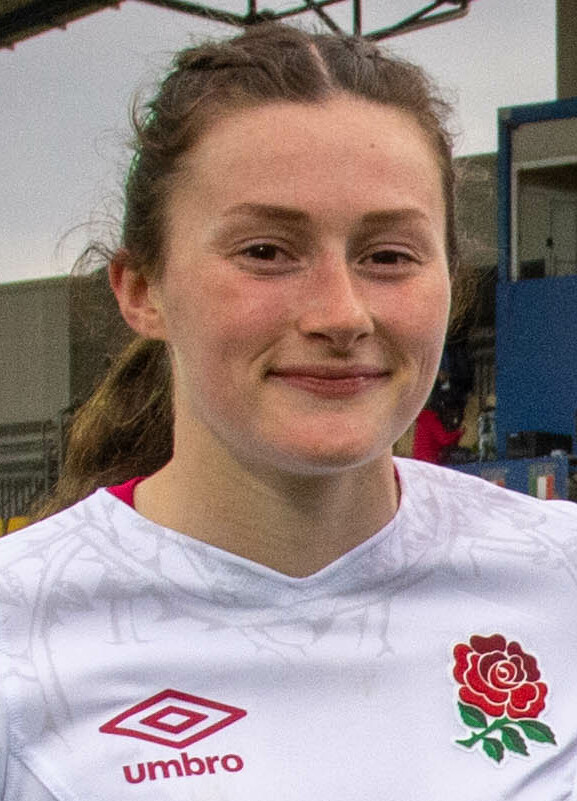
- Packer with England in 2022
- Full name: Lucy Francesca A. J. Packer
- Born: 2 February 2000 (age 26) Ammanford
- Height: 161 cm (5 ft 3 in)
- Weight: 55 kg (121 lb; 8 st 9 lb)
- School: Ysgol Dyffryn Aman
- University: University of Surrey

Rugby union career
- Position: Scrumhalf
- Current team: Harlequins
Senior career
| Years | Team | Apps | (Points) |
| 2018– | Harlequins | | |
International career
| Years | Team | Apps | (Points) |
| 2019– | England | 39 | (20) |
National sevens team
| Years | Team | | Comps |
| 2018 | Wales | | |
Medal record
Representing England
Women's rugby union
Rugby World Cup
| Gold medal – first place | 2025 England | Team competition |
| Silver medal – second place | 2021 New Zealand | Team competition |

Lucy Francesca A. J. Packer (born 2 February 2000) is an English rugby union player. She is a member of the England women's national rugby union team and plays for Harlequins at club level, but has previously represented Wales in rugby sevens.

== International career ==
Packer made her debut for England off the bench against the USA in November 2021.

In September 2022, Packer was named in the England squad for the COVID-delayed 2021 Rugby World Cup.

She was called up into England's squad for the 2025 Women's Six Nations Championship. She was named in the Red Roses squad for the Women's Rugby World Cup.

== Club career ==
Packer signed with Harlequins in 2018 and was part of their title-winning 2020–21 squad.

== Early life and education ==
Packer grew up in Ammanford, where she attended Ysgol Dyffryn Aman, She played for Amman Utd and Cardiff Quins. She is currently studying biochemistry at the University of Surrey. She is distantly related to rugby legend Adrian Stoop.

== Honours ==
England

- Women's Rugby World Cup
  - (gold) Champion (1): 2025
