= England women's national rugby union team =

England
- Nickname: Red Roses
- Emblem: Red rose
- Union: Rugby Football Union
- Head coach: John Mitchell
- Captain: Megan Jones
- Most caps: Sarah Hunter (141)
- Top scorer: Emily Scarratt (754)
- Top try scorer: Sue Day (61)
- Home stadium: Twickenham Stadium and others (Note: The England women's team uses a variety of venues around England, to promote women's rugby to a wider audience. Twickenham is typically used for games of major importance.)
| First colours | Second colours |

World Rugby ranking
- Current: 1 (as of 2 October 2025)
- Highest: 1 (2012–2013, 2014–2015, 2017, 2020–)
- Lowest: 4 (2015)

First international
- Wales 4–22 England (Pontypool, Wales; 5 April 1987)

Biggest win
- England 101–0 South Africa (East Molesey, England; 14 May 2005)

Biggest defeat
- New Zealand 67–0 England (Burnham, New Zealand; 13 August 1997)

World Cup
- Appearances: 9 (First in 1991)
- Best result: Champions: (1994, 2014, 2025)
- Website: England Rugby

The England women's national rugby union team, commonly known as the Red Roses, represents England in women's international rugby union. They compete in the annual Women's Six Nations Championship with France, Ireland, Italy, Scotland and Wales. England have won the championship on a total of 22 out of 31 occasions – winning the Grand Slam 20 times and the Triple Crown 26 times – making them the most successful side in the tournament's history. They have won the Women's Rugby World Cup on three occasions (1994, 2014, and 2025), and have been runners-up on six other occasions. Their current permanent head coach since October 2023 is John Mitchell. They currently hold the longest ever winning streak in rugby, with 39 consecutive wins as of September 2026.

== History ==
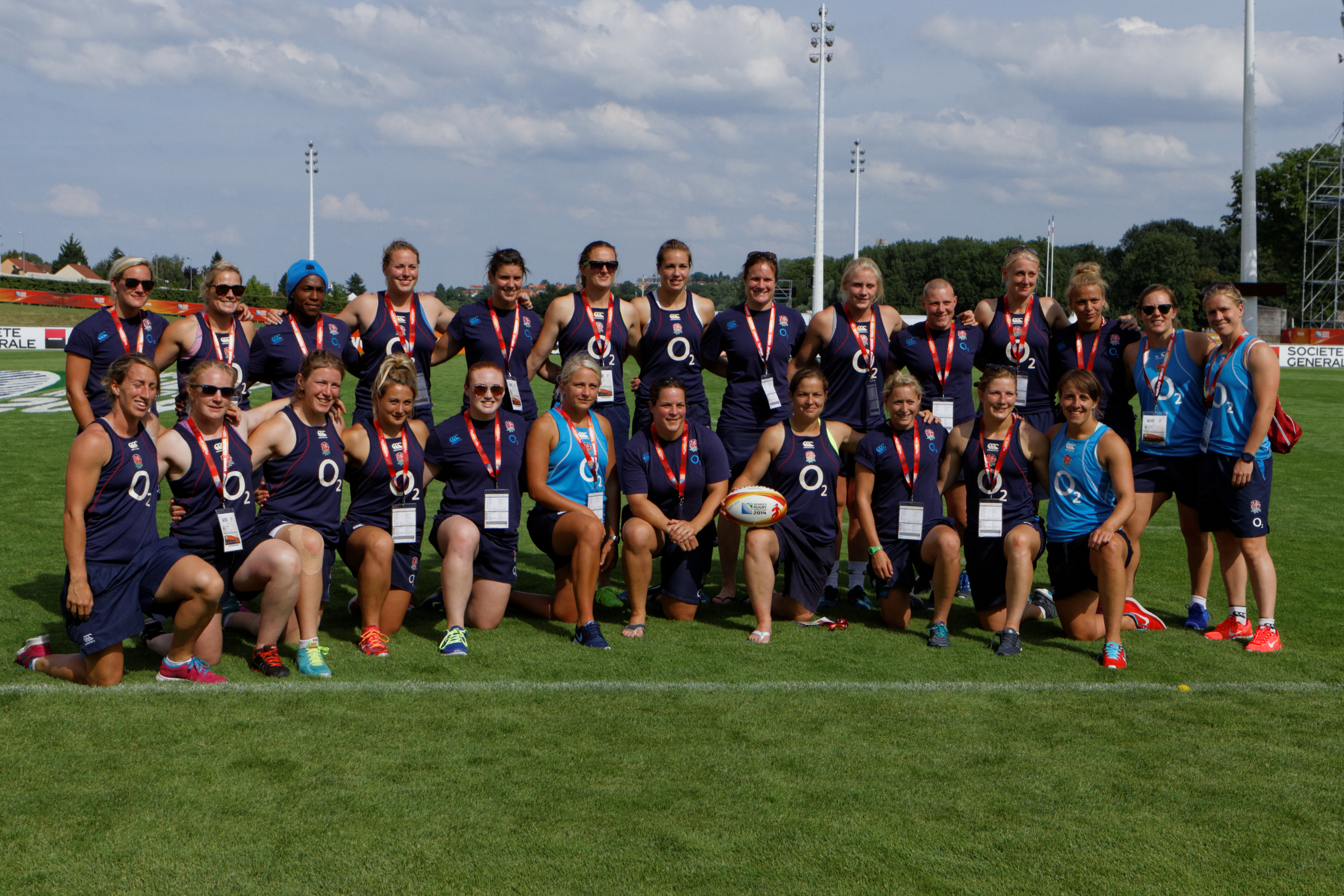
England at the 2014 Women's Rugby World Cup.

Until 2009, the badge and logo of England women's national teams was significantly different from that worn by men's teams. However, in 2009 in anticipation of the merger between the Rugby Football Union and Rugby Football Union for Women England teams adopted the men's rose.

England have taken part in every Women's Rugby World Cup competition, winning in 1994, 2014 and 2025, they have finished as runner-up on six other occasions.

The 1995/1996 season saw the introduction of a Home Nations Championship between England, Ireland, Scotland and Wales, which England won in its inaugural year. England won the Championship every year, except for the 1997/98 season when it was won by Scotland.

France joined the competition in the 1998/99 season, making it the Five Nations Championship, with England achieving the Grand Slam in three successive seasons.

In the 2001/02 season, Ireland re-joined the fold in preparation for the World Cup and the competition expanded to be known as the Six Nations. Since then, England have finished lower than runner-up on only 2 occasions, in 2013 and 2015 respectively, and have won the title on 16 separate occasions. This includes 7 consecutive tournament triumphs between 2006 and 2012, and between 2019–2025 and the Grand Slam on 14 more occasions, including 3 times in a row between 2006–2008 and 2010–2012, and 5 in a row from 2022 to 2026.

== Team records ==
Women's World Rugby Rankings Top 20 rankings as of 2 November 2026
| Rank | Change* | Team | Points |
|---|---|---|---|
| 1 | Steady | England | 94.20 |
| 2 | Steady | New Zealand | 93.18 |
| 3 | Steady | Canada | 91.68 |
| 4 | Steady | France | 85.00 |
| 5 | Steady | Ireland | 78.29 |
| 6 | Steady | United States | 77.50 |
| 7 | Steady | Australia | 77.18 |
| 8 | Steady | Italy | 71.99 |
| 9 | Steady | Scotland | 71.25 |
| 10 | Steady | South Africa | 70.76 |
| 11 | Steady | Wales | 70.12 |
| 12 | Steady | Fiji | 66.65 |
| 13 | Steady | Japan | 65.00 |
| 14 | Steady | Spain | 63.22 |
| 15 | Steady | Samoa | 58.31 |
| 16 | Steady | Netherlands | 58.29 |
| 17 | Steady | Hong Kong | 55.72 |
| 18 | Steady | Russia | 55.10 |
| 19 | Steady | Kazakhstan | 53.95 |
| 20 | Steady | Germany | 51.12 |
*Change from the previous ranking update

=== Overall ===
Full internationals only

Correct as of 9 August 2025

| Opponent | First game | Played | Won | Drawn | Lost | Win % |
|---|---|---|---|---|---|---|
| Australia | 1998 | 7 | 7 | 0 | 0 | 100% |
| Canada | 1993 | 37 | 33 | 1 | 3 | 89.19% |
| Fiji | 2022 | 1 | 1 | 0 | 0 | 100% |
| France | 1991 | 58 | 45 | 0 | 13 | 77.59% |
| Germany | 1997 | 1 | 1 | 0 | 0 | 100% |
| Ireland | 1996 | 33 | 31 | 0 | 2 | 93.94% |
| Italy | 1991 | 26 | 26 | 0 | 0 | 100% |
| Kazakhstan | 2000 | 3 | 3 | 0 | 0 | 100% |
| Netherlands | 1990 | 4 | 4 | 0 | 0 | 100% |
| New Zealand | 1997 | 33 | 13 | 1 | 19 | 39.39% |
| Russia | 1994 | 2 | 2 | 0 | 0 | 100% |
| Samoa | 2005 | 2 | 2 | 0 | 0 | 100% |
| Scotland | 1994 | 34 | 32 | 0 | 2 | 94.12% |
| South Africa | 2005 | 6 | 6 | 0 | 0 | 100% |
| Spain | 1991 | 17 | 15 | 1 | 1 | 88.24% |
| Sweden | 1988 | 3 | 3 | 0 | 0 | 100% |
| United States | 1991 | 21 | 20 | 0 | 1 | 95.24% |
| Wales | 1987 | 42 | 40 | 0 | 2 | 95.24% |
| Total | 1987 | 330 | 284 | 3 | 43 | 86.06% |

=== World Cup ===
Rugby World Cup record
| Year | Round | Pld | W | D | L | PF | PA | Squad | Head coach |
|---|---|---|---|---|---|---|---|---|---|
| (Wales) 1991 | Runners–up | 4 | 3 | 0 | 1 | 56 | 28 | Squad | S. Dowling |
| (Scotland) 1994 | Champions | 5 | 5 | 0 | 0 | 172 | 39 | Squad | S. Dowling |
| (Netherlands) 1998 | Third place | 5 | 4 | 0 | 1 | 219 | 78 | Squad | E. Field |
| (Spain) 2002 | Runners–up | 4 | 3 | 0 | 1 | 138 | 37 | Squad | G. Richards |
| (Canada) 2006 | Runners–up | 5 | 4 | 0 | 1 | 146 | 47 | Squad | G. Richards |
| (England) 2010 | Runners–up | 5 | 4 | 0 | 1 | 171 | 23 | Squad | G. Street |
| (France) 2014 | Champions | 5 | 4 | 1 | 0 | 184 | 37 | Squad | G. Street |
| (Ireland) 2017 | Runners–up | 5 | 4 | 0 | 1 | 211 | 88 | Squad | S. Middleton |
| (New Zealand) 2021 | Runners–up | 6 | 5 | 0 | 1 | 270 | 84 | Squad | S. Middleton |
| (England) 2025 | Champions | 6 | 6 | 0 | 0 | 316 | 55 | Squad | J. Mitchell |
| (Australia) 2029 | Qualified as 2025 Women's Rugby World Cup semi-finalists | | | | | | | | |
| (United States) 2033 | To be determined | | | | | | | | |
| Total | Champions (3)^{†} | 50 | 42 | 1 | 7 | 1803 | 506 | — | |
Champion Runner-up Third place Fourth place: * Tied placing ^{†} Best placing / Home venue

=== Six Nations ===
| | England | France | Ireland | Italy | Scotland | Spain | Wales |
|---|---|---|---|---|---|---|---|
| Tournaments | 31 | 28 | 29 | 20 | 31 | 7 | 31 |
| Outright Wins | 22 | 6 | 2 | 0 | 1 | 0 | 0 |
| Grand Slams | 20 | 5 | 1 | 0 | 1 | 0 | 0 |
| Triple Crowns | 26 | —N/a | 2 | —N/a | 1 | —N/a | 1 |
| Wooden Spoons | 0 | 0 | 6 | 3 | 9 | 2 | 10 |

== Players ==
=== Current squad ===
On 19 March 2026, head coach John Mitchell announced England's 38-player squad for the 2026 Six Nations Championship. The squad included 25 previous Rugby World Cup winners, as well as seven uncapped players.

Note: The age and number of caps listed for each player is as of 11 April 2026, the first day of the tournament.

| Player | Position | Date of birth (age) | Caps | Club/province |
|---|---|---|---|---|
| May Campbell | Hooker | 16 May 1996 (aged 29) | 5 | (England) Saracens |
| Amy Cokayne | Hooker | 11 July 1996 (aged 29) | 89 | (England) Sale Sharks |
| Connie Powell | Hooker | 13 July 2000 (aged 25) | 19 | (England) Harlequins |
| Sarah Bern | Prop | 10 July 1997 (aged 28) | 79 | (England) Bristol Bears |
| Hannah Botterman | Prop | 8 June 1999 (aged 26) | 62 | (England) Bristol Bears |
| Mackenzie Carson | Prop | 24 June 1998 (aged 27) | 23 | (England) Gloucester–Hartpury |
| Kelsey Clifford | Prop | 11 December 2001 (aged 24) | 21 | (England) Saracens |
| Lizzie Hanlon | Prop | 30 July 2001 (aged 24) | 1 | (England) Harlequins |
| Annabel Meta | Prop | 11 August 2005 (aged 20) | 0 | (England) Trailfinders |
| Maud Muir | Prop | 12 July 2001 (aged 24) | 48 | (England) Gloucester–Hartpury |
| Christiana Balogun | Second row | 2 October 1997 (aged 28) | 0 | (England) Bristol Bears |
| Lilli Ives Campion | Second row | 10 October 2003 (aged 22) | 5 | (England) Loughborough Lightning |
| Demelza Short | Second row | 28 November 2006 (aged 19) | 0 | (England) Bristol Bears |
| Morwenna Talling | Second row | 5 August 2002 (aged 23) | 28 | (England) Sale Sharks |
| Jodie Verghese | Second row | 9 January 2003 (aged 23) | 0 | (England) Saracens |
| Abi Burton | Back row | 9 March 2000 (aged 26) | 4 | (England) Trailfinders |
| Maddie Feaunati | Back row | 18 May 2002 (aged 23) | 23 | (England) Exeter Chiefs |
| Daisy Hibbert-Jones | Back row | 23 October 2002 (aged 23) | 1 | (England) Loughborough Lightning |
| Sadia Kabeya | Back row | 22 February 2002 (aged 24) | 28 | (England) Loughborough Lightning |
| Haineala Lutui | Back row | 8 August 2006 (aged 19) | 0 | (England) Loughborough Lightning |
| Alex Matthews | Back row | 3 August 1993 (aged 32) | 81 | (England) Gloucester–Hartpury |
| Marlie Packer | Back row | 2 October 1989 (aged 36) | 112 | (England) Saracens |
| Natasha Hunt | Scrum-half | 21 March 1989 (aged 37) | 88 | (England) Gloucester–Hartpury |
| Lucy Packer | Scrum-half | 2 February 2000 (aged 26) | 38 | (England) Harlequins |
| Flo Robinson | Scrum-half | 4 October 2001 (aged 24) | 1 | (England) Exeter Chiefs |
| Holly Aitchison | Fly-half | 13 September 1997 (aged 28) | 44 | (England) Sale Sharks |
| Zoe Harrison | Fly-half | 14 April 1998 (aged 27) | 65 | (England) Saracens |
| Tatyana Heard | Centre | 14 January 1995 (aged 31) | 36 | (England) Gloucester–Hartpury |
| Megan Jones (c) | Centre | 28 October 1996 (aged 29) | 33 | (England) Trailfinders |
| Sarah Parry | Centre | 21 October 2005 (aged 20) | 0 | (England) Harlequins |
| Helena Rowland | Centre | 19 September 1999 (aged 26) | 46 | (England) Loughborough Lightning |
| Jess Breach | Wing | 4 November 1997 (aged 28) | 53 | (England) Saracens |
| Millie David | Wing | 15 June 2005 (aged 20) | 0 | (England) Bristol Bears |
| Claudia Moloney-MacDonald | Wing | 4 January 1996 (aged 30) | 36 | (England) Exeter Chiefs |
| Mia Venner | Wing | 3 May 2002 (aged 23) | 2 | (England) Gloucester–Hartpury |
| Bo Westcombe-Evans | Wing | 19 June 2002 (aged 23) | 2 | (England) Loughborough Lightning |
| Ellie Kildunne | Fullback | 8 September 1999 (aged 26) | 57 | (England) Harlequins |
| Emma Sing | Fullback | 11 March 2001 (aged 25) | 13 | (England) Gloucester–Hartpury |

=== Contracted players ===
On 31 July 2026, the RFU confirmed it had awarded full-time central contracts to 32 England senior players for the 2026–27 season, with an additional 6 players receiving transition contracts.

Red Roses Contracted Players (2026–27)
| Props: Sarah Bern; Hannah Botterman; Mackenzie Carson; Kelsey Clifford; Maud Muir; Hookers: Lark Atkin-Davies; May Campbell; Amy Cokayne; Locks: Lilli Ives Campion; Rosie Galligan; Zoe Stratford; Morwenna Talling; Abbie Ward | Back row: Abi Burton; Maddie Feaunati; Sadia Kabeya; Alex Matthews; Marlie Packer; Scrum-halves: Flo Robinson; Natasha Hunt; Lucy Packer; Fly-halves: Holly Aitchison; Zoe Harrison | Centres: Tatyana Heard; Meg Jones; Helena Rowland; Jade Shekells; Wings: Jess Breach; Claudia Moloney-MacDonald; Mia Venner; Full-backs: Ellie Kildunne; Emma Sing | Transition players: Millie David; Hayley Jones; Haineala Lutui; Annabel Meta; Sarah Parry; Demelza Short |

== Individual records ==
=== World Rugby Awards ===
The following England players have been recognised at the World Rugby Awards since 2001:

World Rugby Women's 15s Player of the Year
| Year | Nominees | Winners |
|---|---|---|
| 2001 | Shelley Rae | **Shelley Rae** |
| 2006 | Maggie Alphonsi | **Maggie Alphonsi** |
| 2008 | Carol Isherwood | **Carol Isherwood** |
| 2010 | Maggie Alphonsi (2) | — |
| 2010 | Danielle Waterman | — |
| 2012 | Michaela Staniford | **Michaela Staniford** |
| 2016 | Sarah Hunter | **Sarah Hunter** |
| 2019 | Sarah Bern | **Emily Scarratt** |
| 2019 | Katy Daley-McLean | **Emily Scarratt** |
| 2019 | Emily Scarratt | **Emily Scarratt** |
| 2021 | Zoe Aldcroft | **Zoe Aldcroft** |
| 2021 | Poppy Cleall | **Zoe Aldcroft** |
| 2022 | Alex Matthews | — |
| 2023 | Abby Dow | **Marlie Packer** |
| 2023 | Marlie Packer | **Marlie Packer** |
| 2024 | Ellie Kildunne | **Ellie Kildunne** |
| 2024 | Alex Matthews (2) | **Ellie Kildunne** |
| 2025 | Megan Jones | — |
| 2026 | Zoe Harrison | — |
| 2026 | Megan Jones (2) | — |

World Rugby Women's 15s Breakthrough Player of the Year
| Year | Nominees | Winners |
|---|---|---|
| 2022 | Maud Muir | — |
| 2024 | Maddie Feaunati | — |

World Rugby Women's 15s Dream Team of the Year
| Year | Forwards | | Backs | | Total |
| Year | No. | Players | No. | Players | Total |
|---|---|---|---|---|---|
| 2021 | 3. | Sarah Bern | 11. | Abby Dow | 5 |
| 2021 | 5. | Abbie Ward | 11. | Abby Dow | 5 |
| 2021 | 6. | Zoe Aldcroft | 11. | Abby Dow | 5 |
| 2021 | 8. | Poppy Cleall | 11. | Abby Dow | 5 |
| 2022 | 3. | Sarah Bern (2) | 13. | Emily Scarratt | 6 |
| 2022 | 4. | Abbie Ward (2) | 13. | Emily Scarratt | 6 |
| 2022 | 6. | Alex Matthews | 15. | Abby Dow (2) | 6 |
| 2022 | 7. | Marlie Packer | 15. | Abby Dow (2) | 6 |
| 2023 | 2. | Lark Atkin-Davies | 11. | Abby Dow (3) | 7 |
| 2023 | 3. | Sarah Bern (3) | 11. | Abby Dow (3) | 7 |
| 2023 | 4. | Zoe Aldcroft (2) | 15. | Ellie Kildunne | 7 |
| 2023 | 6. | Alex Matthews (2) | 15. | Ellie Kildunne | 7 |
| 2023 | 7. | Marlie Packer (2) | 15. | Ellie Kildunne | 7 |
| 2024 | 3. | Maud Muir | 10. | Holly Aitchison | 6 |
| 2024 | 4. | Zoe Aldcroft (3) | 14. | Abby Dow (4) | 6 |
| 2024 | 8. | Alex Matthews (3) | 15. | Ellie Kildunne (2) | 6 |
| 2025 | 1. | Hannah Botterman | 10. | Zoe Harrison | 7 |
| 2025 | 3. | Maud Muir (2) | 10. | Zoe Harrison | 7 |
| 2025 | 5. | Abbie Ward (3) | 13. | Megan Jones | 7 |
| 2025 | 6. | Alex Matthews (4) | 15. | Ellie Kildunne (3) | 7 |
| 2026 | 1. | Hannah Botterman (2) | 10. | Zoe Harrison (2) | 6 |
| 2026 | 2. | Amy Cokayne | 13. | Megan Jones (2) | 6 |
| 2026 | 6. | Maddie Feaunati | 14. | Jess Breach | 6 |

World Rugby 2010s Team of the Decade (Forwards)
| No. | Players | Positions |
|---|---|---|
| 1. | **Rocky Clark** | Loosehead Prop |
| 3. | **Sophie Hemming** | Tighthead Prop |
| 5. | **Tamara Taylor** | Lock |
| 7. | **Maggie Alphonsi** | Openside Flanker |

World Rugby 2010s Team of the Decade (Backs)
| No. | Players | Positions |
|---|---|---|
| 10. | **Katy Daley-McLean** | Fly-Half |
| 13. | **Emily Scarratt** | Outside Centre |
| 14. | **Lydia Thompson** | Right Wing |
| 15. | **Danielle Waterman** | Full-Back |

World Rugby Women's 15s Try of the Year
| Year | Date | Nominee | Match | Tournament | Winner |
|---|---|---|---|---|---|
| 2021 | 30 April | Abby Dow | vs. France | Exhibition Match | — |
| 2022 | 5 November | Abby Dow (2) | vs. Canada | Rugby World Cup | **Abby Dow** |
| 2023 | 29 April | Zoe Aldcroft | vs. France | Six Nations | — |
| 2025 | 22 August | Jess Breach | vs. United States | Rugby World Cup | — |

=== Hall of famers ===
England have six former players who have been inducted into the World Rugby Hall of Fame:

| Players | Year inducted | Refs |
|---|---|---|
| Carol Isherwood | 2014 | |
| Gill Burns | 2014 | |
| Maggie Alphonsi | 2016 | |
| Sue Dorrington | 2022 | |
| Mary Forsyth | 2022 | |
| Rocky Clark | 2025 | |

=== Six Nations Awards ===
The following England players have been recognised in the Women's Six Nations Awards since 2020:

Six Nations Player of the Championship
| Year | Nominee | Winner |
|---|---|---|
| 2020 | Emily Scarratt | **Emily Scarratt** |
| 2021 | Zoe Aldcroft | **Poppy Cleall** |
| 2021 | Poppy Cleall | **Poppy Cleall** |
| 2022 | Sarah Bern | — |
| 2022 | Marlie Packer | — |
| 2023 | Holly Aitchison | — |
| 2023 | Marlie Packer (2) | — |
| 2024 | Ellie Kildunne | **Ellie Kildunne** |
| 2025 | Abby Dow | — |
| 2026 | Megan Jones | — |

Six Nations Try of the Championship
| Year | Nominee | Match | Winner | Ref |
|---|---|---|---|---|
| 2024 | Abby Dow | vs. Ireland | — | |
| 2024 | Ellie Kildunne | vs. Wales | — | |
| 2025 | Abby Dow (2) | vs. Scotland | — | |
| 2026 | Megan Jones | vs. Wales | **Megan Jones** | |

Six Nations Team of the Championship
| Year | Forwards | | Backs | | Total |
| Year | No. | Players | No. | Players | Total |
|---|---|---|---|---|---|
| 2022 | 3. | Sarah Bern | 14. | Lydia Thompson | 5 |
| 2022 | 6. | Alex Matthews | 14. | Lydia Thompson | 5 |
| 2022 | 7. | Marlie Packer | 15. | Helena Rowland | 5 |
| 2023 | 1. | Hannah Botterman | 10. | Holly Aitchison | 9 |
| 2023 | 4. | Zoe Aldcroft | 10. | Holly Aitchison | 9 |
| 2023 | 5. | Sarah Beckett | 11. | Abby Dow | 9 |
| 2023 | 6. | Sadia Kabeya | 11. | Abby Dow | 9 |
| 2023 | 7. | Marlie Packer (2) | 14. | Jess Breach | 9 |
| 2023 | 8. | Alex Matthews (2) | 14. | Jess Breach | 9 |
| 2024 | 1. | Hannah Botterman (2) | 9. | Natasha Hunt | 9 |
| 2024 | 1. | Hannah Botterman (2) | 10. | Holly Aitchison (2) | 9 |
| 2024 | 3. | Maud Muir | 11. | Abby Dow (2) | 9 |
| 2024 | 5. | Zoe Aldcroft (2) | 13. | Megan Jones | 9 |
| 2024 | 7. | Sadia Kabeya (2) | 15. | Ellie Kildunne | 9 |
| 2025 | 3. | Sarah Bern (2) | 13. | Megan Jones (2) | 4 |
| 2025 | 4. | Abbie Ward | 14. | Abby Dow (3) | 4 |
| 2026 | 2. | Amy Cokayne | 10. | Zoe Harrison | 7 |
| 2026 | 2. | Amy Cokayne | 11. | Jess Breach (2) | 7 |
| 2026 | 3. | Sarah Bern (3) | 13. | Megan Jones (3) | 7 |
| 2026 | 5. | Abi Burton | 15. | Ellie Kildunne (2) | 7 |

Six Nations Rising Player Award
| Year | Nominee | Winner |
|---|---|---|
| 2025 | Abi Burton | — |
| 2025 | Jade Shekells | — |

=== Rugby Players' Association Player of the Year ===
The following players have been voted as the RPA England Player of the Year since 2013:

RPA Player of the Year (2013–17)
| Year | Winners | Ref |
|---|---|---|
| 2013 | Emily Scarratt | |
| 2014 | Rachael Burford | |
| 2015 | Rocky Clark | |
| 2016 | Sarah Hunter | |
| 2017 | Tamara Taylor | |

RPA Player of the Year (2018–22)
| Year | Winners | Ref |
|---|---|---|
| 2018 | Danielle Waterman | |
| 2019 | Sarah Bern | |
| 2020 | Zoe Aldcroft | |
| 2021 | Poppy Cleall | |
| 2022 | Marlie Packer | |

RPA Player of the Year (2023–26)
| Year | Winners | Ref |
|---|---|---|
| 2023 | Sadia Kabeya | |
| 2024 | Alex Matthews | |
| 2025 | Zoe Aldcroft (2) | |
| 2026 | Zoe Harrison | |

RPA Hall of Fame
| Year | Inductees | Ref |
|---|---|---|
| 2021 | Rocky Clark | |
| 2022 | Katy Daley-McLean | |
| 2023 | Sarah Hunter | |

RPA Special Merit Award
| Year | Winners | Ref |
|---|---|---|
| 2023 | Emily Scarratt | |
| 2024 | Marlie Packer | |

=== Statistical leaders ===
Players active at international level as of May 2026 are listed in bold italics.

As of 18 May 2026

Most Caps
| Rank | Player | Caps |
|---|---|---|
| 1. | Sarah Hunter | 141 |
| 2. | Rocky Clark | 137 |
| 3. | Emily Scarratt | 119 |
| 4. | Katy Daley-McLean | 116 |
| 4. | **Marlie Packer** | 116 |
| 5. | Tamara Taylor | 115 |
| 7. | Amy Garnett | 100 |
| 8. | **Amy Cokayne** | 94 |
| 9. | **Mo Hunt** | 89 |
| 10. | Helen Clayton | 87 |

As of 18 May 2026

Most Points
| Rank | Player | Points |
|---|---|---|
| 1. | Emily Scarratt | 754 |
| 2. | Katy Daley-McLean | 542 |
| 3. | Sue Day | 305 |
| 4. | **Zoe Harrison** | 299 |
| 5. | **Marlie Packer** | 295 |
| 6. | Nicola Crawford | 285 |
| 6. | **Jess Breach** | 285 |
| 8. | Shelley Rae | 275 |
| 9. | **Ellie Kildunne** | 260 |
| 10. | Abby Dow | 250 |

As of 18 May 2026

Most Tries
| Rank | Player | Tries |
|---|---|---|
| 1. | Sue Day | 61 |
| 2. | **Marlie Packer** | 59 |
| 3. | Nicola Crawford | 57 |
| 3. | **Jess Breach** | 57 |
| 5. | Emily Scarratt | 54 |
| 6. | **Ellie Kildunne** | 52 |
| 7. | Abby Dow | 50 |
| 8. | Danielle Waterman | 47 |
| 8. | **Amy Cokayne** | 47 |
| 10. | Kat Merchant | 45 |
| 10. | Lydia Thompson | 45 |

== Coaches ==
=== Current coaching staff ===
The following table outlines the current England senior coaching team, as of the 2026 WXV Global Series.

| Nationality | Name | Role |
|---|---|---|
| New Zealand | John Mitchell | Head Coach |
| England | Louis Deacon | Forwards Coach |
| England | Emily Scarratt | Attack Coach |
| England | Sarah Hunter | Defence Coach |
| England | Matt Ferguson | Scrum / Contact Coach |
| England | Andy Holloway | Skills / Kicking Coach |
| England | Shaun Edwards | Coaching Consultant |
| England | Joanne Yapp | Head of Pathways |
| England | Charlie Hayter | Head of Performance |
| England | Ethan Kinney | S&C Coach |

=== Notable former coaches ===
- (England) Gary Street (head coach 2007–15)

1x World Cup winner (2014)
1x World Cup runner-up (2010)
6x Six Nations winner (2007, 2008, 2009, 2010, 2011, 2012)

- (England) Simon Middleton (assistant coach 2014, head coach 2015–23)

1x World Rugby Coach of the Year (2021)
2x World Cup runner-up (2017, 2021)
6x Six Nations winner (2017, 2019, 2020, 2021, 2022, 2023)

== Honours ==
- World Cup

Winners (3): 1994, 2014, 2025
Runners-up (6): 1991, 2002, 2006, 2010, 2017, 2021

- WXV

Winners (2): 2023, 2024

- Six Nations Championship

Winners (22): 1996, 1997, 1999, 2000, 2001, 2003, 2006, 2007, 2008, 2009, 2010, 2011, 2012, 2017, 2019, 2020, 2021, 2022, 2023, 2024, 2025, 2026
Grand Slam (20): 1996, 1997, 1999, 2000, 2001, 2003, 2006, 2007, 2008, 2010, 2011, 2012, 2017, 2019, 2020, 2022, 2023, 2024, 2025, 2026
Triple Crown (26): 1996, 1997, 1999, 2000, 2001, 2002, 2003, 2004, 2005, 2006, 2007, 2008, 2010, 2011, 2012, 2014, 2016, 2017, 2018, 2019, 2020, 2022, 2023, 2024, 2025, 2026

- European Championship

Winners (5): 1997, 2007, 2008, 2011, 2012
Runners-up (1): 2004

== See also ==
- England women's national under-21 rugby union team
