= 2025 Women's Rugby World Cup statistics =

This article documents the statistics of the 2025 Women's Rugby World Cup that was held in England from 22 August to 27 September 2025.

== Team statistics ==
The following table shows the team's results in major statistical categories.

Team statistics
Team	Played	Won	Drawn	Lost	PF	PA	PD	Tries	Cons	Pens	DG	Yellow card	Red card
Australia	4	1	1	2	116	124	–8	18	13	0	0	1	0
Brazil	3	0	0	3	14	214	–200	1	0	3	0	1	0
Canada	6	5	0	1	240	83	+157	37	22	3	0	2	0
England	6	6	0	0	316	55	+261	48	38	0	0	2	0
Fiji	3	1	0	2	50	119	–69	8	5	0	0	2	2
France	6	4	0	2	226	105	+121	35	21	3	0	3	0
Ireland	4	2	0	2	98	99	–1	15	10	1	0	2	0
Italy	3	1	0	2	88	56	+32	16	4	0	0	0	0
Japan	3	1	0	2	62	125	–63	10	5	0	0	1	0
New Zealand	6	5	0	1	263	104	+159	41	26	2	0	1	1
Samoa	3	0	0	3	3	225	–222	0	0	1	0	1	1
Scotland	4	2	0	2	94	103	–9	15	8	1	0	1	0
South Africa	4	2	0	2	122	133	–11	19	12	1	0	0	1
Spain	3	0	0	3	56	83	–27	9	4	1	0	1	0
United States	3	1	1	1	98	100	–2	16	9	0	0	2	0
Wales	3	0	0	3	33	108	–75	6	0	1	0	2	0

Last updated: Complete (27 September 2025)

== Try scorers ==
11 tries

- (New Zealand) Braxton Sorensen-McGee

6 tries

- (England) Jess Breach
- (Scotland) Francesca McGhie
- (Australia) Desiree Miller
- (Canada) Julia Schell
- (United States) Freda Tafuna

5 tries

- (France) Emilie Boulard
- (England) Kelsey Clifford
- (Canada) Asia Hogan-Rochester
- (England) Ellie Kildunne

4 tries

- (England) Amy Cokayne
- (Canada) Alysha Corrigan
- (Australia) Caitlyn Halse
- (South Africa) Aseza Hele
- (New Zealand) Renee Holmes
- (Canada) McKinley Hunt
- (Scotland) Rhona Lloyd
- (New Zealand) Jorja Miller
- (Italy) Vittoria Ostuni Minuzzi

3 tries

- (France) Kelly Arbey
- (England) Lark Atkin-Davies
- (Canada) Sophie de Goede
- (France) Charlotte Escudero
- (Italy) Francesca Granzotto
- (France) Joanna Grisez
- (United States) Erica Jarrell-Searcy
- (England) Megan Jones
- (England) Sadia Kabeya
- (France) Nassira Konde
- (South Africa) Ayanda Malinga
- (United States) Hope Rogers
- (United States) Nadine Roos
- (Australia) Adiana Talakai
- (England) Abbie Ward

2 tries

- (England) Sarah Bern
- (Spain) Cristina Blanco
- (France) Pauline Bourdon Sansus
- (Italy) Gaia Buso
- (Wales) Alex Callender
- (Ireland) Amee-Leigh Costigan
- (France) Annaëlle Deshayes
- (England) Abby Dow
- (Scotland) Evie Gallagher
- (Ireland) Eve Higgins
- (South Africa) Libbie Janse van Rensburg
- (Australia) Eva Karpani
- (Canada) Brittany Kassil
- (New Zealand) Ayesha Leti-I'iga
- (England) Alex Matthews
- (South Africa) Lerato Makua
- (Ireland) Anna McGann
- (France) Marine Ménager
- (New Zealand) Liana Mikaele-Tu'u
- (Ireland) Grace Moore
- (Fiji) Josifini Neihamu
- (South Africa) Aphiwe Ngwevu
- (France) Seraphine Okemba
- (New Zealand) Kaipo Olsen-Baker
- (Scotland) Emma Orr
- (Canada) Karen Paquin
- (New Zealand) Theresa Setefano
- (Canada) Emily Tuttosi
- (New Zealand) Katelyn Vaha'akolo
- (France) Gabrielle Vernier
- (New Zealand) Portia Woodman-Wickliffe

1 try

- (England) Holly Aitchison
- (Spain) Lourdes Alameda
- (Australia) Katalina Amosa
- (Spain) Inés Antolínez
- (United States) Cassidy Bargell
- (Canada) Gillian Boag
- (England) Hannah Botterman
- (Scotland) Leia Brebner-Holden
- (Ireland) Enya Breen
- (New Zealand) Sylvia Brunt
- (England) Mackenzie Carson
- (Spain) Monica Castelo
- (France) Alexandra Chambon
- (France) Léa Champon
- (Australia) Emily Chancellor
- (Italy) Giada Corradini
- (United States) Erica Coulibaly
- (Wales) Carys Cox
- (Canada) Caroline Crossley
- (New Zealand) Ruahei Demant
- (Canada) Olivia DeMerchant
- (Ireland) Linda Djougang
- (England) Maddie Feaunati
- (Italy) Valeria Fedrighi
- (Ireland) Stacey Flood
- (Canada) Fabiola Forteza
- (France) Agathe Gérin
- (Japan) Sakurako Hatada
- (Japan) Haruka Hirotsu
- (Japan) Komachi Imakugi
- (Ireland) Neve Jones
- (New Zealand) Maia Joseph
- (New Zealand) Tanya Kalounivale
- (Japan) Masami Kawamura
- (France) Assia Khalfaoui
- (Japan) Wako Kitano
- (Fiji) Manuqalo Komaitai
- (South Africa) Babalwa Latsha
- (Fiji) Kolora Lomani
- (Italy) Sara Mannini
- (Spain) Victoria Rosell Martinez
- (South Africa) Sinazo Mcatshulwa
- (England) Claudia Moloney-MacDonald
- (France) Marie Morland
- (England) Maud Muir
- (Japan) Iroha Nagata
- (Fiji) Karalaini Naisewa
- (Japan) Jennifer Nduka
- (Wales) Lisa Neumann
- (Japan) Sora Nishimura
- (Ireland) Dannah O'Brien
- (United States) Olivia Ortiz
- (England) Lucy Packer
- (England) Marlie Packer
- (Ireland) Beibhinn Parsons
- (Canada) Justine Pelletier
- (Spain) Clàudia Peña
- (Spain) Clàudia Perez
- (Canada) Taylor Perry
- (New Zealand) Georgia Ponsonby
- (New Zealand) Risi Pouri-Lane
- (Wales) Kayleigh Powell
- (France) Lina Queyroi
- (Fiji) Setaita Railumu
- (Spain) Marieta Roman
- (England) Helena Rowland
- (United States) Keia Mae Sagapolu
- (Fiji) Loraini Senivutu
- (Italy) Sara Seye
- (Italy) Francesca Sgorbini
- (Brazil) Bianca Silva
- (Australia) Cecilia Smith
- (South Africa) Sizophila Solontsi
- (Italy) Sofia Stefan
- (Canada) Florence Symonds
- (Canada) Alex Tessier
- (England) Morwenna Talling
- (Fiji) Repeka Adi Tove
- (Japan) Moe Tsukui
- (Wales) Sisilia Tuipulotu
- (Ireland) Fiona Tuite
- (New Zealand) Kennedy Tukuafu
- (France) Lina Tuy
- (Italy) Vittoria Vecchini
- (New Zealand) Chryss Viliko
- (New Zealand) Stacey Waaka

== Conversion scorers ==
21 conversions

- (England) Zoe Harrison

20 conversions

- (Canada) Sophie de Goede

19 conversions

- (New Zealand) Renee Holmes

12 conversions

- (South Africa) Byrhandré Dolf

11 conversions

- (England) Helena Rowland

10 conversions

- (Australia) Samantha Wood

9 conversions

- (France) Morgane Bourgeois
- (Ireland) Dannah O'Brien
- (France) Lina Queyroi

8 conversions

- (Scotland) Helen Nelson

7 conversions

- (New Zealand) Braxton Sorensen-McGee

5 conversions

- (England) Holly Aitchison
- (United States) Gabby Cantorna
- (Fiji) Litiana Vueti

4 conversions

- (United States) McKenzie Hawkins
- (Japan) Ayasa Ōtsuka

3 conversions

- (Spain) Amàlia Argudo
- (Australia) Lori Cramer

2 conversions

- (Canada) Alex Tessier
- (France) Lina Tuy

1 conversion

- (France) Carla Arbez
- (Italy) Alia Bitonci
- (Ireland) Enya Breen
- (Italy) Francesca Granzotto
- (Spain) Clàudia Peña
- (Italy) Beatrice Rigoni
- (Italy) Michela Sillari
- (England) Emma Sing
- (Japan) Minori Yamamoto

== Penalty goal scorers ==
3 penalties

- (France) Morgane Bourgeois
- (Brazil) Raquel Kochhann

2 penalties

- (Canada) Sophie de Goede
- (New Zealand) Renee Holmes

1 penalty

- (Spain) Amàlia Argudo
- (Wales) Keira Bevan
- (South Africa) Byrhandré Dolf
- (Scotland) Helen Nelson
- (Ireland) Dannah O'Brien
- (Canada) Alex Tessier
- (Samoa) Harmony Vatau

== Top point scorers ==
As of 27 September 2025

Pos	Name	Team	T	C	P	DG	Pts
1	Braxton Sorensen-McGee	New Zealand	11	7	0	0	69
2	Renee Holmes	New Zealand	4	19	2	0	64
3	Sophie de Goede	Canada	3	20	2	0	61
4	Zoe Harrison	England	0	21	0	0	42
5	Jess Breach	England	6	0	0	0	30
5	Francesca McGhie	Scotland	6	0	0	0	30
5	Desiree Miller	Australia	6	0	0	0	30
5	Julia Schell	Canada	6	0	0	0	30
5	Freda Tafuna	United States	6	0	0	0	30
10	Morgane Bourgeois	France	0	9	3	0	27
10	Byrhandré Dolf	South Africa	0	12	1	0	27
10	Helena Rowland	England	1	11	0	0	27

== Scoring ==
=== Overall ===
- Total number of points scored: 1,879
- Average points per match: 58.72
- Total number of tries scored: 294 (including penalty tries)
- Average tries per match: 9.19

=== Timing ===
- First try of the tournament: Sadia Kabeya for England against United States
- First brace of the tournament: Ellie Kildunne for England against United States
- First hat-trick of the tournament: Desiree Miller for Australia against Samoa
- Last try of the tournament: Alex Matthews for England against Canada
- Last brace of the tournament: Alex Matthews for England against Canada
- Last hat-trick of the tournament: Braxton Sorensen-McGee for New Zealand against Ireland
- Fastest try in a match from kickoff: 1st minute (0:55), Francesca McGhie for Scotland against Wales

=== Teams ===
- Most points scored by a team in the pool stage: 208 by England
- Fewest points scored by a team in the pool stage: 3 by Samoa
- Most points conceded by a team in the pool stage: 225 by Samoa
- Fewest points conceded by a team in the pool stage: 15 by France
- Best point difference by a team in the pool stage: +191 by England
- Worst point difference by a team in the pool stage: −222 by Samoa
- Most points scored by a team overall: 316 by England
- Fewest points scored by a team overall: 3 by Samoa

=== Individual ===
- Most points scored by an individual: 69 - Braxton Sorensen-McGee (New Zealand)
- Most tries scored by an individual: 11 - Braxton Sorensen-McGee (New Zealand)
- Most conversions scored by an individual: 21 - Zoe Harrison (England)
- Most penalty goals scored by an individual: 3 - Morgane Bourgeois (France) & Raquel Kochhann (Brazil)

== Hat-tricks ==
Unless otherwise noted, players in this list scored a hat-trick of tries.

Rank	Player	Team	Opponent	Stage	Result	Venue	Date
1	Julia Schell^{T6}	Canada	Fiji	Pool	65–7	York Community Stadium	23 August 2025
1	Braxton Sorensen-McGee	New Zealand	Japan	Pool	62–19	Sandy Park	30 August 2025
1	Braxton Sorensen-McGee	New Zealand	Ireland	Pool	40–0	Brighton & Hove Albion Stadium	7 September 2025
3	Freda Tafuna^{T4}	United States	Samoa	Pool	60–0	York Community Stadium	6 September 2025
4	Desiree Miller	Australia	Samoa	Pool	73–0	Salford Community Stadium	23 August 2025
4	Francesca McGhie	Scotland	Wales	Pool	38–8	Salford Community Stadium	23 August 2025
4	Aseza Hele	South Africa	Brazil	Pool	66–6	Franklin's Gardens	24 August 2025
4	Jess Breach	England	Samoa	Pool	92–3	Franklin's Gardens	30 August 2025
4	Vittoria Ostuni Minuzzi	Italy	Brazil	Pool	64–3	Franklin's Gardens	7 September 2025
4	Francesca Granzotto	Italy	Brazil	Pool	64–3	Franklin's Gardens	7 September 2025

Key
^{T6}	Scored 6 tries
^{T4}	Scored 4 tries

== Player of the match awards ==
Awards	Player	Team	Opponent	Ref
2	Pauline Bourdon Sansus	France	Brazil^{PM}	
2	Pauline Bourdon Sansus	France	South Africa^{PM}	
2	Sophie de Goede	Canada	Wales^{PM}	
2	Sophie de Goede	Canada	Australia^{QF}	
2	Ellie Kildunne	England	United States^{PM}	
2	Ellie Kildunne	England	France^{SF}	
2	Freda Tafuna	United States	Australia^{PM}	
2	Freda Tafuna	United States	Samoa^{PM}	
1	Sylvia Brunt	New Zealand	Ireland^{PM}	
1	Charlotte Escudero	France	Ireland^{QF}	
1	Evie Gallagher	Scotland	Fiji^{PM}	
1	Brittany Hogan	Ireland	Japan^{PM}	
1	Renee Holmes	New Zealand	France^{BF}	
1	Libbie Janse van Rensburg	South Africa	Italy^{PM}	
1	Sadia Kabeya	England	Canada^{F}	
1	Isabella Locatelli	Italy	Brazil^{PM}	
1	Alex Matthews	England	Australia^{PM}	
1	Francesca McGhie	Scotland	Wales^{PM}	
1	Liana Mikaele-Tu'u	New Zealand	Spain^{PM}	
1	Josifini Neihamu	Fiji	Wales^{PM}	
1	Aphiwe Ngwevu	South Africa	Brazil^{PM}	
1	Sora Nishimura	Japan	Spain^{PM}	
1	Kaipo Olsen-Baker	New Zealand	South Africa^{QF}	
1	Justine Pelletier	Canada	New Zealand^{SF}	
1	Ellena Perry	Ireland	Spain^{PM}	
1	Helena Rowland	England	Samoa^{PM}	
1	Julia Schell	Canada	Fiji^{PM}	
1	Cecilia Smith	Australia	Samoa^{PM}	
1	Braxton Sorensen-McGee	New Zealand	Japan^{PM}	
1	Morwenna Talling	England	Scotland^{QF}	
1	Emily Tuttosi	Canada	Scotland^{PM}	
1	Gabrielle Vernier	France	Italy^{PM}	

Key
^{PM}	Pool match
^{QF}	Quarter-final
^{SF}	Semi-final
^{BF}	Bronze final
^{F}	Final

== Discipline ==
=== Yellow cards ===
1 yellow card

- (New Zealand) Laura Bayfield (vs Japan)
- (England) Sarah Bern (vs Australia)
- (France) Rose Bernadou (vs Ireland)
- (United States) Kristin Bitter (vs Samoa)
- (England) Hannah Botterman (vs Canada)
- (France) Alexandra Chambon (vs Ireland)
- (Wales) Gwen Crabb (vs Scotland)
- (Canada) Olivia DeMerchant (vs Wales)
- (Ireland) Linda Djougang (vs Japan)
- (Wales) Georgia Evans (vs Canada)
- (France) Manaé Feleu (vs Ireland)
- (Spain) Anne Fernández de Corres (vs Japan)
- (Scotland) Evie Gallagher (vs Canada)
- (Japan) Haruka Hirotsu (vs New Zealand)
- (United States) Alev Kelter (vs England)
- (Samoa) Ana Mamea (vs Australia)
- (Fiji) Vika Matarugu (vs Scotland)
- (Australia) Faitala Moleka (vs England)
- (Ireland) Grace Moore (vs France)
- (Fiji) Adi Salote Nailolo (vs Scotland)
- (Canada) Taylor Perry (vs Fiji)
- (Brazil) Tais Prioste (vs Italy)

=== Red cards ===
1 red card

- (New Zealand) Laura Bayfield (vs Japan)
- (South Africa) Chumisa Qawe (vs France)
- (Samoa) Melina Salale (vs Australia)
- (Fiji) Bitila Tawake (vs Scotland)
- (Fiji) Bulou Vasuturaga (vs Canada)

=== Penalty tries ===
1 penalty try

- Awarded against New Zealand, vs Japan
- Awarded against Scotland, vs Canada

=== Citings/bans ===
Player	Opposition	Match date	Law breached	Result	Note	Ref
(Fiji) Bulou Vasuturaga	Canada	23 August 2025	9.13 – Dangerous tackle (red card)	3-match ban (Note: The ban is reduced by one match, subject to the player's completion of the World Rugby Coaching Intervention Programme.)	–	
(Samoa) Melina Salale	Australia	23 August 2025	9.13 – Dangerous tackle (red card)	3-match ban	–	
(Fiji) Bitila Tawake	Scotland	30 August 2025	9.13 – Dangerous tackle (red card)	4-match ban	–	
(New Zealand) Laura Bayfield	Japan	30 August 2025	2 yellow cards (red card)	Sending off sufficient	–	
(South Africa) Chumisa Qawe	France	7 September 2025	9.13 – Dangerous tackle (red card)	3-match ban	–	
(France) Axelle Berthoumieu	Ireland	14 September 2025	9.12 – Physical abuse, biting (citing)	9-match ban	–	
(France) Manae Feleu	Ireland	14 September 2025	9.13 – Dangerous tackle (citing)	3-match ban	–	

== See also ==
- 2021 Rugby World Cup statistics

== Sources ==
- Statistics Women's Rugby World Cup 2025
