= 2025 Women's Rugby World Cup Pool B =

Pool B of the 2025 Women's Rugby World Cup began in August 2025. The pool includes Canada, Fiji, Scotland and Wales.

== Teams ==
The draw for the pool stage took place on 17 October 2024 in London. A seeding system was used for the draw, with teams allocated a seed based on their World Rugby Women's World Rankings as of 14 October 2024. The top four teams in the rankings were placed into band 1 and prepopulated into the first position in each pool. The remaining 12 teams were drawn into bands 2, 3, and 4 based on their rankings and drawn one by one.

Pos.	Team	Band	Confederation	Method of qualification	Date of qualification	Apps.	Last	Previous best performance	World Rugby Rankings	
Pos.	Team	Band	Confederation	Method of qualification	Date of qualification	Apps.	Last	Previous best performance	14 October 2024 (Note: The rankings of 14 October 2024 were used for seeding for the draw.)	18 August 2025 (Note: The final rankings before the tournament started)
B1	Canada	1	North America	Top 4 at 2021 RWC	30 October 2022	10th	2021	Runners-up (2014)	2	2
B2	Scotland	2	Europe	2024 WXV 2	30 October 2024	7th	2021	5th (1994)	7	8
B3	Wales	3	Europe	2024 WXV 2	11 October 2024	9th	2021	Fourth place (1994)	10	9
B4	Fiji	4	Oceania	Oceania 1	2 June 2024	2nd	2021	Pool stage (2021)	17	14

== Standings ==
Pos	Team	Pld	W	D	L	PF	PA	PD	TF	TA	TB	LB	Pts	
1	Canada	3	3	0	0	147	26	+121	23	4	3	0	15	Advance to knockout stage
2	Scotland	3	2	0	1	86	63	+23	14	10	2	0	10	Advance to knockout stage
3	Fiji	3	1	0	2	50	119	−69	8	21	1	0	5	
4	Wales	3	0	0	3	33	108	−75	6	16	1	1	2	

Source: World Rugby

== Matches ==
The match schedule was confirmed by World Rugby on 22 October 2024. The first match of pool B is Scotland vs Wales.

=== Scotland vs Wales ===
23 August 2025
14:45 BST (UTC+1)

(1 BP) Scotland	38–8	Wales
Try: McGhie (3) 1' m, 18' m, 43' c Brebner-Holden 31' c Gallagher 63' c Orr 78' c Con: Nelson (4/6) 32', 44', 64', 79'	Report	Try: Callender 13' m Pen: Bevan (1/1) 22'

Salford Community Stadium, Manchester
Attendance: 10,054 (Note: This fixture was sold under a single ticket with the Australia vs Samoa Pool A match. The recorded attendance corresponds to the Scotland vs Wales game.)
Referee: Maggie Cogger-Orr (New Zealand)

FB	15	Chloe Rollie
RW	14	Rhona Lloyd
OC	13	Emma Orr
IC	12	Lisa Thomson	(substituted off) 63'
LW	11	Francesca McGhie
FH	10	Helen Nelson
SH	9	Leia Brebner-Holden	(substituted off) 53'
N8	8	Evie Gallagher
OF	7	Rachel McLachlan	(substituted off) 60'
BF	6	Rachel Malcolm (c)
RL	5	Sarah Bonar	(substituted off) 60'
LL	4	Emma Wassell	(substituted off) 70'
TP	3	Elliann Clarke	(substituted off) 38'	(substituted in) 41'	(substituted off) 71'
HK	2	Lana Skeldon	(substituted off) 47'
LP	1	Leah Bartlett	(substituted off) 63'
Replacements:
HK	16	Elis Martin	(substituted in) 47'
PR	17	Molly Wright	(substituted in) 63'
PR	18	Lisa Cockburn	(substituted in) 38'	(substituted off) 41'	(substituted in) 71'
SR	19	Jade Konkel-Roberts	(substituted in) 60'
SR	20	Eva Donaldson	(substituted in) 70'
BR	21	Alex Stewart	(substituted in) 60'
SH	22	Caity Mattinson	(substituted in) 53'
CE	23	Beth Blacklock	(substituted in) 63'
Coach:
Bryan Easson

FB	15	Nel Metcalfe
RW	14	Jasmine Joyce-Butchers
OC	13	Hannah Dallavalle				(substituted off) 47'
IC	12	Courtney Keight		(substituted off) 19'	(substituted in) 30'
LW	11	Lisa Neumann
FH	10	Lleucu George		(substituted off) 63'
SH	9	Keira Bevan		(substituted off) 61'
N8	8	Alex Callender (cc)
OF	7	Bethan Lewis
BF	6	Kate Williams (cc)
RL	5	Gwen Crabb	(yellow card) 52'	(substituted off) 65'
LL	4	Alaw Pyrs		(substituted off) 47'
TP	3	Donna Rose		(substituted off) 51'
HK	2	Kelsey Jones		(substituted off) 51'
LP	1	Gwenllian Pyrs		(substituted off) 51'
Replacements:
HK	16	Carys Phillips		(substituted in) 51'
PR	17	Maisie Davies		(substituted in) 51'
PR	18	Sisilia Tuipulotu		(substituted in) 51'
SR	19	Abbie Fleming		(substituted in) 47'
BR	20	Georgia Evans		(substituted in) 65'
SH	21	Seren Lockwood		(substituted in) 61'
FH	22	Kayleigh Powell		(substituted in) 63'
CE	23	Carys Cox		(substituted in) 19'	(substituted off) 30'	(substituted in) 47'
Coach:
Sean Lynn

Player of the Match:
Francesca McGhie (Scotland)

Assistant referees:
Holly Wood (England)
Jess Ling (Australia)
Television match official:
Ian Tempest (England)
Foul play review officer:
Rachel Horton (Australia)

Notes:

- This was Scotland's largest ever win over Wales, and their largest margin of victory in a World Cup match since beating Russia by 66–0 in 1994.
- Lisa Neumann (Wales) earned her 50th test cap.

=== Canada vs Fiji ===
23 August 2025
17:30 BST (UTC+1)

(1 BP) Canada	65–7	Fiji
Try: De Goede 6' c Boag 14' m Crossley 22' c Corrigan 29' m Schell (6) 50' c, 52' m, 54' c, 61' m, 69' m, 72' m Paquin 77' c Con: De Goede (4/8) 7', 23', 51', 55'; Tessier (1/1) 78'	Report	Try: Lomani 43' c Con: Vueti (1/1) 44'

York Community Stadium, York
Attendance: 4,810
Referee: Aurélie Groizeleau (France)

FB	15	Julia Schell
RW	14	Alysha Corrigan
OC	13	Florence Symonds		(substituted off) 66'
IC	12	Alex Tessier (c)
LW	11	Fancy Bermudez		(substituted off) 45'
FH	10	Taylor Perry	(yellow card) 18'
SH	9	Justine Pelletier
N8	8	Gabby Senft		(substituted off) 56'
OF	7	Fabiola Forteza
BF	6	Caroline Crossley
RL	5	Courtney O'Donnell		(substituted off) 52'
LL	4	Sophie de Goede		(substituted off) 62'
TP	3	DaLeaka Menin		(substituted off) 60'
HK	2	Gillian Boag		(substituted off) 46'
LP	1	Brittany Kassil		(substituted off) 46'	(substituted in) 70'	(substituted off) 80'
Replacements:
HK	16	Emily Tuttosi		(substituted in) 46'
PR	17	McKinley Hunt		(substituted in) 46'	(substituted off) 70'	(substituted in) 80'
PR	18	Maya Montiel		(substituted in) 60'
SR	19	Tyson Beukeboom		(substituted in) 52'
SR	20	Karen Paquin		(substituted in) 62'
BR	21	Rachel Smith		(substituted in) 56'
SH	22	Olivia Apps		(substituted in) 45'
CE	23	Shoshanah Seumanutafa		(substituted in) 66'
Coach:
Kévin Rouet

FB	15	Litiana Vueti		(substituted off) 56'
RW	14	Ilisapeci Delaiwau		(substituted off) 40'
OC	13	Ema Adivitaloga
IC	12	Josifini Neihamu
LW	11	Repeka Adi Tove
FH	10	Salanieta Kinita		(substituted off) 73'
SH	9	Setaita Railumu
N8	8	Manuqalo Komaitai		(substituted off) 46'
OF	7	Alfreda Fisher Maria (c)
BF	6	Nunia Delaimoala
RL	5	Mereoni Nakesa		(substituted off) 52'
LL	4	Jade Coates
TP	3	Tiana Robanakadavu		(substituted off) 46'
HK	2	Bitila Tawake		(substituted off) 71'
LP	1	Loraini Senivutu		(substituted off) 51'
Replacements:
HK	16	Selai Naliva		(substituted in) 71'
PR	17	Bulou Vasuturaga	(red card) 68'	(substituted in) 51'
PR	18	Vika Matarugu		(substituted in) 46'
SR	19	Asinate Serevi		(substituted in) 52'
BR	20	Karalaini Naisewa		(substituted in) 46'
SH	21	Kolora Lomani		(substituted in) 40'
FH	22	Kelerayani Luvu		(substituted in) 73'
WG	23	Salote Nailolo		(substituted in) 56'
Coach:
Ioan Cunningham

Player of the Match:
Julia Schell (Canada)

Assistant referees:
Kat Roche (United States)
Amber Stamp-Dunstan (Wales)
Television match official:
Quinton Immelman (South Africa)
Foul play review officer:
Andrew McMenemy (Scotland)

Notes:

- Olivia DeMerchant was originally named to start for Canada but withdrew through injury; DaLeaka Menin came into the XV, with Maya Montiel added to the bench.

=== Canada vs Wales ===
30 August 2025
12:00 BST (UTC+1)

(1 BP) Canada	42–0	Wales
Try: Hunt (2) 16' c, 29' c Corrigan 26' c Hogan-Rochester 31' c Perry 50' c Kassil 55' c Con: De Goede (6/6) 17', 27', 30', 32', 51', 56'	Report

Salford Community Stadium, Manchester
Attendance: 9,803 (Note: This fixture was sold under a single ticket with the Scotland vs Fiji match in the same pool. The recorded attendance corresponds to the Scotland vs Fiji game.)
Referee: Hollie Davidson (Scotland)

FB	15	Julia Schell
RW	14	Alysha Corrigan
OC	13	Florence Symonds		(substituted off) 73'
IC	12	Alex Tessier (c)		(substituted off) 60'
LW	11	Asia Hogan-Rochester		(substituted off) 69'
FH	10	Taylor Perry
SH	9	Justine Pelletier		(substituted off) 53'
N8	8	Gabby Senft		(substituted off) 48'
OF	7	Karen Paquin
BF	6	Caroline Crossley		(substituted off) 68'
RL	5	Tyson Beukeboom
LL	4	Sophie de Goede
TP	3	DaLeaka Menin		(substituted off) 57'
HK	2	Emily Tuttosi		(substituted off) 60'
LP	1	McKinley Hunt		(substituted off) 48'
Replacements:
HK	16	Gillian Boag		(substituted in) 60'
PR	17	Brittany Kassil		(substituted in) 48'
PR	18	Olivia DeMerchant	(yellow card) 60'	(substituted in) 57'
SR	19	Courtney O'Donnell		(substituted in) 68'
BR	20	Fabiola Forteza		(substituted in) 48'
SH	21	Olivia Apps		(substituted in) 53'
FH	22	Claire Gallagher		(substituted in) 60'
CE	23	Shoshanah Seumanutafa		(substituted in) 73'
Coach:
Kévin Rouet

FB	15	Nel Metcalfe
RW	14	Jasmine Joyce-Butchers		(substituted off) 53'
OC	13	Carys Cox
IC	12	Courtney Keight		(substituted off) 53'
LW	11	Lisa Neumann
FH	10	Lleucu George
SH	9	Keira Bevan		(substituted off) 71'
N8	8	Georgia Evans	(yellow card) 46'
OF	7	Bethan Lewis (c)
BF	6	Bryonie King
RL	5	Gwen Crabb		(substituted off) 58'
LL	4	Abbie Fleming		(substituted off) 73'
TP	3	Sisilia Tuipulotu		(substituted off) 60'	(substituted in) 75'
HK	2	Molly Reardon		(substituted off) 48'
LP	1	Maisie Davies		(substituted off) 48'
Replacements:
HK	16	Kelsey Jones		(substituted in) 48'
PR	17	Gwenllian Pyrs		(substituted in) 48'
PR	18	Jenni Scoble		(substituted in) 60'	(substituted off) 75'
SR	19	Tilly Vucaj		(substituted in) 73'
BR	20	Branwen Metcalfe		(substituted in) 58'
SH	21	Seren Lockwood		(substituted in) 71'
FH	22	Kayleigh Powell		(substituted in) 53'
CE	23	Kerin Lake		(substituted in) 53'
Coach:
Sean Lynn

Player of the Match:
Sophie de Goede (Canada)

Assistant referees:
Aimee Barrett-Theron (South Africa)
Jess Ling (Australia)
Television match official:
Leo Colgan (Ireland)
Foul play review officer:
Quinton Immelman (South Africa)

Notes:

- Sophie de Goede became Canada's all-time top test points scorer (262), surpassing the previous record held by Magali Harvey.
- Gwenllian Pyrs (Wales) earned her 50th test cap.
- Branwen Metcalfe (Wales) made her international debut.

=== Scotland vs Fiji ===
30 August 2025
14:45 BST (UTC+1)

(1 BP) Scotland	29–15	Fiji
Try: McGhie (2) 2' m, 56' m Lloyd (2) 10' m, 34' c Orr 60' c Con: Nelson (2/5) 34', 61'	Report	Try: Senivutu 25' m Komaitai 51' m Naisewa 75' m

Salford Community Stadium, Manchester
Attendance: 9,803 (Note: This fixture was sold under a single ticket with the Canada vs Wales match in the same pool. The recorded attendance corresponds to the Scotland vs Fiji game.)
Referee: Lauren Jenner (Italy)

FB	15	Chloe Rollie
RW	14	Rhona Lloyd
OC	13	Emma Orr
IC	12	Lisa Thomson	(substituted off) 66'
LW	11	Francesca McGhie
FH	10	Helen Nelson
SH	9	Leia Brebner-Holden	(substituted off) 78'
N8	8	Evie Gallagher
OF	7	Rachel McLachlan	(substituted off) 52'
BF	6	Rachel Malcolm (c)
RL	5	Sarah Bonar	(substituted off) 76'
LL	4	Emma Wassell	(substituted off) 67'
TP	3	Elliann Clarke	(substituted off) 42'
HK	2	Elis Martin	(substituted off) 66'
LP	1	Leah Bartlett	(substituted off) 52'
Replacements:
HK	16	Molly Wright	(substituted in) 66'
PR	17	Anne Young	(substituted in) 52'
PR	18	Lisa Cockburn	(substituted in) 42'
SR	19	Adelle Ferrie	(substituted in) 76'
SR	20	Eva Donaldson	(substituted in) 67'
BR	21	Alex Stewart	(substituted in) 52'
SH	22	Caity Mattinson	(substituted in) 78'
CE	23	Beth Blacklock	(substituted in) 66'
Coach:
Bryan Easson

FB	15	Litiana Vueti		(substituted off) 36'
RW	14	Alowesi Nakoci
OC	13	Verenaisi Ditavutu
IC	12	Josifini Neihamu
LW	11	Michella'e Stolz		(substituted off) 3'
FH	10	Salanieta Kinita
SH	9	Setaita Railumu
N8	8	Manuqalo Komaitai		(substituted off) 67'	(substituted in) 78'
OF	7	Alfreda Fisher Maria (c)		(substituted off) 9'	(substituted in) 20'	(substituted off) 41'
BF	6	Nunia Delaimoala
RL	5	Mereoni Nakesa		(substituted off) 61'
LL	4	Jade Coates
TP	3	Vika Matarugu	(yellow card) 8'			(substituted off) 48'
HK	2	Bitila Tawake	(red card) 56'		(substituted off) 78'
LP	1	Loraini Senivutu		(substituted off) 68'
Replacements:
HK	16	Keleni Marawa
BR	17	Karalaini Naisewa				(substituted in) 41'
PR	18	Tiana Robanakadavu		(substituted in) 9'	(substituted off) 20'	(substituted in) 48'
BR	19	Carletta Yee		(substituted in) 61'
PR	20	Sulita Waisega		(substituted in) 68'
SH	21	Kolora Lomani		(substituted in) 3'
FH	22	Kelerayani Luvu
WG	23	Salote Nailolo	(yellow card) 79'	(substituted in) 36'
Coach:
Ioan Cunningham

Player of the Match:
Evie Gallagher (Scotland)

Assistant referees:
Holly Wood (England)
Amelia Luciano (United States)
Television match official:
Rachel Horton (Australia)
Foul play review officer:
Ian Tempest (England)

=== Canada vs Scotland ===
6 September 2025
12:00 BST (UTC+1)

(1 BP) Canada	40–19	Scotland
Try: Hunt 11' c Penalty try 32'; Tuttosi (2) 34' m, 57' c Kassil 64' c DeMerchant 78' c Con: De Goede (3/4) 12', 58', 65'; Tessier (1/1) 79'	Report	Try: Lloyd 22' m Gallagher 51' c McGhie 75' c Con: Nelson (2/3) 52', 76'

Sandy Park, Exeter
Attendance: 14,003 (Note: This fixture was sold under a single ticket with the Wales vs Fiji Pool B match. The recorded attendance corresponds to the Wales vs Fiji game.)
Referee: Aimee Barrett-Theron (South Africa)

FB	15	Julia Schell
RW	14	Paige Farries
OC	13	Florence Symonds	(substituted off) 65'
IC	12	Alex Tessier (c)
LW	11	Asia Hogan-Rochester
FH	10	Taylor Perry
SH	9	Justine Pelletier	(substituted off) 55'
N8	8	Gabby Senft			(substituted off) 46'
OF	7	Karen Paquin
BF	6	Fabiola Forteza
RL	5	Tyson Beukeboom	(substituted off) 62'
LL	4	Sophie de Goede	(substituted off) 40+1'	(substituted in) 42'	(substituted off) 72'
TP	3	DaLeaka Menin	(substituted off) 69'
HK	2	Emily Tuttosi	(substituted off) 62'
LP	1	McKinley Hunt	(substituted off) 46'
Replacements:
HK	16	Gillian Boag	(substituted in) 62'
PR	17	Brittany Kassil	(substituted in) 46'
PR	18	Olivia DeMerchant	(substituted in) 69'
SR	19	Laetitia Royer	(substituted in) 62'
SR	20	Courtney O'Donnell	(substituted in) 40+1'	(substituted off) 42'	(substituted in) 46'
BR	21	Caroline Crossley			(substituted in) 72'
SH	22	Olivia Apps	(substituted in) 55'
CE	23	Shoshanah Seumanutafa	(substituted in) 65'
Coach:
Kévin Rouet

FB	15	Chloe Rollie
RW	14	Rhona Lloyd
OC	13	Emma Orr
IC	12	Lisa Thomson				(substituted off) 72'
LW	11	Francesca McGhie
FH	10	Helen Nelson		(substituted off) 19'	(substituted in) 27'
SH	9	Leia Brebner-Holden		(substituted off) 58'
N8	8	Evie Gallagher	(yellow card) 31'
OF	7	Rachel McLachlan		(substituted off) 58'
BF	6	Rachel Malcolm (c)
RL	5	Sarah Bonar		(substituted off) 58'
LL	4	Emma Wassell		(substituted off) 67'
TP	3	Lisa Cockburn		(substituted off) 24'
HK	2	Lana Skeldon		(substituted off) 53'
LP	1	Leah Bartlett		(substituted off) 64'
Replacements:
HK	16	Elis Martin		(substituted in) 53'
PR	17	Anne Young		(substituted in) 64'
PR	18	Molly Poolman		(substituted in) 24'
SR	19	Jade Konkel-Roberts		(substituted in) 58'
SR	20	Eva Donaldson		(substituted in) 67'
BR	21	Alex Stewart		(substituted in) 58'
SH	22	Caity Mattinson		(substituted in) 58'
CE	23	Evie Wills		(substituted in) 19'	(substituted off) 27'	(substituted in) 72'
Coach:
Bryan Easson

Player of the Match:
Emily Tuttosi (Canada)

Assistant referees:
Ella Goldsmith (Australia)
Maria Heitor (Portugal)
Television match official:
Rachel Horton (Australia)
Foul play review officer:
Leo Colgan (Ireland)

Notes:

- Tyson Beukeboom earned her 81st cap to became Canada's most capped player – male or female – in test history, surpassing the previous record of 80 held by Aaron Carpenter.
- Brittany Kassil, Courtney O'Donnell (both Canada) and Sarah Bonar (Scotland) earned their 50th test caps.

=== Wales vs Fiji ===
6 September 2025
14:45 BST (UTC+1)

(2 BP) Wales	25–28	Fiji (1 BP)
Try: Cox 2' m Callender 12' m Tuipulotu 40+1' m Powell 45' m Neumann 72' m	Report	Try: Neihamu (2) 8' c, 19' c Railumu 28' c Tove 37' c Con: Vueti (4/4) 9', 20', 29', 38'

Sandy Park, Exeter
Attendance: 14,003 (Note: This fixture was sold under a single ticket with the Canada vs Scotland Pool B match. The recorded attendance corresponds to the Wales vs Fiji game.)
Referee: Kat Roche (United States)

FB	15	Kayleigh Powell
RW	14	Lisa Neumann
OC	13	Carys Cox
IC	12	Courtney Keight	(substituted off) 42'
LW	11	Nel Metcalfe	(substituted off) 78'
FH	10	Lleucu George
SH	9	Keira Bevan	(substituted off) 63'
N8	8	Alex Callender (cc)
OF	7	Bethan Lewis
BF	6	Kate Williams (cc)	(substituted off) 63'
RL	5	Gwen Crabb		(substituted off) 68'
LL	4	Georgia Evans	(substituted off) 57'	(substituted in) 68'
TP	3	Sisilia Tuipulotu	(substituted off) 63'
HK	2	Carys Phillips	(substituted off) 68'
LP	1	Maisie Davies	(substituted off) 52'
Replacements:
HK	16	Molly Reardon	(substituted in) 68'
PR	17	Gwenllian Pyrs	(substituted in) 52'
PR	18	Donna Rose	(substituted in) 63'
SR	19	Abbie Fleming	(substituted in) 57'
BR	20	Bryonie King	(substituted in) 63'
SH	21	Seren Lockwood	(substituted in) 63'
CE	22	Hannah Dallavalle	(substituted in) 42'
WG	23	Jasmine Joyce-Butchers	(substituted in) 78'
Coach:
Sean Lynn

FB	15	Litiana Vueti	(substituted off) 55'
RW	14	Repeka Tove
OC	13	Verenaisi Ditavutu
IC	12	Josifini Neihamu
LW	11	Kolora Lomani
FH	10	Salanieta Kinita
SH	9	Setaita Railumu
N8	8	Manuqalo Komaitai	(substituted off) 63'
OF	7	Alfreda Fisher Maria (c)
BF	6	Nunia Delaimoala
RL	5	Asinate Serevi	(substituted off) 47'
LL	4	Jade Coates	(substituted off) 73'
TP	3	Vika Matarugu	(substituted off) 52'
HK	2	Keleni Marawa
LP	1	Karalaini Naisewa
Replacements:
HK	16	Selai Naliva
BR	17	Carletta Yee	(substituted in) 73'
PR	18	Tiana Robanakadavu	(substituted in) 52'
BR	19	Mereoni Nakesa	(substituted in) 47'
PR	20	Sulita Waisega	(substituted in) 63'
SH	21	Repeka Mata
FH	22	Kelerayani Luvu
WG	23	Salote Nailolo	(substituted in) 55'
Coach:
Ioan Cunningham

Player of the Match:
Josifini Neihamu (Fiji)

Assistant referees:
Lauren Jenner (Italy)
Jess Ling (Australia)
Television match official:
Andrew McMenemy (Scotland)
Foul play review officer:
Leo Colgan (Ireland)

Notes:

- With this defeat, Wales dropped to 12th place in the World Rugby Rankings – their lowest position since the rankings were established in 2003.
