= Ruby Anderson =

Ruby Anderson may refer to:

- Ruby Anderson (General Hospital), a character on the American soap opera General Hospital
- Ruby Anderson (rugby union), Australian rugby union player
- Ruby Langford Ginibi, née Anderson, Bundjalung author, historian and lecturer
