= 2025 Pacific Four Series =

Tournament details
- Hosts: Australia; New Zealand; United States
- Date: 3–24 May 2025
- Countries: Australia; Canada; New Zealand; United States

Final positions
- Champions: New Zealand (3rd title)
- Runner-up: Canada

Tournament statistics
- Matches played: 6
- Tries scored: 53 (8.83 per match)
- Top scorer(s): (New Zealand) Portia Woodman-Wickliffe (35)
- Most tries: (New Zealand) Portia Woodman-Wickliffe (7)

The 2025 Pacific Four Series was the fifth edition of the Pacific Four Series, an international women's rugby union tournament. Matches took place from the 3 to 24 May over two continents and provided all four teams with important preparation ahead of the Women's Rugby World Cup in England. Canada were the reigning champions and were defending their title in this tournament.

New Zealand reclaimed the Pacific Four Series after winning against the United States in the final match. They beat Canada to the title on points difference.

== Participants ==
Team	Stadia			Head coach	Captain	World Rugby Ranking	
Team	Home stadium	Capacity	Location	Head coach	Captain	Start (Note: As at 28 April 2025.)	End (Note: As at 26 May 2025.)
Australia	Newcastle International Sports Centre	30,000	Newcastle	Joanne Yapp	Siokapesi Palu	6th	6th
Australia	Canberra Stadium	25,011	Canberra	Joanne Yapp	Siokapesi Palu	6th	6th
Australia	Lang Park	52,500	Brisbane	Joanne Yapp	Siokapesi Palu	6th	6th
Canada	—N/a			Kévin Rouet	Alex Tessier	2nd	2nd
New Zealand	Rugby League Park	17,104	Christchurch	Allan Bunting	Kennedy Tukuafu; Ruahei Demant	3rd	3rd
New Zealand	North Harbour Stadium	14,000	Albany	Allan Bunting	Kennedy Tukuafu; Ruahei Demant	3rd	3rd
United States	CPKC Stadium	11,500	Kansas City	Sione Fukofuka	Kate Zackary	9th	9th

== Table ==
Correct as of 24 May 2025

Pos	Team	Pld	W	D	L	PF	PA	PD	TF	TA	TB	LB	Pts	NZL	CAN	AUS	USA
1	New Zealand	3	2	1	0	144	53	+91	23	9	3	0	13	—	27–27		79–14
2	Canada	3	2	1	0	98	48	+50	16	7	3	0	13		—		
3	Australia	3	1	0	2	46	102	−56	7	16	1	0	5	12–38	7–45	—	27–19
4	United States	3	0	0	3	47	132	−85	7	21	0	0	0		14–26		—

Source: World Rugby

== Fixtures ==
=== Round 1 ===
2 May 2025
19:30 CDT (UTC-5)

United States	14–26	Canada
Try: Zackary 37' c Kelter 66' c Con: Hawkins (2/2) 38', 66'	Report	Try: Pelletier 10' c Royer 35' c Holtkamp 71' c Lachance 77' m Con: Julia Schell (3/4) 11', 35', 72'

CPKC Stadium, Kansas City
Attendance: 10,518
Referee: Lauren Jenner (Italy)

Team details

LP	1	Hope Rogers
HK	2	Kathryn Treder
TP	3	Keia Mae Sagapiolu
LL	4	Hallie Taufo'ou
RL	5	Erica Jarrell
BF	6	Tahlia Brody
OF	7	Kate Zackary (c)
N8	8	Rachel Johnson
SH	9	Olivia Ortiz
FH	10	McKenzie Hawkins
LW	11	Erica Coulibaly
IC	12	Alev Kelter
OC	13	Ilona Maher
RW	14	Emily Henrich
FB	15	Bulou Mataitoga
Replacements:
HK	16	Paige Stathopoulos
PR	17	Maya Learned
PR	18	Charli Jacoby (yellow card) 68'
LK	19	Rachel Ehrecke
BR	20	Freda Tafuna
SH	21	Taina Tukuafu
BK	22	Gabby Cantorna
BK	23	Nicole Heavirland
Coach:
Sione Fukofuka

LP	1	Brittany Kassil
HK	2	Gillian Boag
TP	3	Rori Wood
LL	4	Rachel Smith
RL	5	Laetitia Royer
BF	6	Fabiola Forteza
OF	7	Karen Paquin
N8	8	Gabrielle Senft
SH	9	Justine Pelletier
FH	10	Alexandra Tessier (c)
LW	11	Krissy Scurfield
IC	12	Taylor Perry
OC	13	Shoshanah Seumanutafa
RW	14	Fancy Bermudez
FB	15	Julia Schell
Replacements:
HK	16	Emily Tuttosi
PR	17	Mikiela Nelson
PR	18	DaLeaka Menin
FW	19	Courtney O'Donnell (yellow card) 51'
FW	20	Tyson Beukeboom
FW	21	Julia Omokhuale
BK	22	Sarah-Maude Lachance
BK	23	Claire Gallagher
Coach:
Kévin Rouet

10 May 2025
15:00 AEST (UTC+10)

Australia	12–38	New Zealand
Try: Karpani 45' m Marsters 56' c Con: Faitala Moleka (1/2) 57'	Report	Try: Leti-I'iga (2) 11' c, 25' c Sorensen-McGee (2) 38' m, 78' c Viliko 41' c Brunt 66' m Con: Demant (3/4) 12', 26', 42'; King (1/2) 79'

Newcastle International Sports Centre, Newcastle
Referee: Clara Munarini (Italy)

Team details

LP	1	Martha Fua
HK	2	Katalina Amosa
TP	3	Eva Karpani
LL	4	Kaitlan Leaney
RL	5	Michaela Leonard
BF	6	Siokapesi Palu (c)
OF	7	Emily Chancellor
N8	8	Tabua Tuinakauvadra
SH	9	Layne Morgan
FH	10	Tia Hinds
LW	11	Desiree Miller
IC	12	Cecilia Smith
OC	13	Georgina Friedrichs
RW	14	Charlotte Caslick
FB	15	Faitala Moleka
Replacements:
HK	16	Tania Naden
PR	17	Lydia Kavoa
PR	18	Bridie O’Gorman
LK	19	Tiarah Minns
FW	20	Ashley Marsters
SH	21	Natalie Wright
BK	22	Trilleen Pomare
BK	23	Lori Cramer
Coach:
Joanne Yapp

LP	1	Chryss Viliko
HK	2	Georgia Ponsonby
TP	3	Tanya Kalounivale
LL	4	Alana Bremner
RL	5	Maiakawanakaulani Roos
BF	6	Layla Sae
OF	7	Kennedy Tukuafu (cc)
N8	8	Kaipo Olsen-Baker
SH	9	Maia Joseph
FH	10	Ruahei Demant (cc)
LW	11	Katelyn Vaha'akolo
IC	12	Sylvia Brunt
OC	13	Amy du Plessis
RW	14	Ayesha Leti-I’iga
FB	15	Braxton Sorensen-McGee
Replacements:
HK	16	Atlanta Lolohea
PR	17	Awhina Tangen-Wainohu
PR	18	Amy Rule
FW	19	Maama Mo’onia Vaipulu
FW	20	Dhys Faleafaga
FW	21	Iritana Hohaia
BK	22	Hannah King
BK	23	Mererangi Paul
Coach:
Allan Bunting

- Braxton Sorensen-McGee made her test debut for the Black Ferns.

=== Round 2 ===
17 May 2025
15:35 NZST (UTC+12)

New Zealand	27–27	Canada
Try: Sorensen-McGee 5' c Leti-I'iga 32' m, 54' c Brunt 83' m Con: Demant (2/4) 5', 54'; Pen: Demant (1/1) 68'	Report	Try: Menin 12' c Hogan-Rochester 39' m Apps 61' m Corrigan 64' m Seumanutafa 76' m Con: Schell (1/5) 12'

Rugby League Park, Christchurch
Referee: Kat Roche (United States)

Team details

LP	1	Chryss Viliko (substituted off) 68'
HK	2	Georgia Ponsonby (substituted off) 69'
TP	3	Amy Rule (substituted off) 47'
LL	4	Alana Bremner
RL	5	Maiakawanakaulani Roos (substituted off) 71'
BF	6	Layla Sae (substituted off) 47'
OF	7	Kennedy Tukuafu (cc)
N8	8	Liana Mikaele-Tu'u
SH	9	Maia Joseph (substituted off) 69'
FH	10	Ruahei Demant (cc)
LW	11	Ayesha Leti-I’iga (substituted off) 76'
IC	12	Sylvia Brunt
OC	13	Amy du Plessis (substituted off) 76'
RW	14	Portia Woodman-Wickliffe
FB	15	Braxton Sorensen-McGee
Replacements:
HK	16	Atlanta Lolohea (substituted on) 69'
PR	17	Kate Henwood (substituted on) 68'
PR	18	Tanya Kalounivale (substituted on) 47'
FW	19	Maama Mo’onia Vaipulu (substituted on) 71'
FW	20	Kaipo Olsen-Baker (substituted on) 47'
FW	21	Iritana Hohaia (substituted on) 69'
BK	22	Hannah King (substituted on) 76'
BK	23	Mererangi Paul (substituted on) 76'
Coach:
Allan Bunting

LP	1	Brittany Kassil (substituted off) 50'
HK	2	Emily Tuttosi (substituted off) 62'
TP	3	Daleaka Menin
LL	4	Courtney O'Donnell
RL	5	Laetitia Royer (substituted off) 55'
BF	6	Fabiola Forteza
OF	7	Karen Paquin
N8	8	Gabrielle Senft (substituted off) 66'
SH	9	Justine Pelletier (substituted off) 56'
FH	10	Claire Gallagher
LW	11	Alysha Corrigan
IC	12	Alexandra Tessier (substituted off) 58'
OC	13	Florence Symonds
RW	14	Asia Hogan-Rochester (substituted off) 41'
FB	15	Julia Schell
Replacements:
HK	16	Gillian Boag (substituted on) 62'
PR	17	McKinley Hunt (substituted on) 50'
PR	18	Rori Wood
FW	19	Tyson Beukeboom (substituted on) 55'
FW	20	Caroline Crossley (substituted on) 66'
FW	21	Olivia Apps (substituted on) 56'
BK	22	Shoshanah Seumanutafa
BK	23	Fancy Bermudez (substituted on) 41'
Coach:
Kévin Rouet

17 May 2025
16:55 AEST (UTC+10)

Australia	27–19	United States
Try: Caslick 17' c Marsters 27' m, 46' m Karpani 34' m Con: Moleka (2/4) 17', 34'; Pen: Moleka (1/1) 61'	Report	Try: Rogers (3) 14' c, 37' c, 44' m Con: Hawkins (2/3) 14', 37'

Canberra Stadium, Canberra
Referee: Aimee Barrett-Theron (South Africa)

Team details

LP	1	Bree-Anna Browne
HK	2	Tania Naden
TP	3	Eva Karpani
LL	4	Kaitlan Leaney
RL	5	Michaela Leonard
BF	6	Siokapesi Palu (c)
OF	7	Ashley Marsters
N8	8	Tabua Tuinakauvadra
SH	9	Layne Morgan
FH	10	Faitala Moleka
LW	11	Desiree Miller
IC	12	Cecilia Smith
OC	13	Georgina Friedrichs
RW	14	Charlotte Caslick
FB	15	Caitlyn Halse
Replacements:
HK	16	Katalina Amosa
PR	17	Faliki Pohiva
PR	18	Bridie O’Gorman
LK	19	Emily Chancellor
FW	20	Ruby Anderson
SH	21	Natalie Wright
BK	22	Trilleen Pomare
BK	23	Lori Cramer
Coach:
Joanne Yapp

LP	1	Hope Rogers
HK	2	Kathryn Treder
TP	3	Keia Mae Sagapiolu
LL	4	Hallie Taufo'ou
RL	5	Erica Jarrell
BF	6	Tahlia Brody
OF	7	Kate Zackary (c)
N8	8	Rachel Johnson
SH	9	Olivia Ortiz
FH	10	McKenzie Hawkins
LW	11	Bulou Mataitoga
IC	12	Alev Kelter	(red card) 79'
OC	13	Ilona Maher
RW	14	Emily Henrich
FB	15	Tess Feury
Replacements:
HK	16	Paige Stathopoulos
PR	17	Maya Learned
PR	18	Charli Jacoby
LK	19	Rachel Ehrecke
BR	20	Freda Tafuna
SH	21	Cass Bargell
BK	22	Sariah Ibarra
BK	23	Cheta Emba
Coach:
Sione Fukofuka

- Ruby Anderson made her test debut for the Wallaroos

=== Round 3 ===
23 May 2025
18:55 AEST (UTC+10)

Australia	7–45	Canada
Try: Miller 44'c Con: Moleka 44'	Report	Try: Hunt 3'c Paquin 10'c Schell 18'c Royer 41'm Scurfield 47'm Tessier 51'c Forteza 71'c Con: Julia Schell (5/7) 4', 10', 19', 52', 71'

Lang Park, Brisbane
Referee: Maggie Cogger-Orr (New Zealand)

Team details

1	PR	Martha Fua
2	HK	Katalina Amosa
3	PR	Bridie O’Gorman
4	LK	Kaitlan Leaney
5	LK	Michaela Leonard
6	BF	Siokapesi Palu (c)
7	OF	Ashley Marsters
8	N8	Tabua Tuinakauvadra
9	SH	Layne Morgan
10	FH	Faitala Moleka
11	LW	Desiree Miller
12	IC	Charlotte Caslick
13	OC	Georgina Friedrichs
14	RW	Biola Dawa
15	FB	Caitlyn Halse
Replacements:
16	HK	Adiana Talakai
17	PR	Bree-Anna Browne
18	PR	Asoiva Karpani
19	LK	Ashley Fernandez
20	BR	Emily Chancellor
21	BR	Ruby Anderson
22	BK	Tia Hinds
23	BK	Trilleen Pomare
Coach:
(England) Joanne Yapp

1	PR	McKinley Hunt
2	HK	Gillian Boag
3	PR	DaLeaka Menin
4	LK	Courtney O'Donnell
5	LK	Tyson Beukeboom
6	BF	Laetitia Royer
7	OF	Karen Paquin
8	N8	Fabiola Forteza
9	SH	Olivia Apps
10	FH	Claire Gallagher
11	LW	Krissy Scurfield
12	IC	Alex Tessier
13	OC	Florence Symonds
14	RW	Alysha Corrigan
15	FB	Julia Schell
Replacements:
16	HK	Emily Tuttosi
17	PR	Mikiela Nelson
18	PR	Rori Wood
19	LK	Julia Omokhuale
20	BK	Caroline Crossley
21	SH	Justine Pelletier
22	CE	Shoshanah Seumanutafa
23	BK	Asia Hogan-Rochester
Coach:
(France) Kévin Rouet

24 May 2025
16:35 NZST (UTC+12)

New Zealand	79–14	United States
Try: Vaha'akolo (4) 11'c, 15'm, 37'm, 64'c Woodman-Wickliffe (7) 24'm, 26'c, 41'm, 45'c, 58'c, 69'm, 82'm Demant 48'c Waaka 74'c Con: Demant (4/8) 12', 27', 46', 49'; King (3/5) 59', 65', 75'	Report	Try: Tafuna 7'c Rogers 29'c Con: Hawkins (2/2) 8', 30'

North Harbour Stadium, Albany
Referee: Sara Cox (England)

Team Details

LP	1	Kate Henwood
HK	2	Georgia Ponsonby
TP	3	Veisinia Mahutariki-Fakalelu
LL	4	Alana Bremner
RL	5	Maiakawanakaulani Roos
BF	6	Liana Mikaele-Tu'u
OF	7	Jorja Miller
N8	8	Kaipo Olsen-Baker
SH	9	Risaleaana Pouri-Lane
FH	10	Ruahei Demant (cc)
LW	11	Katelyn Vahaakolo
IC	12	Theresa Setefano
OC	13	Stacey Waaka
RW	14	Portia Woodman-Wickliffe
FB	15	Braxton Sorensen-McGee
Replacements:
HK	16	Vici-Rose Green
PR	17	Awhina Tangen-Wainohu
PR	18	Tanya Kalounivale
FW	19	Chelsea Bremner
FW	20	Kennedy Tukuafu (cc)
FW	21	Maia Joseph
BK	22	Hannah King
BK	23	Logo-I-Pulotu Lemapu-Atai’i Sylvia Brunt
Coach:
Allan Bunting

1	PR	Hope Rogers
2	HK	Paige Stathopoulos
3	PR	Keia Mae Sagapolu
4	LK	Hallie Taufo'ou
5	LK	Erica Jarrell
6	BF	Freda Tafuna
7	OF	Kate Zackary (c)
8	N8	Rachel Johnson
9	SH	Olivia Ortiz
10	FH	Sariah Ibarra
11	LW	Cheta Emba
12	IC	McKenzie Hawkins
13	OC	Ilona Maher
14	RW	Emily Henrich
15	FB	Bulou Mataitoga
Replacements:
16	HK	Kathryn Treder
17	PR	Alivia Leatherman
18	PR	Charli Jacoby
19	LK	Rachel Ehrecke
20	BR	Tahlia Brody
21	SH	Cassidy Bargell
22	FH	Nicole Heavirland
23	BK	Tess Feury
Coach:
(Australia) Sione Fukofuka

== Player statistics ==
=== Most points ===
Rank	Name	Team	Points
1	Portia Woodman-Wickliffe	New Zealand	35
2	Ruahei Demant	New Zealand	26
3	Julia Schell	Canada	23
4	Ayesha Leti-I’iga	New Zealand	20
4	Katelyn Vaha'akolo	New Zealand	20
4	Hope Rogers	United States	20
7	Braxton Sorensen-McGee	New Zealand	15
8	McKenzie Hawkins	United States	12
9	Faitala Moleka	Australia	11
10	Eva Karpani	Australia	10
10	Ashley Marsters	Australia	10
10	Sylvia Brunt	New Zealand	10

=== Most tries ===
Rank	Name	Team	Tries
1	Portia Woodman-Wickliffe	New Zealand	7
2	Ayesha Leti-I’iga	New Zealand	4
2	Katelyn Vaha'akolo	New Zealand	4
2	Hope Rogers	United States	4
5	Braxton Sorensen-McGee	New Zealand	3
6	Eva Karpani	Australia	2
6	Ashley Marsters	Australia	2
6	Sylvia Brunt	New Zealand	2
10	26 players		1

== See also ==
- 2025 Laurie O'Reilly Cup
