= Katalina Amosa =

Australia international rugby union player

- Born: 26 May 2001 (age 25) Riverwood, NSW, Australia
- Height: 164 cm (5 ft 5 in)
- Weight: 78 kg (172 lb; 12 st 4 lb)

Rugby union career
- Position: Hooker
Super Rugby
| Years | Team | Apps | (Points) |
| 2024–2025 | ACT Brumbies | | |
| 2026 | Western Force | | |
International career
| Years | Team | Apps | (Points) |
| 2025 | Australia | 9 | (10) |

Katalina Amosa (born 26 May 2001) is an Australian rugby union player. She competed for Australia at the 2025 Women's Rugby World Cup.

== Early career ==
Amosa played netball growing up. She played for Macquarie Uni Rays in the AON Uni sevens competition and also debuted for the Australian schoolgirls sevens team in 2018.

== Rugby career ==
Amosa joined the Brumbies in the Super Rugby Women's competition in 2024. She made a comeback after she suffered a long-term knee injury which hampered her 2024 season.

She made her international debut against Fiji in May 2025. She started against New Zealand, and Canada in the Pacific Four Series and played in the two-test series against Wales, scoring a try in the second match. She was also named in the Wallaroos squad for the Women's Rugby World Cup in England. She featured for the side against Samoa, and the United States, and also faced Canada in their quarter-final clash.

In December 2025, she joined the Western Force for the 2026 Super Rugby Women's season after two seasons with the Brumbies.

== Personal life ==
She is the younger sister of Wallabies player, Brandon Paenga-Amosa. The Amosas are the third sister-brother combo to represent Australia in test rugby, with her brother making his debut in 2018.
