= Shoshanah Seumanutafa =

Canada international rugby union player

- Born: 17 September 1999 (age 27) White Rock, B.C, Canada
- Height: 163 cm (5 ft 4 in)

Rugby union career
- Position: Centre
Provincial / State sides
Years	Team	Apps	(Points)
2024–	Counties Manukau	5	(0)
Super Rugby
Years	Team	Apps	(Points)
2025–	Chiefs Manawa	4	(0)
International career
Years	Team	Apps	(Points)
2023–Present	Canada	25	(5)
Medal record
Women's rugby union
Representing Canada
World Cup
Silver medal – second place	2025 England	Team competition

Shoshanah Seumanutafa (born 17 September 1999) is a Canadian rugby union player. She plays Centre for Canada internationally and for Chiefs Manawa in the Super Rugby Aupiki competition in New Zealand.

== Early career ==
Seumanutafa was born in White Rock, British Columbia and is of Samoan descent. Her father Pose Seumanutafa is an assistant coach for the women's team in Trinity Western University and Bayside RFC. She initially played football until her final year of high school. She only started playing rugby union in her second year of high school and ended up giving up football.

She studied at the University of British Columbia where she played for the UBC Thunderbirds rugby team. She helped the team win three consecutive Canada West Championships as well as their first title in rugby sevens. She has been named Canada West Player of the Year twice.

== Rugby career ==
In the fall of 2023, she was called up to the Canadian team to participate in the inaugural WXV 1 tournament in New Zealand.

She joined the Chiefs Manawa in the Super Rugby Aupiki competition in 2024; however, she only trained with the team but did not play any matches. In April 2024, she was called up to the national team for the Pacific Four Series, which Canada eventually won. She was notably a starter against the United States and New Zealand. She was also called up to the Canadian development team which toured Spain in June.

She was selected in the Canadian squad for the 2025 Pacific Four Series. In July 2025, she was named in Canada's Rugby World Cup squad.
