= Rachel Smith (rugby union) =

Canada international rugby union player

- Born: 7 April 2001 (age 25)
- Height: 175 cm (5 ft 9 in)
- Weight: 77 kg (170 lb)

Rugby union career
- Position: Lock
Senior career
Years	Team	Apps	(Points)
2020–	UBC Thunderbirds		(0)
International career
Years	Team	Apps	(Points)
2025–	Canada	4	(0)
Medal record
Representing Canada
Women's rugby union
World Cup
Silver medal – second place	2025 England	Team competition

Rachel Carmen Smith (born 7 April 2001) is a Canadian rugby union player. She was a member of Canada's squad that were runner-up at the 2025 Women's Rugby World Cup.

== Rugby career ==
=== Club ===
In 2020, Smith started playing for the University of British Columbia Thunderbirds. In 2024, she was named BC's Rugby 15s Player of the Year.

=== International ===
Smith made her international debut for Canada against the United States in May during the 2025 Pacific Four Series. In August, she only had three caps when she made the Canadian squad for the 2025 Women's Rugby World Cup in England.
