= Morgane Bourgeois =

France international rugby union player

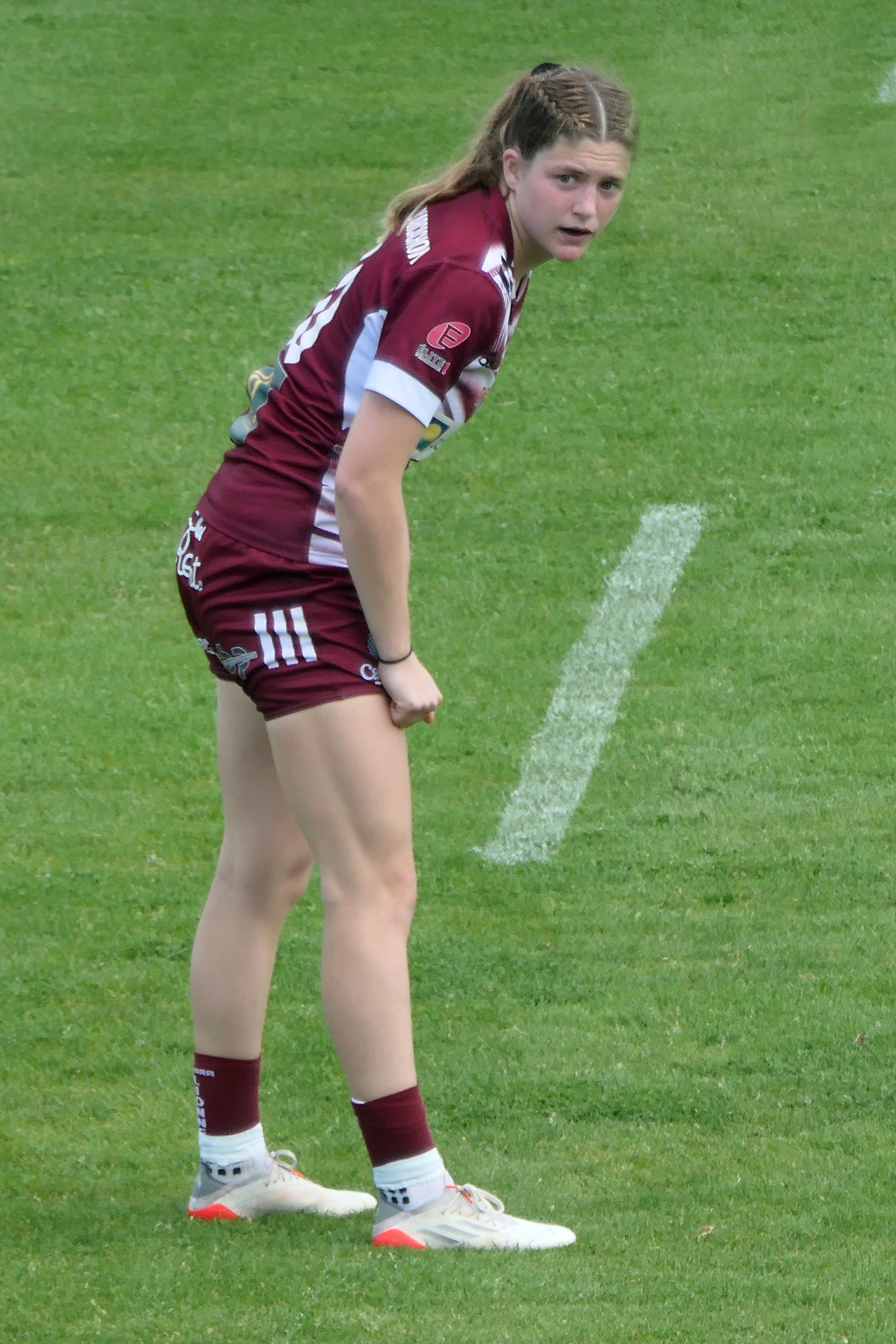
- Bourgeois with Stade Bordelais in 2022
- Born: 6 February 2003 (age 23)
- Height: 172 cm (5 ft 8 in)

Rugby union career
- Position(s): Fullback, Fly-half
- Current team: Stade Bordelais
Senior career
Years	Team	Apps	(Points)
2020–	Stade Bordelais		(0)
International career
Years	Team	Apps	(Points)
2023–	France	18	(137)

Morgane Bourgeois (born 6 February 2003) is a French rugby union player who plays as a fullback for Stade Bordelais and the French national team.

== Biography ==
=== Early life and education ===
As a child, she played soccer for four and a half years.

Bourgeois began playing rugby at the age of ten in Parempuyre, where her father, a schoolteacher, founded the local rugby school. She was the only girl on her team during her early years. In her fourth year of secondary school, she joined the sports study program at Collège Victor Louis in Talence. At 15, Bourgeois joined the academy of Stade Bordelais. She later pursued a degree in Sports Science at the University of Bordeaux. As of 2025, Bourgeois is pursuing a degree in journalism and contributes articles to RugbyPass and works as an intern in sports marketing and communications.

=== Club career ===
==== Stade Bordelais (2020-present) ====
Bourgeois has played for Stade Bordelais since 2020. Initially a fly-half, she later transitioned to the fullback position.

=== International career ===
Bourgeois was captain of the national U20 team in 2022.

In June 2022, Bourgeois was named in the 38-player squad selected to prepare for the 2021 Women's Rugby World Cup (Note: The 2021 Rugby World Cup was held in 2022 due to the COVID-19 pandemic.) in New Zealand. At the time, she was uncapped at the senior level and one of four players in the group yet to make an international appearance. She was not ultimately selected for the final 32-player tournament squad.

==== 2023 Women's Six Nations ====
On 1 April 2023, Bourgeois played her first match for the French national team during the 2023 Women's Six Nations Championship against Ireland, contributing to a 53–3 victory. She signed her first semi-professional contract with the French Rugby Federation in early 2023, however, her contract was not renewed in 2024.

==== 2023 WXV ====
In the autumn of 2023, she was part of the team competing in the 2023 WXV in New Zealand, starting three times.

==== 2024 Women's Six Nations ====
Bougeois was selected for the 2024 Women's Six Nations, she played the first four matches off the bench, but not the final game against England.

==== 2024 WXV ====
She was absent from the WXV tournament in 2024.

==== 2025 Women's Six Nations ====
As of April 2025, she has earned 10 caps and scored 61 points for France. In the 2025 Women's Six Nations opener against Ireland, she scored 12 points, maintaining a 100% success rate in her kicks. Morgane Bourgeois scored 20 points in France's 38–15 win over Scotland, including 15 points from penalties and conversions, plus one try. On 12 April 2025, Bourgeois contributed 10 points in France's 42–12 victory over Wales, converting all five of France's kickable tries. On 19 April 2025, during the fourth round, Bourgeois scored a try, a penalty, and two conversions against Italy, for a total of 12 points. Despite missing two kicks at goal, she contributed to France's 34–21 victory.

On 2 August, she was named in the French side to the 2025 Women's Rugby World Cup.

== Honours ==
=== Stade Bordelais ===
- French Championship (Élite 1 Féminine) : 2023, 2024.
