= Taylor Perry (rugby union) =

Canadian rugby union and sevens player

- Born: 23 July 2000 (age 26) Oakville, Ontario
- Height: 164 cm (5 ft 5 in)
- Weight: 67 kg (148 lb; 10 st 8 lb)

Rugby union career
- Position: Fly-Half
- Current team: Exeter Chiefs
Senior career
Years	Team	Apps	(Points)
2020; 2024–	Exeter Chiefs	22	(20)
International career
Years	Team	Apps	(Points)
	Canada	22	(20)
- Correct as of 2025-09-27
National sevens team
Years	Team		Comps
2024–	Canada		
Medal record
Representing Canada
Women's rugby sevens
Olympic Games
Silver medal – second place	2024 Paris	Team competition
Women's rugby union
World Cup
Silver medal – second place	2025 England	Team competition

Taylor Elizabeth Perry (born 23 July 2000) is a Canadian rugby union and rugby sevens player. She won a silver medal at the 2024 Summer Olympics.

== Rugby career ==
Perry was named in Canada's squad for the delayed 2021 Rugby World Cup in New Zealand. She was ruled out of the World Cup after she sustained a serious knee injury during training in preparation for their opening match against Japan.

Perry signed for English club Exeter Chiefs Women in 2024, after playing 14 league matches for the club in a stint in 2020.

Having been picked as a travelling reserve for the 2024 Summer Olympics in Paris, France, Perry was drafted into the side as an injury replacement for Krissy Scurfield during the tournament. The team won a silver medal, coming from 0–12 behind to defeat Australia 21–12 in the semi-finals, before losing the final to New Zealand.

She was named in Canada's squad for the 2025 Pacific Four Series. In July 2025, she made the selection in Canada's Rugby World Cup squad.
