= Ruby Anderson (rugby union) =

Australia international rugby union player

- Born: 8 May 2007 (age 19) Gosford, Australia
- Height: 165 cm (5 ft 5 in)

Rugby union career
- Position: Loose Forward
Super Rugby
Years	Team	Apps	(Points)
2024–	NSW Waratahs		
International career
Years	Team	Apps	(Points)
2025–	Australia	2	(0)

Ruby Anderson (born 8 May 2007) is an Australian rugby union player. She represents Australia internationally and plays for the NSW Waratahs in the Super Rugby Women's competition.

== Early career ==
Anderson started playing rugby at the age of nine, at Avoca Beach RC. In her first season with Sydney University FC, they won the Jack Scott Cup in 2024.

== Rugby career ==
Anderson was selected in the Wallaroos side for the 2024 WXV 2 tournament but did not play any matches.

She won the 2025 Super Rugby Women's season with the NSW Waratahs. She was then selected for the Pacific Four Series where she made her international debut for Australia against the United States. She represented Australia A against Samoa in Canberra and won player-of-the-match.
