= CorpAcq Stadium =

Rugby stadium in Greater Manchester, England

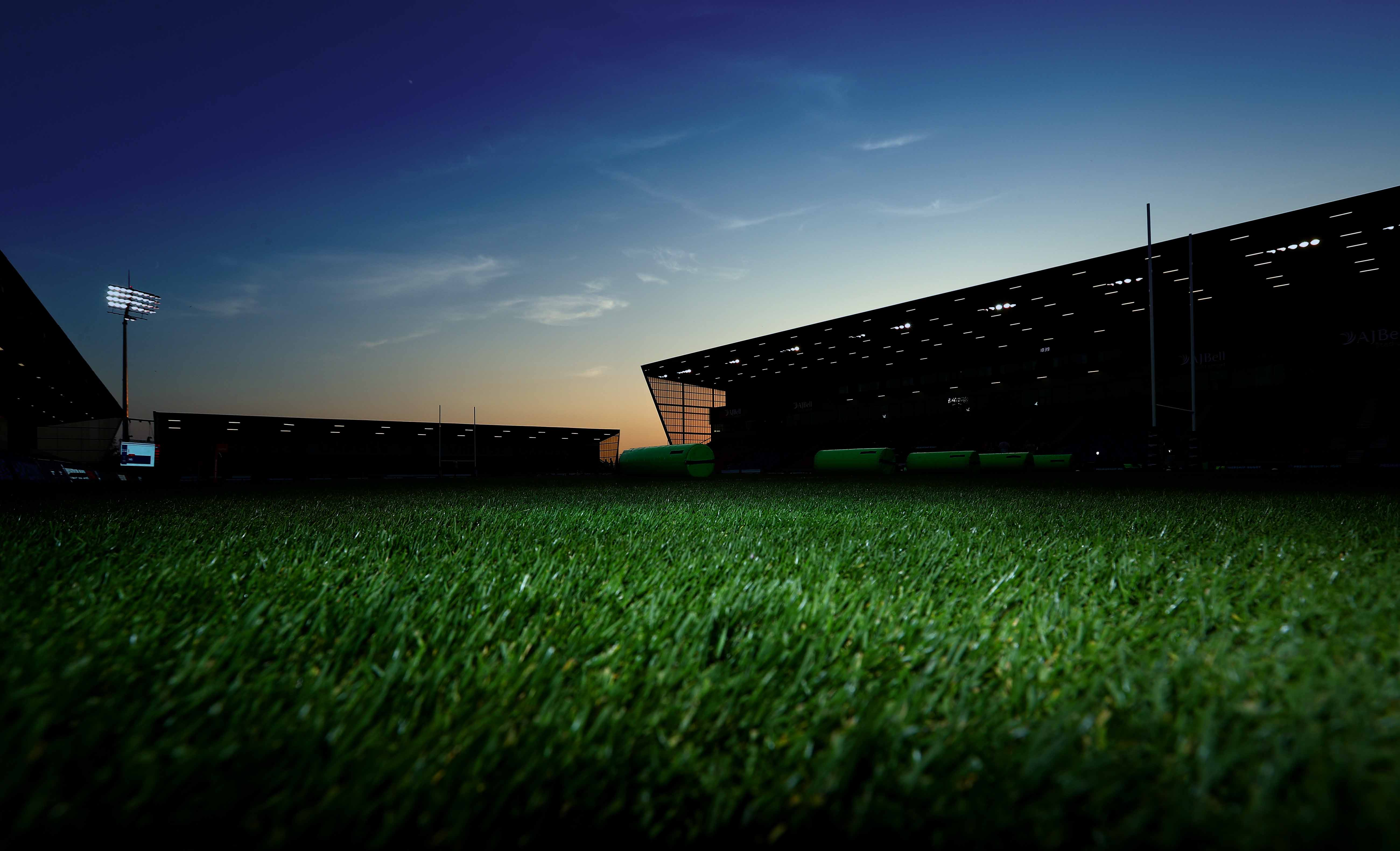

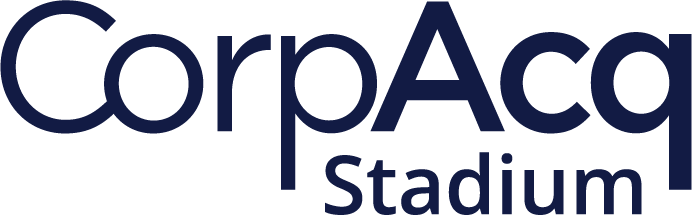
- CorpAcq Stadium
- Interactive map of CorpAcq Stadium
- Full name: CorpAcq Stadium
- Former names: Salford City Stadium (2012–2013) AJ Bell Stadium (2013–2023) Salford Community Stadium (2023–2025)
- Location: 1 Stadium Way; Barton-upon-Irwell; M30 7EY
- Coordinates: 53°28′10″N 2°22′30″W
- Capacity: 11,404
- Executive suites: 12-20 person hospitality boxes and 1 banqueting suite (up to 750)
- Surface: Grass
- Scoreboard: Electronic
- Record attendance: 11,247 (Sale Sharks v Leicester Tigers) 27 December 2014
- Field size: 122m x 86m

Construction
- Built: 2010–11
- Opened: 2012
- Cost: £26 million
- Architect: AFL Architects
- Structural engineer: SKM
- Main contractor: Buckingham Group

Tenants
- Rugby League; Salford RLFC (2012–); Rugby Union; Sale Sharks (2012–); Football; Manchester United FC Reserves (2013–14); American Football; Manchester Titans (2014)

The CorpAcq Stadium is a rugby stadium in Barton-upon-Irwell, England, built to replace Salford rugby league club's ground the Willows for the 2012 season. Sale Sharks rugby union club have also played at the stadium since the 2012–13 season.

== Ownership ==
=== Initial development ===
In 2005, Salford City Council approved plans for the Reds to move from the Willows to the brownfield site at Barton.

The stadium was originally to be developed by Red City Developments, with construction to be complete for the start of the 2009 season. However, RCD went into administration in July 2008.

Salford City Council formed a joint venture company with Peel Group to develop and deliver the £16 million stadium, which is part of the a £26 million development close to the Manchester Ship Canal and the M60 motorway.

Planning permission was granted in March 2010 for a 15,000-capacity stadium.

Sale Sharks confirmed their move to the stadium in April 2012, signing a 25-year lease.

In 2013, Peel Group and Salford City Council each lent £600,000 in emergency funding to the stadium. The council is still owed £20 million for building the stadium, and is already owed £1.5m by the Salford City Reds who play at the stadium.

In 2014, Salford City Council and Peel lent a further £410,724 to the stadium.

=== 2022–24 sale ===
In December 2022 Salford City Council announced their intent to acquire Peel Group's 50% share in the stadium's operating company, following the rejection of a joint bid from Salford City FC and Sale Sharks, with the intention to use the future development of the site to improve the community offering, and create opportunities to pay off the £37million in debt the stadium had accrued. In November 2023, Salford Red Devils opposed the deal, citing a lack of progress with the council in 3 years of negotiations for a new lease on more favourable terms. In December 2023, Salford Red Devils were granted a short term extension to allow them to complete the 2024 Super League season at the stadium.

On 13 February 2024, Salford City Council agreed a decision to buy the stadium in full, with Cabinet approval granted on 3 September 2024; the deal was eventually completed on 13 December 2024.

=== AJ Bell sponsorship ===
On 13 September 2013, it was announced that investment platform AJ Bell had secured a nine-year stadium naming rights partnership with Sale Sharks Rugby Club. The deal saw Salford City Stadium re-branded and renamed AJ Bell Stadium. The deal concluded following the 2022–23 rugby union season, and the stadium reverted to its original name.

=== CorpAcq sponsorship ===
On 17 September 2025, Sale Sharks announced that the stadium would be renamed the CorpAcq Stadium in a multi-year naming rights agreement.

== Facilities ==
The stadium capacity (since inception) was designed to accommodate a crowd of 12,000, although the General Safety Certificate shows a current certified capacity of 11,404 as of 2023. However, with further construction, the space exists to expand the capacity to 20,000 spectators. The stadium has areas designated for standing supporters. This partial-standing design is similar to the Halliwell Jones Stadium, home of Warrington RLFC.

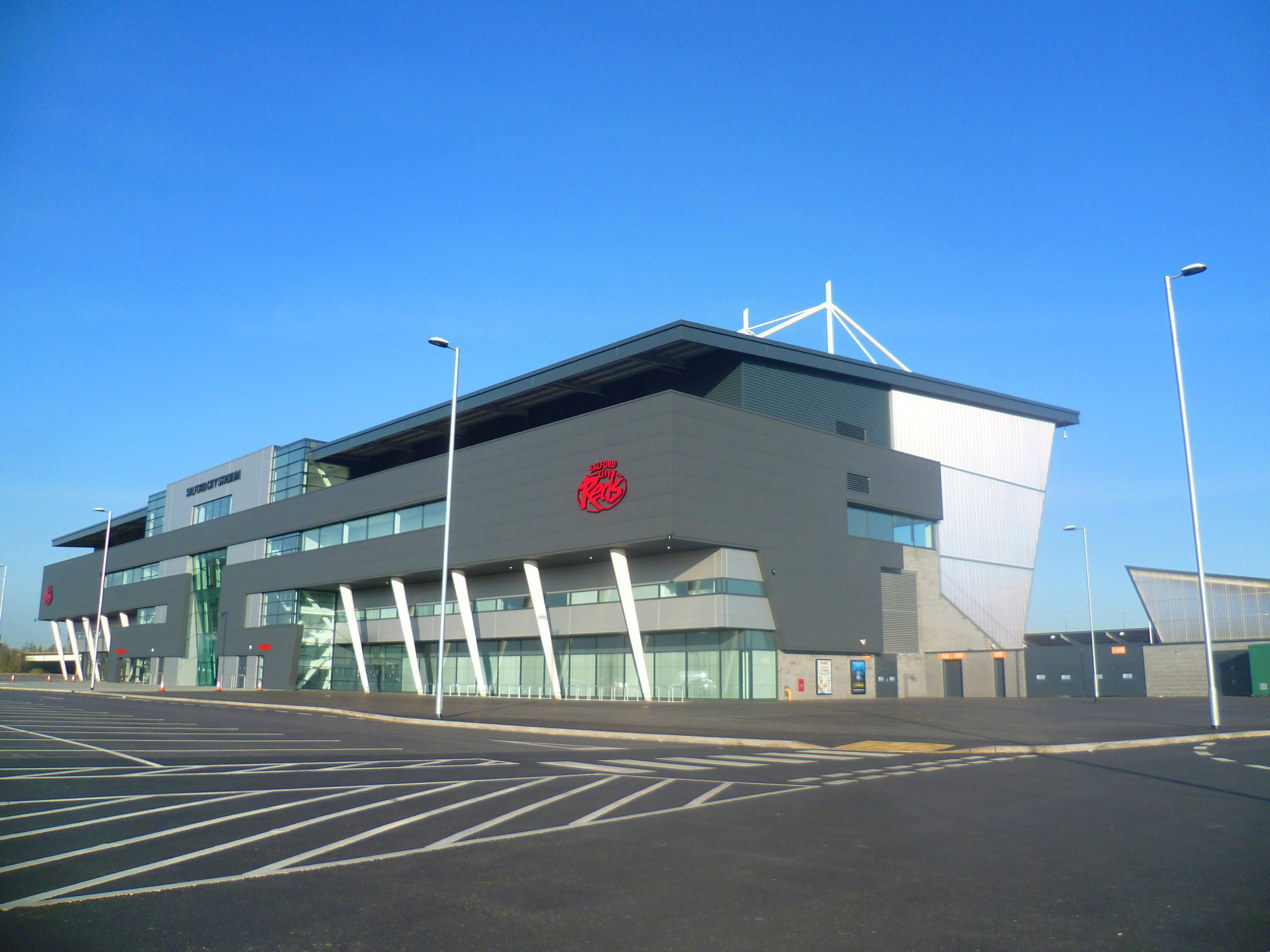
Salford City Stadium in 2012

There are four stands:

- West Stand (main stand) including changing rooms, media centre, ticket office, hospitality boxes, banqueting suite; certified capacity 4,764
- Fords of Winsford North Stand – all-standing, usually the away end; certified capacity 2,248
- Toshiba/Viessmann Stand (East) - all seating, certified capacity 2,132
- Morson South Stand – all-standing, home to hardcore Reds fans; similar in design to the North Stand, but with "Community Changing" rooms accessed from the outside to support the external 3G and grass pitches. The south stand community changing area also includes a gym space used by the Salford Rugby Team. Certified capacity 2,260

The seats in the West and East Stands are red (for Salford) and blue (for Sale).

The development also includes offices, player facilities, concessions, community resources and two community outdoor sport pitches, a membership gym and the Sale Sharks Club Shop.

== Events ==
=== Rugby league ===
The Reds played their first league game at the new stadium against Castleford on 4 February 2012; Castleford won 10–24.

The 2012 Challenge Cup Semi Final was held at the stadium on 15 July 2012 – Warrington beat Huddersfield 33–6.

The 2012 Autumn International Series Final took place at the stadium on 11 November 2012, attendance was 7,921.

On 7 November 2013 the stadium hosted the Rugby League World Cup match between Scotland and USA. A crowd of 6,041 watched Scotland beat the USA 22 – 8.

Salford's record attendance at the stadium is 10,867 against Leigh Leopards in the Super League playoffs on 27 September 2024.

Summary

List of test and International tournament matches played at Salford Community Stadium.

Game#	Date	Team 1	Score	Team 2	Attendance	Competition
1	11 November 2012	England	48–4	France	7,921	2012 Autumn International Series Final
2	7 November 2013	Scotland	22–8	United States	6,041	2013 World Cup

=== Rugby union ===
Sale Sharks' first game at the stadium was a friendly on 24 August 2012 against Leinster Rugby, which ended 10–10. Their first competitive game was against Saracens on 8 September 2012. The score was Sale 16–23 Saracens and the attendance was 7,451.

The stadium served as one of the two venues for the 2016 World Rugby Under 20 Championship. England beat Ireland 45–21 in the final at the stadium. On 14 May 2023, the stadium hosted a Gallagher Premiership play-off semi-final between Sale Sharks and Leicester Tigers, where Sale won 21–13 in front of an attendance of 9,980.

=== 2025 Women's Rugby Union World Cup ===
In August 2023, the stadium was confirmed as one of eight host venues for the 2025 Women's Rugby World Cup, with the two matchdays drawing 10,054 and 9,803 spectators espectively.

2025 Women's Rugby Union World Cup matches held at Salford Community Stadium
Date	Country	Score	Country	Stage of Tournament	Ref
23 August 2025	Australia	73–0	Samoa	Pool stage (Pool A)	
23 August 2025	Scotland	38–8	Wales	Pool stage (Pool B)	
30 August 2025	Canada	42-0	Wales	Pool stage (Pool B)	
30 August 2025	Scotland	29-15	Fiji	Pool stage (Pool B)	

=== Other sports ===
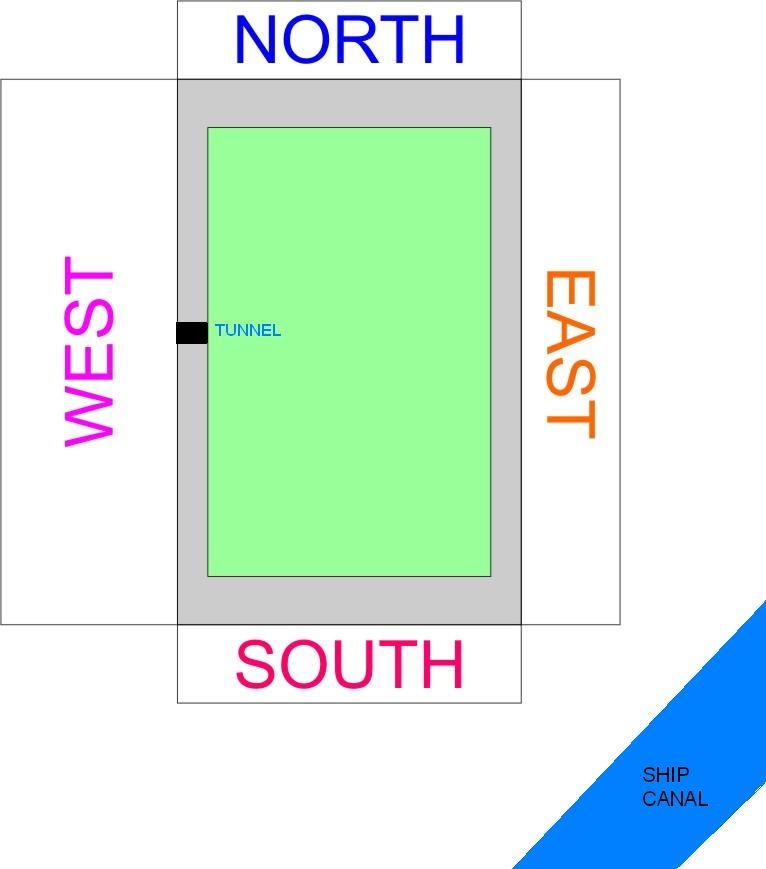
Stadium layout

==== American football ====
BAFA National Leagues side Manchester Titans held a trial game at the Stadium against Crewe Railroaders on 1 June 2014. It was stated that they could hold future fixtures inside the stadium if the trial was successful. The Titans beat the Railroaders 69–0 and the attendance was 1,349.

==== Association football ====
For the 2013–14 season, Manchester United's under-21 team played all their home games at the stadium.

The stadium also hosted England women's Euro 2013 qualifying match against the Netherlands on 17 June 2012.

== Attendances ==
Salford Red Devils					Sale Sharks				
League	Fixtures	Average Attendance	Highest	Lowest	League	Fixtures	Average Attendance	Highest	Lowest
2012 Super League	12 (Note: Salford's last home fixture was played at Leigh Sports Village due to a fixture clash with co-tenants Sale Sharks.)	4,442	6,891	2,380	2012–13 Premiership	11	6,291	8,783	4,307
2013 Super League	13	3,125	5,383	1,989	2013–14 Premiership	11	6,350	10,092	5,372
2014 Super League	13	4,738	7,102	2,903	2014–15 Premiership	11	6,660	11,247	4,753
2015 Super League	11	4,167	6,561	1,972	2015–16 Premiership	11	6,152	7,687	4,236
2016 Super League	11	3,625	5,089	1,958	2016–17 Premiership	11	6,202	8,828	4,299
2017 Super League	11	4,480	6,527	2,678	2017–18 Premiership	11	6,274	10,050	4,510
2018 Super League	11	2,966	5,568	2,248	2018–19 Premiership	11	6,586	8,535	5,290
2019 Super League	14	3,676	5,393	2,368	2019–20 Premiership	11	7,175	8,579	0 (behind closed doors)
2020 Super League	11	2,784	4,796	0 (behind closed doors)	2020–21 Premiership	11	466 (limited games with fans)	2,800 (restricted capacity)	0 (behind closed doors)
2021 Super League	10	2,000	4,000	0 (behind closed doors)	2021–22 Premiership	12	5,948	8,214	3,697
2022 Super League	13	4,529	6,041	2,607	2022–23 Premiership	10	6,619	10,136	3,969
2023 Super League	13	5,383	7,854	3,836	2023–24 Premiership	9	7,451	9,675	4,574
2024 Super League	13	4,645	10,867	2,843	2024-25 Premiership	9	7,331	8,125	6,227

== Notes ==
Preceded by The Willows; 1901–2011	Salford Red Devils home ground 2012–present	Succeeded by current
Preceded by Edgeley Park; 2003–2012	Sale Sharks home ground 2012–present	Succeeded by current
