= Leia Brebner-Holden =

English-born Scottish international rugby union player

- Born: 26 May 2002 (age 24) Taunton, Somerset, England
- Height: 1.63 m (5 ft 4 in)
- Weight: 63 kg (139 lb; 9 st 13 lb)

Rugby union career
- Position: Scrum-half
- Current team: Loughborough Lightning
Amateur team(s)
Years	Team	Apps	(Points)
–	Al Ain Amblers		
–	UAE Sand Cats		
Senior career
Years	Team	Apps	(Points)
2017–2018	Wellington RFC Women		
–2024	Cheltenham Tigers Women		
2023–2024	Gloucester-Hartpury		
2024–	Loughborough Lightning		
International career
Years	Team	Apps	(Points)
- Scotland U20
2024–	Scotland	15	(5)
- Correct as of 26 September 2025

Leia Brebner-Holden (born 26 May 2002), is an English born Scottish rugby union player who often plays Scrum-half. She plays for Gloucester-Hartpury in Premiership Women's Rugby, Cheltenham Tigers Women in the English second division, as well as the Scotland national team.

== Early life and career ==
Brebner-Holden was born in Taunton, Somerset to an English father and a Scottish mother, She began playing rugby union in the United Arab Emirates, with the Al Ain Amblers club at age 9 and she also played for the UAE Sand Cats. When she returned to the UK, she earned rugby scholarships with Hartpury College and University. She then went on to join Gloucester-Hartpury where she was dual-registered with local second division club Cheltenham Tigers Women.

== Rugby career ==
Brebner-Holden was selected for Scotland's 2024 Six Nations squad, where head coach Bryan Easson considered her to be "the 24th/25th player in the team", on the doorstep of the selection. During the summer of 2024, she played with the Scottish Under-20 team at the Six Nations Summer Series in Italy. She was named in the squad for the 2024 WXV 2 tournament.

Brebner-Holden won her first cap in a warm-up match against Wales and made her first starting XV's appearance in Scotland's last game of the tournament proper against Australia. In October 2024, she joined Loughborough Lightning.

She was named in Scotland's squad for the 2025 Six Nations Championship in March. She was also selected in the Scottish side for the Women's Rugby World Cup in England.
