= Kolora Lomani =

Fiji international rugby union player (b.1999)

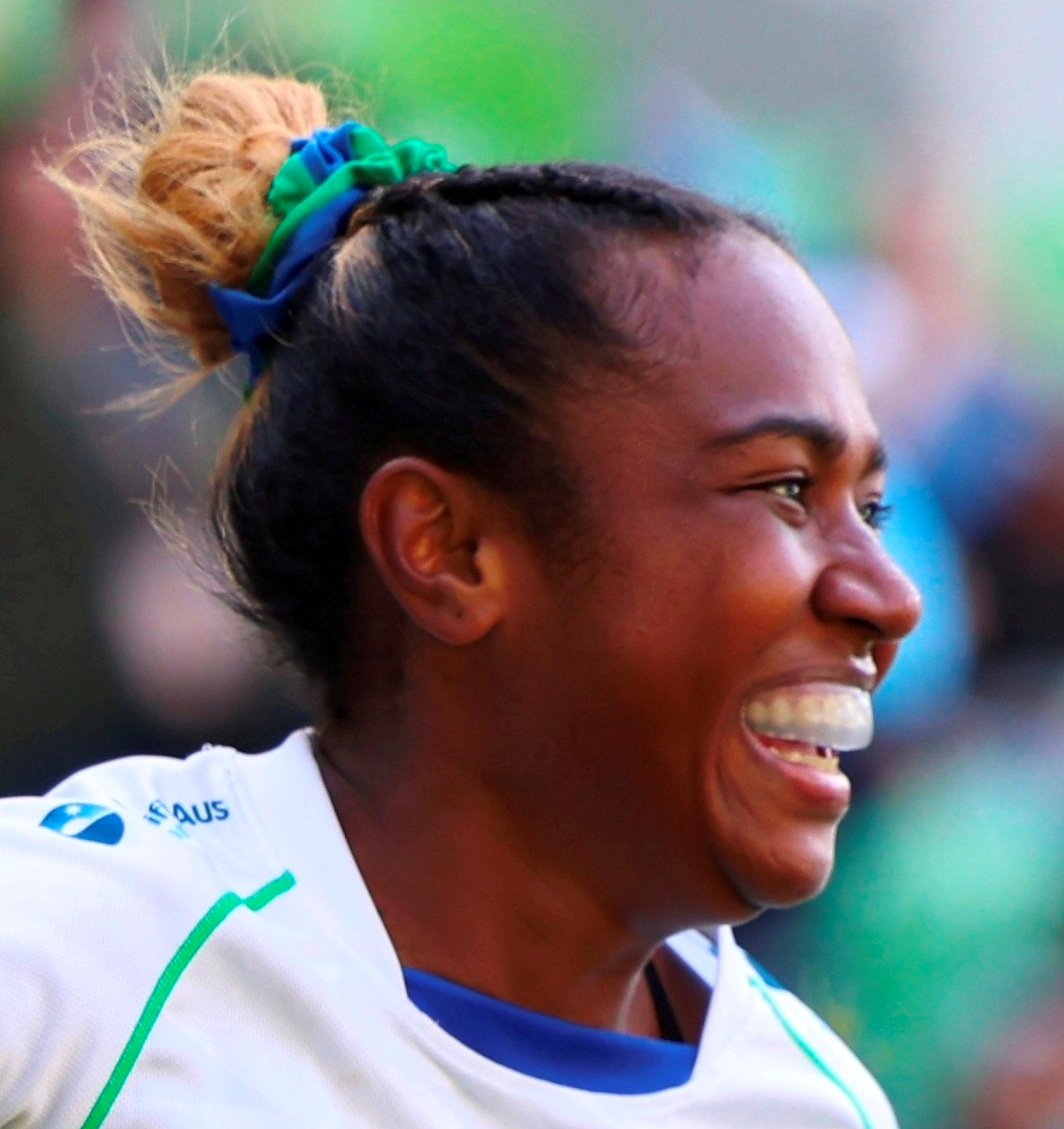
- Born: 22 July 1999 (age 27) Lautoka
- Height: 169 cm (5 ft 7 in)

Rugby union career
- Position: Fly-half
Provincial / State sides
Years	Team	Apps	(Points)
2017–2020	Northern United		(0)
2019	Wellington Pride		(0)
Super Rugby
Years	Team	Apps	(Points)
2022-2023; 2025	Fijian Drua		(0)
2024	ACT Brumbies		(0)
International career
Years	Team	Apps	(Points)
2022–	Fiji	21	(25)
National sevens team
Years	Team		Comps
2024–-	Fiji 7s		

Kolora Lomani (born 22 July 1999) is a Fijian rugby union player. She was selected for the Rugby sevens at the 2024 Paris Olympics. She also competed for the Fijiana fifteens at the 2021 and 2025 Women's Rugby World Cups.

== Early life ==
From Kadavu Island, she was born in Lautoka and brought up in Vatukoula, before her family moved to New Zealand when she was six-years-old.

== Career ==
She was part of the Wellington Under-18s girls' rugby team from 2013 to 2017 and Northern United Rugby Women's Team from 2017 to 2020. In 2019 she made her debut for Wellington Pride women's rugby team.

She played for Fiji at the delayed 2021 Rugby World Cup in September 2022. She was part of the Fijian Drua Women side that lifted the Super W title in 2022.

She later played Super Rugby Women's rugby with ACT Brumbies. She was called into the Fiji women's national rugby sevens team in May 2024. She was subsequently named in the Fiji sevens team for the 2024 Paris Olympics in July 2024.

On 9 August 2025, she was named in the Fijiana XVs side to the Women's Rugby World Cup in England.
