= Freda Tafuna =

American rugby union player

- Born: August 31, 2003 (age 23) Orange County, California, U.S.
- Height: 173 cm (5 ft 8 in)
- Weight: 68 kg (150 lb)
- University: Lindenwood University

Rugby union career
- Position: Flanker
International career
Years	Team	Apps	(Points)
2023–	United States	17	(55)

Freda Tafuna (born August 31, 2003) is an American rugby union player who plays as a flanker. She represents the United States internationally and plays collegiately for Lindenwood University.

== Early life and education ==
Tafuna was born in Orange County, California, and is of Tongan descent. She grew up as one of seven siblings and initially played soccer and basketball before switching to rugby at age 16 during a school tournament. She later joined her high school rugby team and was recruited to play for Lindenwood University, where she also pursued her studies.

== Rugby career ==
=== University ===
At Lindenwood, Tafuna became a standout collegiate player. In 2024, she helped the team reach the national championship final, narrowly losing to Life University. She won the MA Sorensen Award, given annually to the best collegiate women's rugby player in the United States.

In 2025, Tafuna helped Lindenwood win the national championship and won the MA Sorensen Award again, becoming the first athlete to claim the honour twice in its 10-year history.

=== International ===
Tafuna made her international debut for the United States in the 2023 Pacific Four Series against Australia. She scored her first international try the following week against New Zealand.

In May 2024, she became the first American woman to score tries in consecutive test matches against New Zealand.

She was not selected for the 2024 WXV tournament but returned to the national team for the 2025 Pacific Four Series. On July 17, she was selected for the 2025 Women's Rugby World Cup that will be held in England. She scored a hat-trick in the United States' pool stage draw against Australia at the York Community Stadium. Tafuna scored four tries for the Eagles in their final World Cup match against Samoa.

== Honours ==
=== University ===
- US Collegiate Championship finalist: 2024
- US Collegiate Championship winner: 2025

=== Individual ===
- MA Sorensen Award: 2024, 2025 (first back-to-back winner)
