= Gillian Boag =

Canada international dual-code rugby player

- Born: 19 February 1995 (age 31)
- Height: 5 ft 5 in (165 cm)

Rugby union career
- Position: Hooker
Senior career
Years	Team	Apps	(Points)
2024–2025	Gloucester–Hartpury		(0)
International career
Years	Team	Apps	(Points)
	Canada	38	(25)
- Correct as of 2025-09-27
- Rugby league career

Playing information
Representative
Years	Team	Pld	T	G	FG	P
2017	Canada	3				0

Gillian Lorna Boag (born 19 February 1995) is a Canadian rugby union and rugby league player. She competed for Canada at the delayed 2021 Rugby World Cup.

== Rugby career ==
In 2017, Boag was selected for Canada at the 2017 Women's Rugby League World Cup in Australia.

Boag competed for Canada at the delayed 2021 Rugby World Cup in New Zealand. She featured in the knockout stages against the United States, and England; and in the third place final against France.

In 2023, She was named in Canada's squad for their test against the Springbok women and for the Pacific Four Series. She was named on the bench for Canada's match against South Africa in Madrid, Spain. In July, she featured in her sides 21–52 loss to the Black Ferns at the Pacific Series in Ottawa.

In 2024, she joined Gloucester–Hartpury in the Premiership Women's Rugby competition for the 2024–25 season. She was named in Canada's squad for the 2025 Pacific Four Series.

On 24 July 2025, she was selected in Canada's Rugby World Cup squad.

== Honours ==
Gloucester–Hartpury

- Premiership Women's Rugby
  - Champion (1) 2024–25

Canada

- Women's Rugby World Cup
  - (silver) 2025
