= Alex Tessier =

Canada international rugby union player (born 1993)

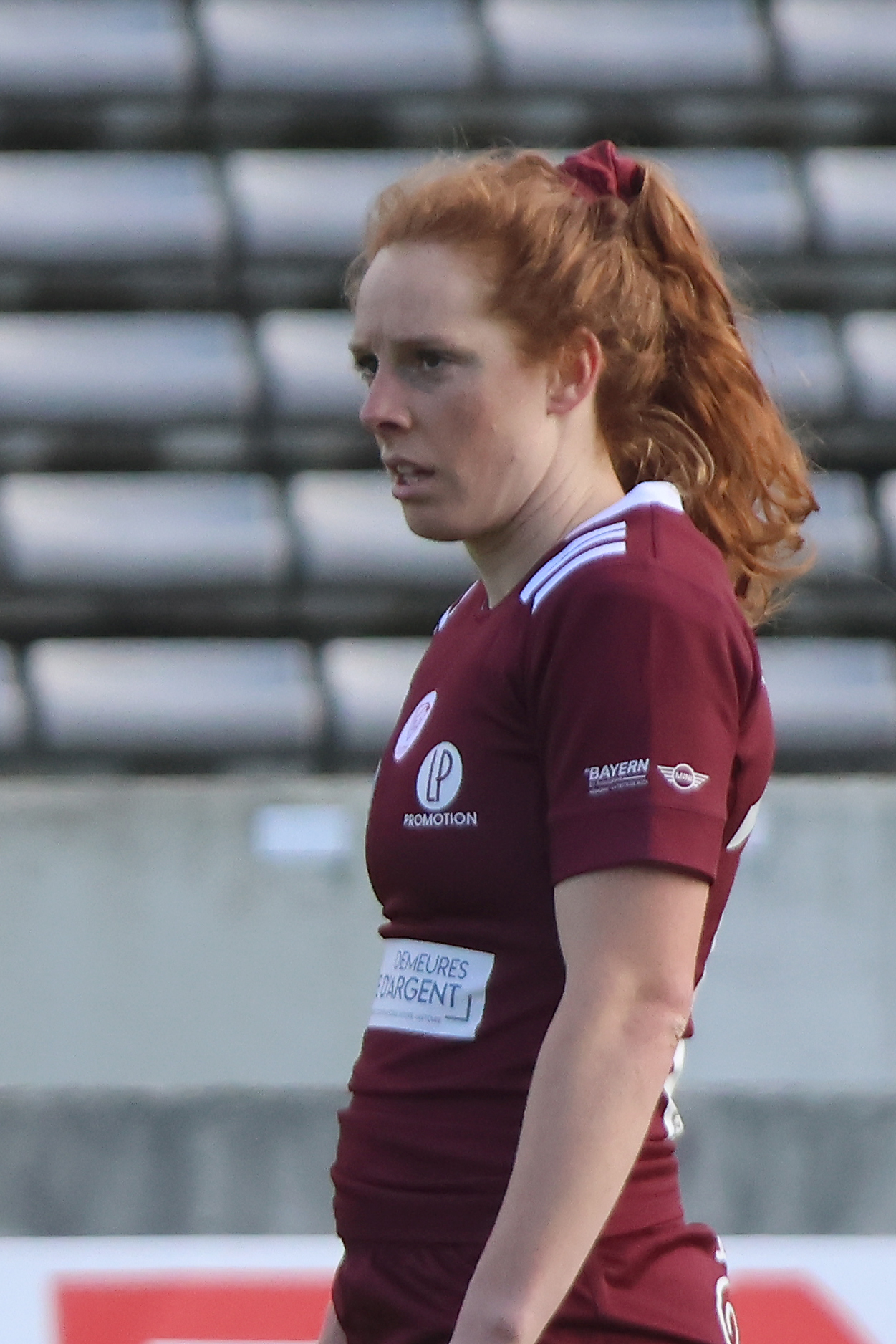
- Born: 3 September 1993 (age 33) Sainte-Clotilde-de-Horton, Quebec
- Height: 1.77 m (5 ft 10 in)
- Weight: 72 kg (159 lb)

Rugby union career
- Position(s): Fly-half, Centre
- Current team: Exeter Chiefs
Senior career
| Years | Team | Apps | (Points) |
| 2023– | Exeter Chiefs | 23 | (66) |
International career
| Years | Team | Apps | (Points) |
| 2015–Present | Canada | 65 | (65) |
- Correct as of 2025-09-27
Medal record
Women's rugby union
Representing Canada
World Cup
| Silver medal – second place | 2025 England | Team competition |

Alexandra Tessier (born 3 September 1993) is a Canadian rugby union player. She has competed for Canada at the 2017, 2021, and 2025 Rugby World Cups. She currently plays for the Exeter Chiefs of Premiership Women's Rugby.

== Rugby career ==
Tessier competed for Canada at the 2017 Women's Rugby World Cup in Ireland.

In 2022, Tessier started in a test-match against Wales, it was a warm-up ahead of the World Cup which Canada won 31–3. She was selected in Canada's squad for the delayed 2021 Rugby World Cup in New Zealand. She scored a try against the Eagles in their quarterfinal encounter. She then featured in the semifinal against England, and in the third place final against France.

Tessier was named in Canada's squad for their test against the Springbok women and for the 2023 Pacific Four Series. She started in her sides 66–7 thrashing of South Africa in Madrid, Spain.

In 2024, she was a member of the Canadian side that had a historic win over New Zealand. She started in all six matches for Canada that year and was nominated for the World Rugby Women's 15s Player of the Year award.

She was selected in Canada's squad for the 2025 Pacific Four Series. In July 2025, she made the selection into Canada's Rugby World Cup squad.
