= Julia Schell =

Canada international rugby union player

- Born: 13 July 1996 (age 30) Uxbridge, Ontario
- Height: 5 ft 5 in (165 cm)

Rugby union career
- Position: Fullback
- Current team: Trailfinders
Senior career
Years	Team	Apps	(Points)
- Guelph Redcoats
International career
Years	Team	Apps	(Points)
2021–	Canada	32	(79)
- Correct as of 2025-09-27
Medal record
Women's rugby union
Representing Canada
World Cup
Silver medal – second place	2025 England	Team competition

Julia Margaret Schell (born 13 July 1996) is a Canadian rugby union player. She competes internationally for Canada, being named for the delayed 2021 Rugby World Cup and again in 2025, and for Trailfinders in Premiership Women's Rugby. She primarily plays fly-half but can also play at fullback.

== Background ==
Schell attended the University of Guelph, where she studied sociology and played rugby for the Guelph Redcoats.

== Rugby career ==
Schell was first capped for Canada against the United States in 2021 and competed for at the delayed 2021 Rugby World Cup in New Zealand. She featured in all three Pool games at the World Cup.

In 2023, She was named in Canada's squad for their test against the Springbok women and for the Pacific Four Series. She scored a try in Canada's 66–7 win over South Africa in Madrid, Spain. She started in her sides Pacific Four loss to the Black Ferns, they went down 21–52.

She was selected in the Canadian side for the 2025 Pacific Four Series.

In July 2025, she was named to Canada's 2025 Rugby World Cup squad. She scored six tries in Canada's 65–7 thrashing of Fiji in their first game of the tournament. It is the most tries scored by a Canadian in a Rugby World Cup match and eventually tied for second in the tournament.

After the 2025 World Cup, Schell returned to Trailfinders and the PWR where she sustained a catastrophic knee injury, sidelining her for the remainder of the PWR season.
