= Justine Pelletier =

Canadian rugby union player

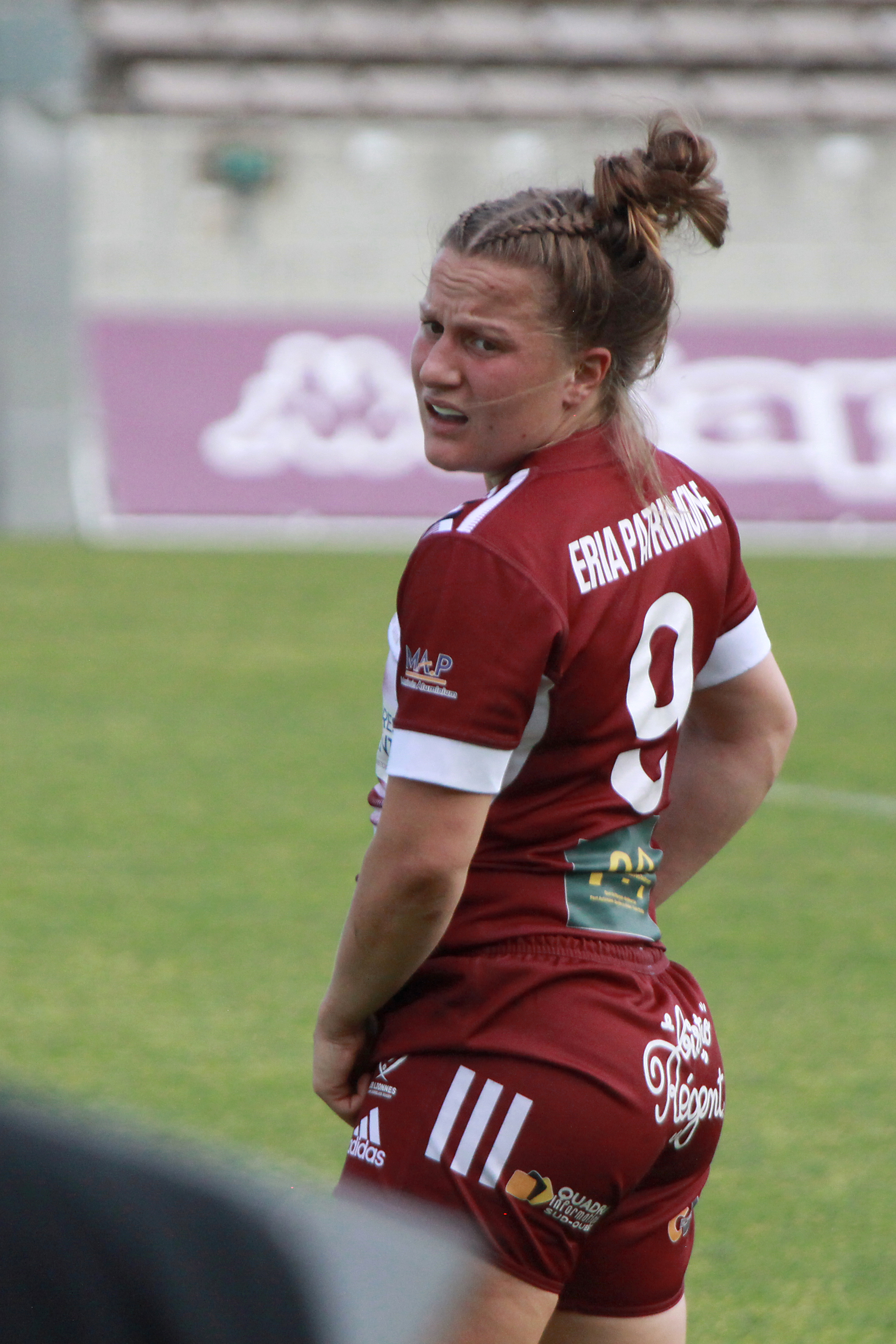
- Pelletier in 2022
- Born: 27 February 1996 (age 30) Rivière-du-Loup, Canada
- Height: 158 cm (5 ft 2 in)
- Weight: 65 kg (143 lb; 10 st 3 lb)

Rugby union career
- Position: Scrum-half
- Current team: Stade Bordelais
Senior career
Years	Team	Apps	(Points)
2014–2019	C.R.Q.	62	(0)
2020–2025	Stade Bordelais	54	(0)
International career
Years	Team	Apps	(Points)
2017–	Canada	43	(35)
- Correct as of 2025-09-27
Medal record
Women's rugby union
Representing Canada
World Cup
Silver medal – second place	2025 England	Team competition

Justine Pelletier (born 27 February 1996) is a Canadian rugby union player. She currently plays scrum-half for Stade bordelais in Elite 1 since 2020 and for Canada women's national team. She competed for Canada at the delayed 2021 Rugby World Cup.

== Rugby career ==
Pelletier was born in Rivière-du-Loup, Quebec. She studied kinesiology at Laval University. She used to play for the Club de Rugby de Québec located in Quebec city and for the Laval Rouge et Or where she won numerous accolades.

Pelletier won the U SPORTS Women's Rugby Championship with the Laval Rouge et Or rugby side in 2019 and reached the semi-final in 2022. She won the Élite 1 championship in 2023 with Stade bordelais.

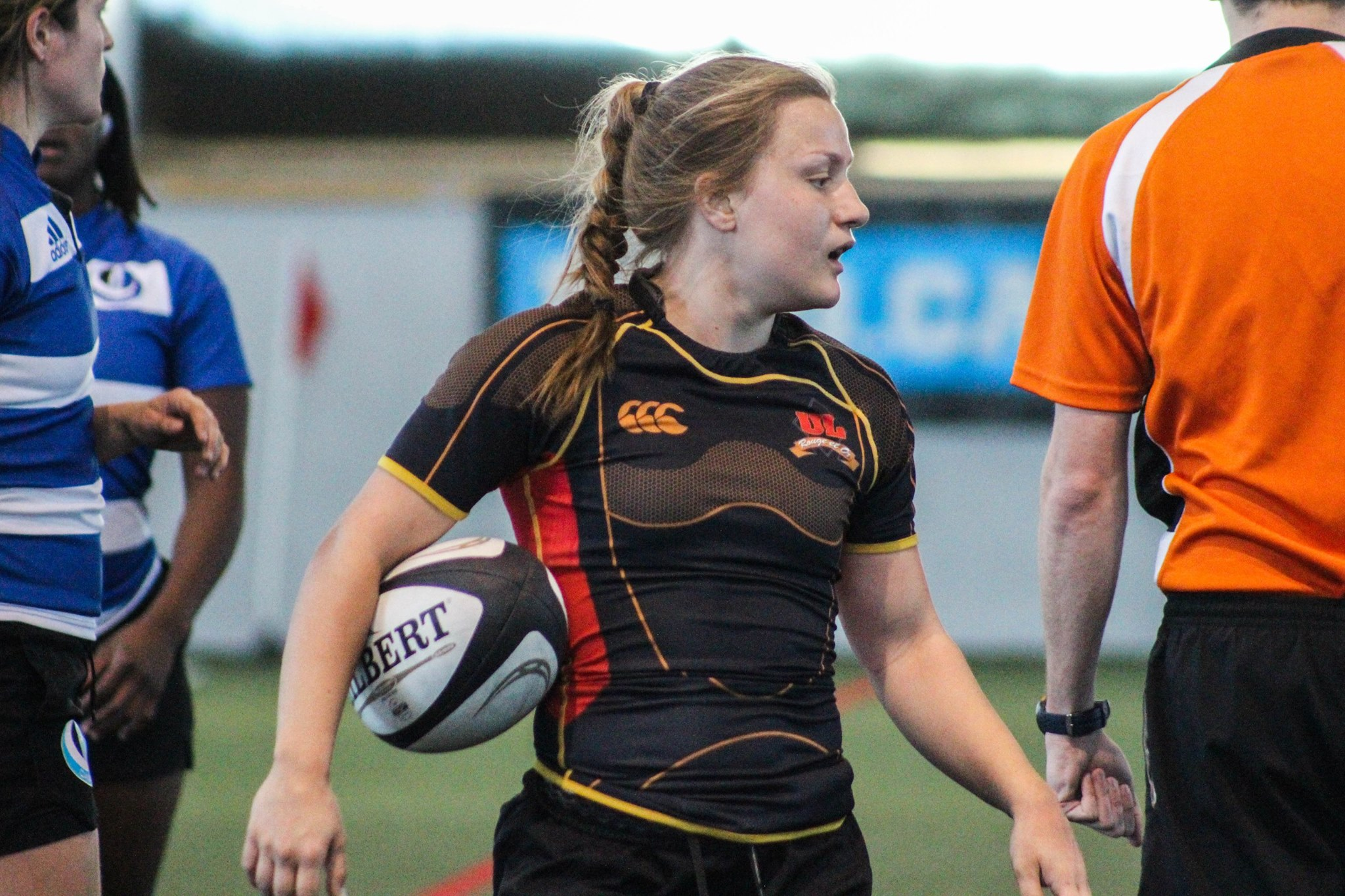
Justine Pelletier, Rouge & Or of Laval University

She competed for Canada at the delayed 2021 Rugby World Cup in New Zealand. She was in the starting line-up in all three matches of the knockout stage against the United States, England, and France. They reached the third place final before losing to France.

In 2023, She was named in Canada's traveling squad for their test against the Springbok women, and the Pacific Four Series. She started in Canada's 66–7 overwhelming of South Africa in Madrid, Spain.

In July 2023, she started in her sides Pacific Four loss to the Black Ferns, they went down 21–52.

She was selected in Canada's squad for the 2025 Pacific Four Series. In July 2025, she was named in Canada's Rugby World Cup squad.
