= Fabiola Forteza =

Canada international rugby union player (born 1995)

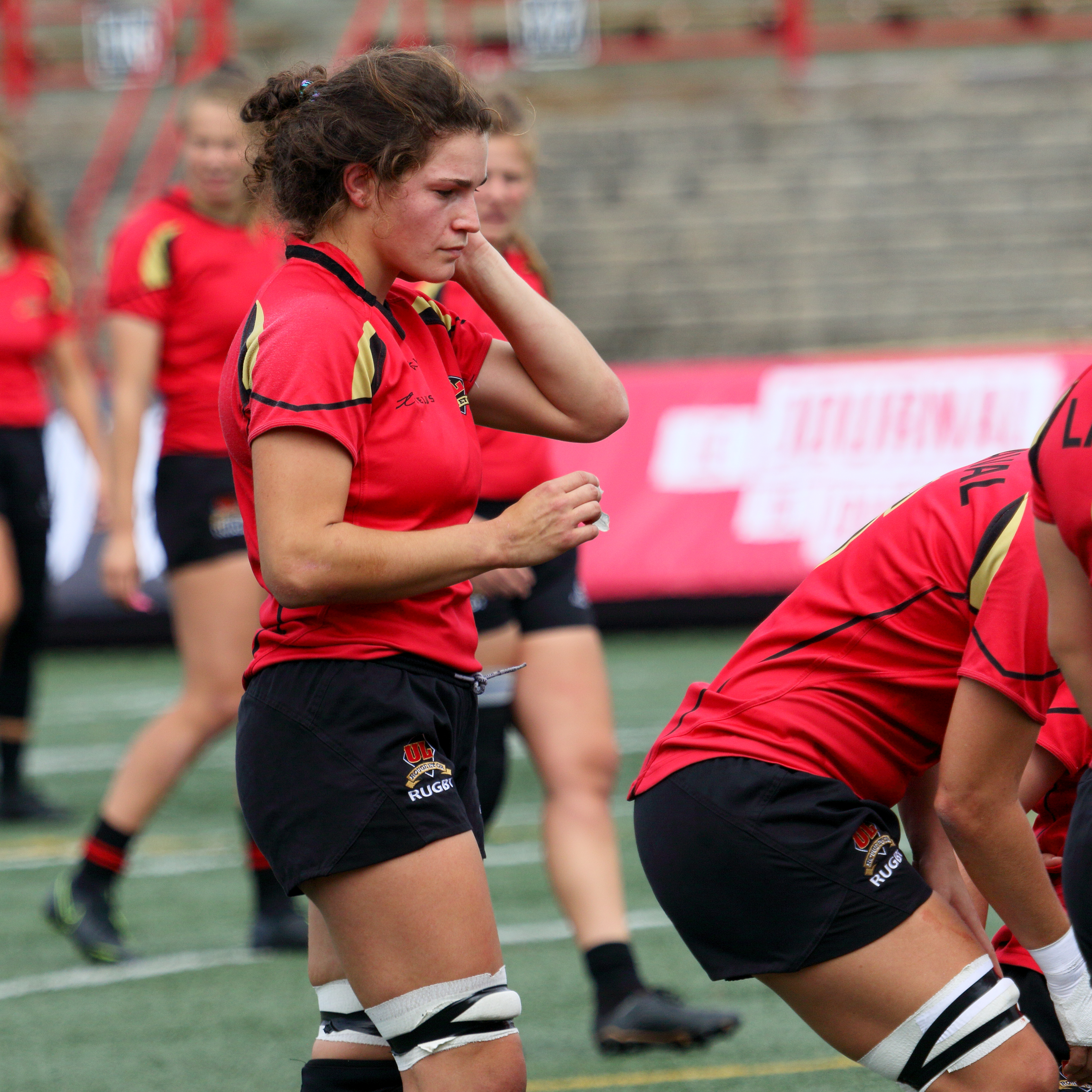
- Born: 4 August 1995 (age 31)
- Height: 1.73 m (5 ft 8 in)

Rugby union career
- Position: Back row
- Current team: Stade Bordelais
Senior career
Years	Team	Apps	(Points)
2020–	Stade Bordelais		(0)
International career
Years	Team	Apps	(Points)
2019–	Canada	41	(20)
Medal record
Women's rugby union
Representing Canada
World Cup
Silver medal – second place	2025 England	Team competition

Fabiola Forteza (born 4 August 1995) is a Canadian rugby union player. She competed for Canada at the delayed 2021 Rugby World Cup.

== Rugby career ==
Forteza competed for Canada at the delayed 2021 Rugby World Cup in New Zealand. She featured against the Eagles in the quarterfinals, against England in the semifinal, and in the third place final against France.

In 2023, she was named in Canada's squad for their test against the Springbok women and for the Pacific Four Series. She started in Canada's 66–7 thrashing of South Africa in Madrid, Spain. In the Pacific Series she scored a try in her sides 52–21 defeat to the Black Ferns at Ottawa.

She was selected in Canada's squad for the 2025 Pacific Four Series. In July, she was named in the Canadian side to the Rugby World Cup in England.
