= 2025 Women's Rugby World Cup =

Tenth edition of the Women's Rugby World Cup

Tournament details
- Host nation: England
- Dates: 22 August – 27 September 2025
- No. of nations: 16

Final positions
- Champions: England (3rd title)
- Runner-up: Canada
- Third place: New Zealand

Tournament statistics
- Matches played: 32
- Attendance: 441,395 (13,794 per match)
- Tries scored: 294 (average 9.19 per match)
- Top scorer(s): (New Zealand) Braxton Sorensen-McGee (69)
- Most tries: (New Zealand) Braxton Sorensen-McGee (11)
- Points scored: 1,879 (average 58.72 per match)

The 2025 Women's Rugby World Cup was the tenth edition of the Women's Rugby World Cup, the quadrennial world championship for national rugby union teams, organised by World Rugby. It was held in England between 22 August and 27 September 2025. The opening game took place at the Stadium of Light, while the final was held at Twickenham Stadium. The event returned to its traditional four-year cycle following the 2021 Women's Rugby World Cup (as Rugby World Cup), which was postponed until 2022 due to the COVID-19 pandemic. England won the competition, beating Canada 33–13 in the final.

It was the second Women's Rugby World Cup to be hosted by England, after the 2010 edition, and the fourth to be hosted in Great Britain. The tournament was expanded to 16 teams, from the previous 12 which participated in the 1991 and 1994 tournaments, and from 2006 to 2021. New Zealand entered the tournament as defending champions following their victory against England in the 2021 Rugby World Cup final. They were eliminated in the semi-finals by Canada, who became the first team to beat them at a World Cup in 11 years.

The tournament broke multiple records for women's rugby. A total of 444,465 tickets were sold across all 32 matches, three times the attendance of the previous Women's Rugby World Cup and the final at Twickenham Stadium drew an attendance of 81,885 spectators, a new world record for any women's rugby match. The tournament generated 147 million global viewing hours, a 336% increase on the previous edition, and yielded an estimated economic impact of £294.7 million for its eight host cities across England.

== Host selection ==
On 13 August 2020, World Rugby announced that the hosting rights to the next two men's and women's World Cups would be selected during the same process. These were the 2027 and 2031 men's tournaments and the 2025 and 2029 women's tournaments. The Rugby Football Union (RFU) confirmed their intent to bid for the 2025 tournament in October 2021. World Rugby awarded England preferred candidate status for the 2025 tournament in November 2021. England were confirmed as hosts on 13 May 2022.

== Venues ==
In August 2023, eight venues were confirmed for the event.

Twickenham	Sunderland	2025 Women's Rugby World Cup is located in England	Brighton and Hove	Bristol
Twickenham Stadium	Stadium of Light	2025 Women's Rugby World Cup is located in England	Brighton and Hove Albion Stadium	Ashton Gate
Capacity: 82,000	Capacity: 49,000	2025 Women's Rugby World Cup is located in England	Capacity: 31,876	Capacity: 26,462
Exeter	Northampton	2025 Women's Rugby World Cup is located in England	Salford	York
Sandy Park	Franklin's Gardens	2025 Women's Rugby World Cup is located in England	Salford Community Stadium	York Community Stadium
Capacity: 15,600	Capacity: 15,249	2025 Women's Rugby World Cup is located in England	Capacity: 11,404	Capacity: 8,500

In December 2023, it was announced that hosts England would open the tournament at the Stadium of Light in Sunderland, and that the final would be held at Twickenham Stadium in London. In June 2024, World Rugby confirmed that the quarter-finals would be shared between Sandy Park in Exeter and Ashton Gate in Bristol, while Ashton Gate would solely host the semi-finals.

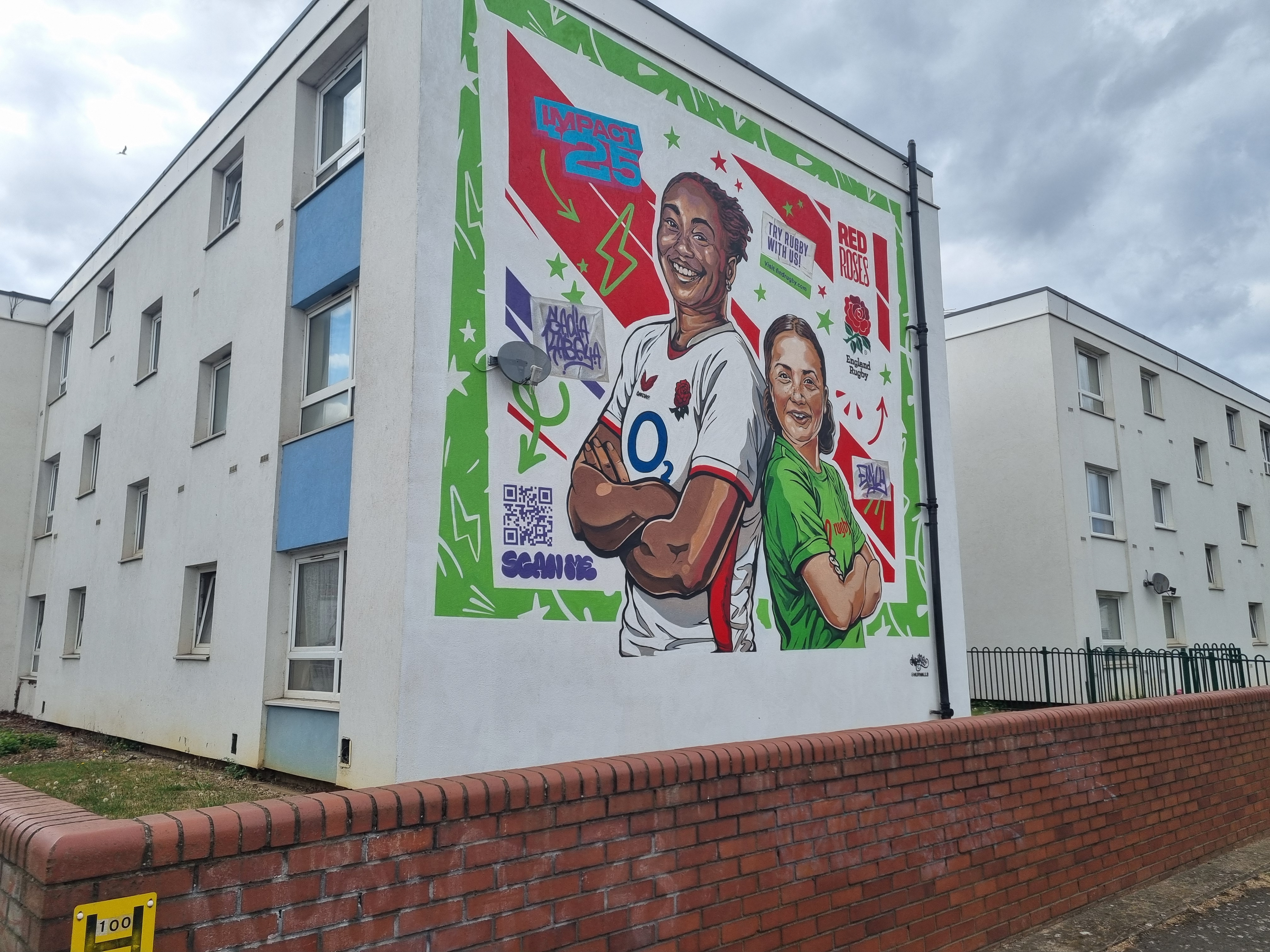
Mural commemorating the 2025 Women's Rugby World Cup in Northampton.

== Teams ==
=== Qualifying ===
Sixteen teams competed at the tournament. Four teams automatically qualified by reaching the 2021 Rugby World Cup semi-finals: New Zealand, England, France and Canada. Six of the remaining twelve spots were decided through the 2024 Women's Six Nations Championship, 2024 Pacific Four Series and regional competitions in Africa, Asia, Oceania, and South America, while the 2024 WXV determined the final six places.

In Europe, Ireland reached their eighth World Cup after taking the region's qualifying place by defeating Scotland in the final round of the 2024 Six Nations. In Africa, South Africa qualified for their fifth World Cup after beating Madagascar in the final round of the 2024 Rugby Africa Women's Cup. The United States made their tenth World Cup after New Zealand defeated Australia in the final game of the 2024 Pacific Four Series. In Asia, Japan qualified for their seventh World Cup after beating Kazakhstan in the second game of the 2024 Asia Rugby Women's Championship. Fiji qualified as Oceania 1 after winning the 2024 Oceania Rugby Women's Championship. Brazil qualified for their debut World Cup after beating Colombia in the South American qualifying, becoming the first South American team to qualify for the Women's Rugby World Cup.

In WXV 2, Australia, Italy, Scotland and Wales qualified for the World Cup. Samoa and Spain qualified as the top two teams in WXV 3 who had not already qualified via regional competitions.

Qualified teams
Region	Team	Qualification method	Previous apps	Previous best result	World Rugby Ranking (Note: Post warm-up matches)
Africa	South Africa	Africa 1	4	Tenth place (2010, 2014)	12
Asia	Japan	Asia 1	5	Eighth place (1994)	11
Europe	England	Hosts + Top 4 at 2021 RWC	9	Champions (1994, 2014)	1
Europe	France	Top 4 at 2021 RWC	9	Third place (seven times)	4
Europe	Ireland	Europe 1	7	Fourth place (2014)	5
Europe	Italy	2024 WXV 2 (3rd)	5	Quarter final (2021)	7
Europe	Scotland	2024 WXV 2 (2nd)	6	Fifth place (1994)	8
Europe	Wales	2024 WXV 2 (5th)	8	Fourth place (1994)	9
Europe	Spain	2024 WXV 3 (1st)	6	Sixth place (1991)	13
North America	Canada	Top 4 at 2021 RWC	9	Runners-up (2014)	2
North America	United States	P4 1	9	Champions (1991)	10
Oceania	Australia	2024 WXV 2 (1st)	7	Third place (2010)	6
Oceania	Fiji	Oceania 1	1	Pool stage (2021)	14
Oceania	New Zealand	Top 4 at 2021 RWC	8	Champions (six times)	3
Oceania	Samoa	2024 WXV 3 (2nd)	3	Ninth place (2002)	15
South America	Brazil	Americas 1	0	Debut	25

=== Squads ===
Each team could select 32 players for their squads. England head coach John Mitchell criticised this, saying that teams should have been allowed to select an additional player, as is permitted for teams competing in the Men's Rugby World Cup.

=== Draw ===
The pool draw took place on 17 October 2024, shown live on The One Show in the United Kingdom and on RugbyPassTV worldwide. Gabby Logan, Maggie Alphonsi and Roman Kemp, a presenter from The One Show, hosted the draw.

A seeding system was used for the draw, with all 16 allocated a seed based on their world rankings as of 14 October 2024. The top four teams in the world rankings were placed into band 1 and pre-populated into the first position in each pool. The 12 other teams were drawn into bands two, three, and four based on their rankings. The bands were:

- Band 1: Seeds 1 to 4
- Band 2: Seeds 5 to 8
- Band 3: Seeds 9 to 12
- Band 4: Seeds 13 to 16

This meant the 16 qualified teams, qualified were seeded thus (world ranking as of 14 October 2024):

Band 1
- England (1)
- Canada (2)
- New Zealand (3)
- France (4)
Band 2
- Australia (5)
- Ireland (6)
- Scotland (7)
- Italy (8)
Band 3
- United States (9)
- Wales (10)
- Japan (11)
- South Africa (12)
Band 4
- Spain (13)
- Samoa (15)
- Fiji (17)
- Brazil (42)

== Match officials ==
On 15 May 2025, World Rugby announced the team of 22 officials from 12 unions for the World Cup, including an all-female team of referees. Nine of the officials had served at the previous World Cup. English official Sara Cox served at her fifth World Cup, while Hollie Davidson was later appointed to referee the final, becoming the first referee to officiate two Women's Rugby World Cup finals.

Referees (10)

- Aimee Barrett-Theron (South Africa)
- Maggie Cogger-Orr (New Zealand)
- Sara Cox (England)
- Hollie Davidson (Scotland)
- Ella Goldsmith (Australia)
- Natarsha Ganley (New Zealand)
- Aurélie Groizeleau (France)
- Lauren Jenner (Italy)
- Clara Munarini (Italy)
- Kat Roche (United States)

Assistant referees (6)

- Maria Heitor (Portugal)
- Jess Ling (Australia)
- Amelia Luciano (United States)
- Precious Pazani (Zimbabwe)
- Amber Stamp-Dunstan (Wales)
- Holly Wood (England)

Television Match Officials (6)

- Leo Colgan (Ireland)
- Rachel Horton (Australia)
- Quinton Immelman (South Africa)
- Matteo Liperini (Italy)
- Andrew McMenemy (Scotland)
- Ian Tempest (England)

== Preparation ==
A series of warm up matches were played in the run-up to the tournament.

== Opening ceremony ==
Singer Anne-Marie headlined the opening ceremony at the Stadium of Light in Sunderland on 22 August 2025, before the opening match between England and the United States. This opening match saw the highest attendance of any in Women's Rugby World Cup history, with a crowd of 42,723.

== Pool stage ==
Competing countries were divided into four pools of four teams (pools A to D). Teams in each pool played one another in a round-robin format, with the top two teams advancing to the knockout stage.

Pool A	Pool B	Pool C	Pool D
England; Australia; United States; Samoa	Canada; Scotland; Wales; Fiji	New Zealand; Ireland; Japan; Spain	France; Italy; South Africa; Brazil

Points allocation in pool stage

- Four points are awarded for a win.
- Two points are awarded for a draw.
- A try bonus point is awarded to teams that score four or more tries in a match.
- A losing bonus point is awarded to teams that lose a match by seven points or fewer.

=== Pool A ===
Pos	Team	Pld	W	D	L	PF	PA	PD	TF	TA	TB	LB	Pts	
1	England (H)	3	3	0	0	208	17	+191	32	2	3	0	15	Advance to knockout stage
2	Australia	3	1	1	1	111	78	+33	17	12	2	0	8	Advance to knockout stage
3	United States	3	1	1	1	98	100	−2	16	16	2	0	8	
4	Samoa	3	0	0	3	3	225	−222	0	35	0	0	0	

Source: World Rugby
(H) Host

22 August 2025	England	69–7	United States	Stadium of Light, Sunderland
23 August 2025	Australia	73–0	Samoa	Salford Community Stadium, Salford
30 August 2025	England	92–3	Samoa	Franklin's Gardens, Northampton
30 August 2025	United States	31–31	Australia	York Community Stadium, York
6 September 2025	United States	60–0	Samoa	York Community Stadium, York
6 September 2025	England	47–7	Australia	Brighton & Hove Albion Stadium, Brighton

=== Pool B ===
Pos	Team	Pld	W	D	L	PF	PA	PD	TF	TA	TB	LB	Pts	
1	Canada	3	3	0	0	147	26	+121	23	4	3	0	15	Advance to knockout stage
2	Scotland	3	2	0	1	86	63	+23	14	10	2	0	10	Advance to knockout stage
3	Fiji	3	1	0	2	50	119	−69	8	21	1	0	5	
4	Wales	3	0	0	3	33	108	−75	6	16	1	1	2	

Source: World Rugby

23 August 2025	Scotland	38–8	Wales	Salford Community Stadium, Salford
23 August 2025	Canada	65–7	Fiji	York Community Stadium, York
30 August 2025	Canada	42–0	Wales	Salford Community Stadium, Salford
30 August 2025	Scotland	29–15	Fiji	Salford Community Stadium, Salford
6 September 2025	Canada	40–19	Scotland	Sandy Park, Exeter
6 September 2025	Wales	25–28	Fiji	Sandy Park, Exeter

=== Pool C ===
Pos	Team	Pld	W	D	L	PF	PA	PD	TF	TA	TB	LB	Pts	
1	New Zealand	3	3	0	0	156	27	+129	24	4	3	0	15	Advance to knockout stage
2	Ireland	3	2	0	1	85	81	+4	13	13	2	0	10	Advance to knockout stage
3	Japan	3	1	0	2	62	125	−63	10	19	1	0	5	
4	Spain	3	0	0	3	56	126	−70	9	20	1	0	1	

Source: World Rugby

24 August 2025	Ireland	42–14	Japan	Franklin's Gardens, Northampton
24 August 2025	New Zealand	54–8	Spain	York Community Stadium, York
31 August 2025	Ireland	43–27	Spain	Franklin's Gardens, Northampton
31 August 2025	New Zealand	62–19	Japan	Sandy Park, Exeter
7 September 2025	Japan	29–21	Spain	York Community Stadium, York
7 September 2025	New Zealand	40–0	Ireland	Brighton & Hove Albion Stadium, Brighton

=== Pool D ===
Pos	Team	Pld	W	D	L	PF	PA	PD	TF	TA	TB	LB	Pts	
1	France	3	3	0	0	165	15	+150	26	2	2	0	14	Advance to knockout stage
2	South Africa	3	2	0	1	105	87	+18	16	13	2	0	10	Advance to knockout stage
3	Italy	3	1	0	2	88	56	+32	16	8	2	1	7	
4	Brazil	3	0	0	3	14	214	−200	1	36	0	0	0	

Source: World Rugby

23 August 2025	France	24–0	Italy	Sandy Park, Exeter
24 August 2025	South Africa	66–6	Brazil	Franklin's Gardens, Northampton
31 August 2025	Italy	24–29	South Africa	York Community Stadium, York
31 August 2025	France	84–5	Brazil	Sandy Park, Exeter
7 September 2025	Italy	64–3	Brazil	Franklin's Gardens, Northampton
7 September 2025	France	57–10	South Africa	Franklin's Gardens, Northampton

== Knockout stage ==
The knockout stage consisted of three single-elimination rounds, culminating in a final and a third-place playoff. In the case of a tie in regulation time, two 10-minute periods of extra time would be played to determine a winner. If the scores are tied at the end of extra time, an additional 10-minute "sudden death" period would be played, with the first team to score any points being the winner. If the score still remains tied, a kicking competition would ensue.

Quarter-finals were split between Exeter's Sandy Park, and Bristol's Ashton Gate, while the latter hosted both semi-finals. The tournament concluded with a double-header of the Bronze Final and World Cup Final at Twickenham in London on 27 September 2025.

=== Bracket ===
Quarter-finals
13 September – Exeter
New Zealand	46
South Africa	17
13 September – Bristol
Canada	46
Australia	5
14 September – Exeter
France	18
Ireland	13
14 September – Bristol
England	40
Scotland	8

Semi-finals
19 September – Bristol
New Zealand	19
Canada	34
20 September – Bristol
France	17
England	35

Final
27 September – Twickenham
Canada	13
England	33
Bronze final
27 September – Twickenham
New Zealand	42
France	26

=== Quarter-finals ===
13 September 2025
13:00 BST (UTC+1)

New Zealand	46–17	South Africa
Try: Setefano 25' m Sorensen-McGee (2) 29' m, 44' m Holmes (2) 41' m, 65' c Olsen-Baker (2) 47' m, 54' c Vaha'akolo 80' c Con: Holmes (1/6) 55'; Sorensen-McGee (2/2) 66', 80+1'	Report	Try: Latsha 20' m Ngwevu 40+2' m Makua 76' c Con: Dolf (1/3) 77'

Sandy Park, Exeter
Attendance: 12,116
Referee: Sara Cox (England)

13 September 2025
16:00 BST (UTC+1)

Canada	46–5	Australia
Try: Hogan-Rochester 2' m Corrigan (2) 14' m, 20' c de Goede 17' c Hunt 38' c Forteza 50' c Paquin 77' m Con: de Goede (4/6) 18', 21', 40', 51'; Pen: Tessier (1/2) 72'	Report	Try: Miller 7' m

Ashton Gate, Bristol
Attendance: 16,571
Referee: Hollie Davidson (Scotland)

14 September 2025
13:00 BST (UTC+1)

France	18–13	Ireland
Try: Escudero 59' c Grisez 67' m Con: Bourgeois (1/2) 60'; Pen: Bourgeois (2/2) 48', 76'	Report	Try: Djougang 6' m Flood 24' m Pen: O'Brien (1/1) 38'

Sandy Park, Exeter
Attendance: 11,618
Referee: Aimee Barrett-Theron (South Africa)

14 September 2025
16:00 BST (UTC+1)

England	40–8	Scotland
Try: Clifford (2) 12' c, 40' c Talling 15' c Dow 31' m Cokayne 46' c Aitchison 64' c Con: Aitchison (5/6) 13', 16', 40+1', 47', 65'	Report	Try: Lloyd 80+2' m Pen: Nelson (1/1) 4'

Ashton Gate, Bristol
Attendance: 25,295
Referee: Aurélie Groizeleau (France)

=== Semi-finals ===
19 September 2025
19:00 BST (UTC+1)

New Zealand	19–34	Canada
Try: Kalounivale 26' c Mikaele-Tu'u 56' c Sorensen-McGee 65' m Con: Holmes (1/1) 27'; Sorensen-McGee (1/2) 57'	Report	Try: Pelletier 8' c Hogan-Rochester 11' m Symonds 24' m de Goede 35' c Tessier 43' c Con: de Goede (3/5) 9', 36', 44'; Pen: de Goede (1/1) 74'

Ashton Gate, Bristol
Attendance: 24,592
Referee: Aimee Barrett-Theron (South Africa)

20 September 2025
15:30 BST (UTC+1)

France	17–35	England
Try: Konde (2) 24' m, 73' m Arbey 52' c Con: Bourgeois (1/3) 53'	Report	Try: Kildunne (2) 5' c, 69' c Cokayne 46' c Ward 59' c Jones 79' c Con: Harrison (5/5) 6', 47', 60', 70', 80'

Ashton Gate, Bristol
Attendance: 25,478
Referee: Maggie Cogger-Orr (New Zealand)

=== Bronze final ===
27 September 2025
12:30 BST (UTC+1)

New Zealand	42–26	France
Try: Demant 14' c Brunt 32' c Holmes 37' c Bayfield 40' m Sorensen-McGee (2) 46' m, 60' m Con: Holmes (3/6) 15', 33', 38'; Pen: Holmes (2/2) 55', 80'	Report	Try: Bourdon Sansus 10' c Champon 62' c Vernier 66' c Boulard 72' m Con: Arbez (1/1) 11'; Tuy (2/3) 63', 67'

Twickenham Stadium, London
Attendance: 50,000
Referee: Ella Goldsmith (Australia)

=== Final ===
27 September 2025
16:00 BST (UTC+1)

Canada	13–33	England
Try: Hogan-Rochester (2) 5' m, 53' m Pen: de Goede (1/1) 34'	Report	Try: Kildunne 8' c Cokayne 19' c Matthews (2) 26' c, 69' c Ward 50' m Con: Harrison (4/5) 9', 20', 27', 70'

Twickenham Stadium, London
Attendance: 81,885
Referee: Hollie Davidson (Scotland)

== Statistics ==
=== Points scorers ===
As of 27 September 2025

Pos	Name	Team	T	C	P	DG	Pts
1	Braxton Sorensen-McGee	New Zealand	11	7	0	0	69
2	Renee Holmes	New Zealand	4	19	2	0	64
3	Sophie de Goede	Canada	3	20	2	0	61
4	Zoe Harrison	England	0	21	0	0	42
5	Jess Breach	England	6	0	0	0	30
5	Francesca McGhie	Scotland	6	0	0	0	30
5	Desiree Miller	Australia	6	0	0	0	30
5	Julia Schell	Canada	6	0	0	0	30
5	Freda Tafuna	United States	6	0	0	0	30
10	Morgane Bourgeois	France	0	9	3	0	27
10	Byrhandré Dolf	South Africa	0	12	1	0	27
10	Helena Rowland	England	1	11	0	0	27

=== Try scorers ===
As of 27 September 2025

Pos	Name	Team	Tries
1	Braxton Sorensen-McGee	New Zealand	11
2	Jess Breach	England	6
2	Francesca McGhie	Scotland	6
2	Desiree Miller	Australia	6
2	Julia Schell	Canada	6
2	Freda Tafuna	United States	6
7	Émilie Boulard	France	5
7	Kelsey Clifford	England	5
7	Asia Hogan-Rochester	Canada	5
7	Ellie Kildunne	England	5

== Broadcasting rights ==
The tournament generated 147 million global viewing hours, a 336% increase on the previous Women's Rugby World Cup, making it the most-watched women's rugby tournament ever staged. In the United Kingdom, the BBC held exclusive broadcast rights, covering every match on BBC iPlayer and the BBC Sport website and app, with home nations fixtures and all knockout matches also shown on BBC One or BBC Two.

The opening match between England and the United States drew a peak UK audience of 2.4 million on BBC One, with a further 600,000 watching on iPlayer, surpassing the total audience for the entire 2021 tournament in a single weekend. The final between England and Canada achieved a record peak UK audience of 5.8 million viewers across BBC linear and streaming platforms, making it the most-watched women's rugby match and the most-watched rugby match of any kind in the United Kingdom in 2025. Across the full tournament, BBC audiences watched 57 million hours of coverage, with 10.5 million digital streams on iPlayer and BBC Sport.

In France, broadcaster TF1's coverage of the semi-final between France and England reached a peak of 4.4 million viewers. Globally, 15 countries broadcast all 32 matches, with viewing hour increases of 470% in Europe, 403% Africa and the Middle East, and 217% in the Americas compared with the previous edition.

=== Broadcasting rights ===
Territory	Rights holder	Ref
Australia	Nine Network; Stan Sport	
Austria	ProSieben	
Canada	TSN; RDS	
Czechia	Nova; Pro TV	
Fiji	Fiji Television	
France	TF1; France Télévisions	
Georgia	Georgian Public Broadcaster	
Germany	ProSieben	
Ireland	RTÉ; TG4	
Italy	RAI	
Japan	J Sports	
Middle East and North Africa	Starz	
Netherlands	Ziggo	
New Zealand	Sky New Zealand	
Portugal	Sport TV	
Romania	Nova; Pro TV	
Slovakia	Nova; Pro TV	
South and Central America	ESPN; Disney+	
Southeast Asia	beIN Sports	
Spain	Teledeporte; Movistar +	
Sub-Saharan Africa	SuperSport	
Switzerland	ProSieben	
Taiwan	ELTA	
United Kingdom	BBC (Note: Select games shown on linear channels, all games to be shown on BBC iPlayer.)	
United States	CBS Sports; Paramount+	
Rest of the world	RugbyPass TV	

== Attendance and impact ==
The 2025 Women's Rugby World Cup broke multiple records, prompting World Rugby chief executive Alan Gilpin to describe it as the greatest Rugby World Cup of all time.

=== Attendance ===
A total of 444,465 tickets were sold across 32 matches, 92% of all available tickets and more than three times sold at the previous Women's Rugby World Cup held in New Zealand. Supporters travelled from 133 countries to attend matches and 53% of supporters were women.

The opening match between England and the United States at the Stadium of Light drew 42,723 spectators, at that point a new record for a Women's Rugby World Cup match. The final at Twickenham attracted 81,885 fans, the largest crowd in the history of women's rugby and the second-highest attendance for any Rugby World Cup final across the men's and women's game, surpassed only by the 2003 Rugby World Cup final (82,957). When England last hosted the Women's Rugby World Cup in 2010, the final at the Twickenham Stoop had drawn a crowd of only 13,253.

=== Economic impact ===
World Rugby published the Women's Rugby World Cup 2025 Impact Report and the Impact Beyond 2025 Global Impact Report, which together documented the tournament's domestic and international legacy. The tournament generated an estimated £294.7 million in economic impact for its eight host cities. Direct expenditure totalled £176.3 million, including £41.4 million for the UK accommodation sector and £24 million for the hospitality sector.

== Marketing ==
=== Sponsorship ===
Principal partners	Official partners	Official suppliers and supporters
Arthur J. Gallagher & Co.; Asahi Breweries; Capgemini; Defender; Mastercard	ChildFund Rugby; Emirates; HSBC; Mitsubishi Electric; O2	Aggreko; Allianz; Allwyn Entertainment; Gilbert Rugby; Kettle Foods; Macron; Ocean Outdoor; One Stop; Perform Better; SharkNinja; Ticketmaster; Unilever; Volvic; Wilkinson Sword
