= 2018–19 Élite 1 season =

French women's rugby union league season

- Countries: France
- Date: 16 September 2018–19 May 2019
- Champions: Montpellier (8th title)
- Runners-up: Toulouse
- Relegated: SO Villelonguet; Stado Tarbes-Pyrénées

Official website
- www.ffr.fr

The 2018–2019 Élite 1 season was the 48th edition of the competition and featured 16 teams.

Montpellier HR defeated Stade Toulousain in the final and were crowned champions. SO Villelonguet and Stado Tarbes Pyrénées were relegated to Élite 2 at the end of the season.

== Participants ==
For the 2018–2019 season, Elite 1 was structured as follows:

- The 8 clubs of the Elite 1 Top 8 championship 2017–2018.
- The top 8 clubs of Elite 2 2017–2018.

| Club | 2017–18 Ranking | Coach | Stadium |
|---|---|---|---|
| AS Bayonne | 6th | (France) Jean-Matthieu Alcalde (France) Samuel Dylbaitys (France) Vincent Corret | Stade Pierre-Cacareigt |
| Blagnac SCR | 4th | (France) Nicolas Tranier (France) Jean Lassere (France) Laurent Tranier | Stade Ernest-Argelès |
| AC Bobigny | 7th | (France) Alexandre Gau | Stade Henri-Wallon |
| Stade Bordelais | 2nd (Elite 2, Group 2) | (France) Clément Millet (France) Florent Torregaray | Stade Chaban-Delmas |
| Ovalie Caennaise | 3rd (Elite 2, Group 2) | (France) Gilles Rabier (France) Jean-François Mouton | Stade Hélitas |
| FC Grenoble Amazones | 1st (Elite 2, Group 1, Champion) | (France) Emmanuel Pellorce (Portugal) Cristian Spachuk | Stade Jean-Julien |
| Stade Villeneuvois LM | 2nd | (France) Frédéric Cocqu (France) Cyril Fouda | Terrain Emmanuel Théry; Stadium Lille Métropole |
| Lons Section Paloise | 1st (Elite 2, Group 2) | (France) Christophe Barraqué (France) Laurent Vitalla | Stade du Bourg (Complexe Georges Martin) |
| Montpellier HR | 1st (Champion) | (France) Patrick Raffy (France) Olivier Clessienne | Stade Sabathé |
| Stade Français | 2nd (Elite 2, Group 1) | (France) Olivier Carreiras (France) Anaïs Lagougine | Stade René-Leduc |
| Stade Rennais | 5th | (France) Vincent Brehonnet (France) Anne Berville | Stade du Commandant Bougouin |
| ASM Rugby | 8th | (France) Fabrice Ribeyrolles (France) Vincent Fargeas | Stade Michel-Brun |
| ASRUC Rugby | 4th (Elite 2, Group 1) | (France) Cyrille Lloza | Stade de l'ASRUC |
| Stado Tarbes Pyrénées | 4th (Elite 2, Group 2) | (France) Thierry Escoubas (France) Laurent Abadie (France) Philippe Mallet | |
| Stade Toulousain | 3rd | (France) Anthony Granja (France) Pascal Belaubre | Stade Ernest-Wallon |
| SO Villelonguet | 3rd (Elite 2, Group 2) | (France) Pierre Vergés (France) Jean-Marie Faveaux | Stade Joseph-Raynal |

== Regular season ==
=== Format ===
The competition consists of two groups of eight teams, established based on their rankings in the 2017–2018 seasons of the Elite 1 Top 8 and Elite 2 Armelle Auclair competitions, with matches played home and away. The championship was interrupted by a long winter break, which lasted from 17 December 2018 to 23 March 2019, apart from a few postponed matches played in mid-January. During this period, the international players participated in the 2019 Women's Six Nations Tournament while the clubs competed in the French Women's Rugby 10s Cup.

=== Regular season standings ===
==== Pool 1 ====
| Rank | Club | P | W | D | L | PF | PA | PD | Pts |
|---|---|---|---|---|---|---|---|---|---|
| 1 | Montpellier HR | 14 | 14 | 0 | 0 | 754 | 94 | +660 | 69 |
| 2 | Blagnac SCR | 14 | 12 | 0 | 2 | 488 | 174 | +314 | 56 |
| 3 | ASM Rugby | 14 | 8 | 1 | 5 | 293 | 177 | +116 | 41 |
| 4 | Stade Rennais | 14 | 8 | 0 | 6 | 386 | 281 | +105 | 39 |
| 5 | Stade Français | 14 | 7 | 1 | 6 | 217 | 294 | -77 | 34 |
| 6 | Lons Section Paloise | 14 | 3 | 1 | 10 | 195 | 343 | -148 | 18 |
| 7 | ASRUC Rugby | 14 | 1 | 1 | 12 | 126 | 649 | -523 | 6 |
| 8 | SO Villelonguet | 14 | 1 | 0 | 13 | 91 | 563 | -472 | 2 |

==== Pool 2 ====
| Rank | Club | P | W | D | L | PF | PA | PD | Pts |
|---|---|---|---|---|---|---|---|---|---|
| 1 | Stade Toulousain | 14 | 13 | 0 | 1 | 602 | 65 | +537 | 64 |
| 2 | AS Bayonne | 14 | 12 | 0 | 2 | 518 | 200 | +318 | 56 |
| 3 | AC Bobigny | 14 | 10 | 0 | 4 | 415 | 198 | +217 | 47 |
| 4 | FC Grenoble Amazones | 14 | 7 | 0 | 7 | 221 | 290 | -69 | 32 |
| 5 | Stade Villeneuvois LM | 14 | 6 | 0 | 8 | 195 | 271 | -76 | 29 |
| 6 | Stade Bordelais | 14 | 5 | 0 | 9 | 182 | 312 | -130 | 26 |
| 7 | Ovalie Caennaise | 14 | 2 | 0 | 12 | 105 | 509 | -404 | 10 |
| 8 | Stado Tarbes Pyrénées | 14 | 1 | 0 | 13 | 87 | 480 | -393 | 5 |

== Final phase ==
- The top 4 ranked teams in each group qualify for the quarter-finals.
- Each quarter-final will take place on the home ground of the team with the highest ranking at the end of the qualifying phase. The semi-finals and the final will be played on neutral ground, with the winner of the final being crowned French Champion.

=== Bracket ===
Quarter-finals
4 May 2019 – Stade Éric Béchu
Montpellier HR | 51
FC Grenoble Amazones | 7
4 May 2019 – Stade Pierre-Cacareigt
AS Bayonne | 21
ASM Rugby | 15
4 May 2019 – Stade Ernest-Wallon
Stade Toulousain | 22
Stade Rennais | 10
4 May 2019 – Stade Ernest-Argelès
Blagnac SCR | 20
AC Bobigny | 18

Semi-finals
11 May 2019 – Stade Jacques-Fouroux
Montpellier HR | 40
AS Bayonne | 12
11 May 2019 – Stade Jacques-Fouroux
Stade Toulousain | 30
Blagnac SCR | 15

Final
18 May 2019 – Stade Maurice Trélut
Montpellier HR | 22
Stade Toulousain | 13

=== Semi-finals ===
| 11 May 2019 | Stade Toulousain | 30–15 | Blagnac SCR | Stade Jacques-Fouroux |
| 12:15 PM | | | | Referee: Pierre Bru |

| 11 May 2019 | Montpellier HR | 40–12 | AS Bayonne | Stade Jacques-Fouroux |
| 2:15 PM | | | | Referee: Yannick Vals |

=== Final ===
| 18 May 2019 | Montpellier HR | 22–13 | Stade Toulousain | Stade Maurice Trélut |
| 9 PM | | | | Referee: Hervé Lasausa |

== Relegation phase ==
- The bottom four teams in each group compete in the relegation phase.
- The relegation/play-off matches first and second are played at the home ground of the higher-ranked team from the qualifying phase. The four losing teams from the first round of relegation/play-offs compete in a second round to try to avoid relegation from Elite 1 Féminine. The two losing teams are relegated to Elite 2 Féminine.

=== Round 1 ===
Following SO Villelonguet's withdrawal from the remainder of the season, only half of the relegation playoff matches were played. The teams from Lille, Lons, and Caen automatically secured their place in Elite 1.

| 5 May 2019 | Stade Français | 56–5 | Stado Tarbes Pyrénées | Stade René-Leduc |
| 2 PM | | | | Referee: Sylvain Desvaux |

| 5 May 2019 | Stade Bordelais | 17–20 | ASRUC Rugby | Stade Chaban-Delmas |
| 2 PM | | | | Referee: Thibault Santamaria |

=== Round 2 ===
| 12 May 2019 | Stade Bordelais | 25–5 | Stado Tarbes Pyrénées | Stade Sainte-Germaine |
| 3 PM | | | | Referee: Fabrice Alejo |
