= 2019–20 Élite 2 season =

French rugby union season

- Countries: France
- Number of teams: 9
- Date: 21 September 2019 – 1 March 2020
- Champions: Title not awarded
- Runners-up: RC Chilly-Mazarin
- Promoted: RC La Valette Le Revest La Garde Le Pradet
- Relegated: Montpellier (reserve team); Stade Toulousain (reserve team)

Official website
- www.ffr.fr

The 2019–20 Élite 2 season took place from 21 September 2019 to 1 March 2020. The season was interrupted from mid-March following the spread of the COVID-19 pandemic in France. The championship did not resume and the French 2nd division championship title was not awarded in 2020.

No teams were promoted or relegated at the end of the season. As planned before the suspension of the championship, the two reserve teams of Montpellier RC and Stade Toulousain, were relegated to Fédérale 1 for the 2020–21 season to ensure a two-division gap with their first team. Nanterre, meanwhile, was relegated following a general forfeit. Furthermore, RC La Valette Le Revest La Garde Le Pradet, top of the table after the season was halted, was promoted to Elite 1 after Ovalie Caennaise was relegated at its own request.

== Format ==
The competition takes place in the form of a single group of 10 teams in "home and away" matches.

- The clubs ranked in 1st and 2nd place qualify for the final.
- Clubs finishing 9th and 10th in the qualifying phase are normally relegated to Fédérale 1. From 2020 onwards, first and reserve teams must be separated by at least two divisions. The reserve teams of Montpellier RC and Stade Toulousain were therefore automatically relegated to Fédérale 1 for the 2020–2021 season.

Following the withdrawal of Racing Nanterre Rugby, the pool now consists of nine teams.

== Participants ==
Teams competing in the 2019–20 Elite 2 season are as follows:

| Teams | Note |
|---|---|
| Stado Tarbes Pyrénées rugby | Team relegated following the 2018–19 Elite 1 season. |
| Stade Rochelais | Teams from the 2018–19 Elite 2 season that did not qualify for the final |
| RC La Valette Le Revest La Garde Le Pradet | Teams from the 2018–19 Elite 2 season that did not qualify for the final |
| RC Narbonne | Teams from the 2018–19 Elite 2 season that did not qualify for the final |
| USA Limoges | Teams from the 2018–19 Elite 2 season that did not qualify for the final |
| Entente Bruges Blanquefort | Teams from the 2018–19 Elite 2 season that did not qualify for the final |
| USAP Women's XV Roussillon | Teams from the 2018–19 Elite 2 season that did not qualify for the final |
| Racing Nanterre Rugby | Teams from the 2018–19 Elite 2 season that did not qualify for the final |
| Montpellier RC (reserve team) | Teams promoted following the 2018–19 Fédérale 1 season. |
| Stade Toulousain (reserve team) | Teams promoted following the 2018–19 Fédérale 1 season. |

- Racing Nanterre Rugby was reinstated following the withdrawal of SO Villelonguet who were relegated from Elite 1. Racing Nanterre, were faced with a lack of players and were unable to form two teams, they later withdrew their team before the start of the championship and were not replaced.

== Regular season standings ==
| Rank | Club | GP | W | D | L | OB | DB | PF | PA | Diff | Points |
|---|---|---|---|---|---|---|---|---|---|---|---|
| 1 | RC La Valette Le Revest La Garde Le Pradet | 11 | 9 | 1 | 1 | 3 | 0 | 193 | 75 | +118 | 41 |
| 2 | USA Limoges | 12 | 9 | 0 | 3 | 4 | 1 | 255 | 119 | +136 | 41 |
| 3 | Stade Rochelais | 11 | 7 | 1 | 3 | 5 | 2 | 219 | 76 | +143 | 37 |
| 4 | Montpellier RC (reserve team) (P) | 12 | 7 | 0 | 5 | 2 | 1 | 207 | 161 | +46 | 31 |
| 5 | RC Narbonne | 11 | 6 | 0 | 5 | 4 | 2 | 181 | 139 | +42 | 30 |
| 6 | Stade Toulousain (reserve team) (R) | 11 | 5 | 0 | 6 | 2 | 2 | 189 | 130 | +59 | 24 |
| 7 | USAP XV | 12 | 4 | 0 | 8 | 2 | 3 | 100 | 164 | –64 | 21 |
| 8 | ES Bruges Blanquefort | 12 | 4 | 0 | 8 | 1 | 1 | 151 | 317 | –166 | 18 |
| 9 | Stado Tarbes Pyrénées | 12 | 0 | 0 | 12 | 0 | 1 | 87 | 401 | –314 | –1 |
| 10 | Racing Nanterre Rugby | 0 | 0 | 0 | 0 | 0 | 0 | 0 | 0 | 0 | 0 |

| Promoted to Elite 1 |
| Relegated to Fédérale 1 |
| Withdrew |
| R : relegated 2019 • P : promoted 2019 |
