= Supersevens =

Rugby sevens tournament in France

- Sport: Rugby sevens
- Founded: 2019; 7 years ago
- Administrator: National Rugby League (LNR)
- No. of teams: 16 (men); 12 (women)
- Country: France; Monaco
- Most recent champions: Union Bordeaux Bègles (1st title) (Men); Lyon OU (1st title) (Women)
- Most titles: French Barbarians (3 titles)
- Broadcasters: Canal+ Canal+ Sport
- Sponsor: In Extenso (title sponsor)
- Level on pyramid: Professional
- Website: supersevens.lnr.fr

The Supersevens is a professional rugby sevens competition organised by the Ligue nationale de rugby (LNR) since 2020. It is the first professional rugby sevens tournament ever held in France. For sponsorship reasons, the competition has been officially known as the In Extenso Supersevens since its inception in 2020.

Following rugby sevens’ inclusion in the 2016 Rio Olympic Games, French rugby authorities announced their goal of developing the sport domestically and enhancing its competitiveness and popularity. Eight years later, the French men's national sevens team captured the Olympic title at the 2024 Paris Games.

== History ==
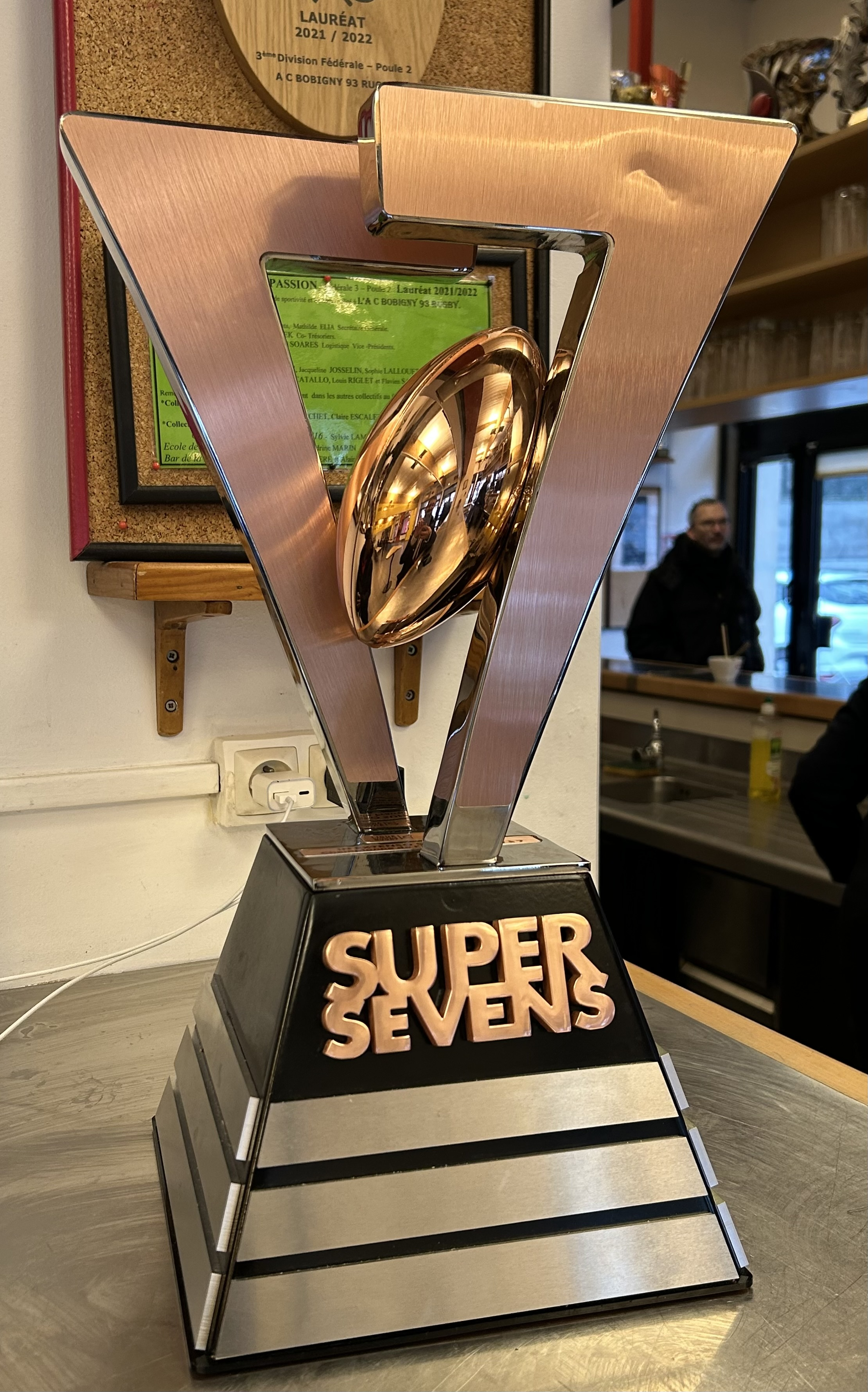
The Supersevens trophy, here won by AC Bobigny in the 2024 women's edition.

Beginning with the 2019–20 season, the LNR established the Supersevens, the first professional rugby sevens competition in France. Sixteen teams participate:

- 14 clubs from the Top 14,
- One team from the Monaco principality,
- One invited side.

Each squad consists of 20 players. Clubs must select at least fifteen players from their own rosters, including a minimum of three professionals, and may recruit up to four additional players — either members of the France Sevens setup, Pro D2 or Fédérale 1 clubs from the same regional league, or short-term signees such as unattached players or international sevens specialists.

The Monaco team, the Monaco Rugby Sevens, was created as an association for the inaugural edition by former France international Frédéric Michalak.

In September 2019, the LNR announced that the French Barbarians would serve as the invited team from 2020 through 2023, featuring players from Pro D2, Fédérale 1, and foreign federations.

The first edition, held as a one-day event at Paris La Défense Arena, was won by Racing 92, becoming the first professional French rugby sevens champion. The 2020 season was cancelled due to the COVID-19 pandemic, but the competition resumed in 2021 with a new format including three preliminary stages and a grand final.

== Competition format ==
The inaugural 2019–20 edition took place as a single tournament on 1 at Paris La Défense Arena, with Racing 92 crowned champion. The second season was initially scheduled to include summer stages before the COVID-19 pandemic in France forced its cancellation. The 2020–21 edition was also cancelled.

From 2021 onward, the competition has been staged over three consecutive weekends in August, prior to the start of the Top 14 season. Sixteen teams compete in a knockout format beginning with the round of 16. The winner of each stage qualifies directly for the final stage in November, which features the eight best-performing teams from the qualifiers.

For the 2026 season, the format was revised to include two summer stages, ensuring parity between the men's and women's tournaments: while the men's series loses one round, the women's circuit gains an additional event.

== Champions ==
=== Men’s winners ===
Season	Stages	Final venue	Winner	Runner-up	Third place
2020	1	Paris La Défense Arena, Nanterre	Racing 92	Section Paloise	RC Toulon
2021	4	Paris La Défense Arena, Nanterre	French Barbarians	Monaco Rugby Sevens	Racing 92
2022	4	Paris La Défense Arena, Nanterre	Monaco Rugby Sevens	Section Paloise	Racing 92
2023	4	Paris La Défense Arena, Nanterre	French Barbarians	Section Paloise	ASM Clermont Auvergne
2024	4	Paris La Défense Arena, Nanterre	French Barbarians	Section Paloise	Union Bordeaux Bègles
2025	4	Paris La Défense Arena, Nanterre	Union Bordeaux Bègles	Monaco Rugby Sevens	French Barbarians

=== Women’s winners ===
Season	Stages	Final venue	Winner	Runner-up	Third place
2024	4	Paris La Défense Arena, Nanterre	AC Bobigny	ASM Romagnat	Lyon OU
2025	2	Paris La Défense Arena, Nanterre	Lyon OU	AC Bobigny	ASM Romagnat

== Media and sponsorship ==
=== Broadcasting ===
In 2019, Canal+ acquired the broadcast rights for the competition — along with the Pro D2 — for seven seasons, covering 2020 to 2027, including the initial 2019–20 event.

=== Title sponsor ===
On 25, the LNR announced that the competition would be officially named the In Extenso Supersevens under a title sponsorship agreement with In Extenso, a national accounting and business services firm for SMEs and small enterprises. The partnership was renewed in 2025 through the 2030–31 season.
