= 2018–19 Élite 2 season =

French rugby union season

- Countries: France
- Number of teams: 10
- Date: 23 September 2018 – 19 May 2019
- Champions: Lyon OUR (1st title)
- Runners-up: RC Chilly-Mazarin
- Promoted: Lyon OUR; RC Chilly-Mazarin
- Relegated: Racing Nanterre Rugby; AS Béziers Hérault

Official website
- www.ffr.fr

The 2018–19 Élite 2 season commenced on 23 September 2018 and concluded on 19 May 2019.

Lyon OUR defeated RC Chilly-Mazarin in the final to be crowned champions, and both teams were promoted to the Elite 1 championship for the following season.

== Format ==
The competition takes place in the form of a single group of 10 teams in "home and away" matches.

- The clubs ranked 1st and 2nd are promoted to Elite 1.
- The clubs ranked 9th and 10th at the end of the qualifying phase are relegated to Fédérale 1.

== Participants ==
For the 2018–19 Elite 2 season, the following ten teams took part in the tournament:

- Seven teams from the 2017–2018 Elite 2 championship that did not qualify for the round of 16:
  - RC Chilly-Mazarin
  - Lyon OUR
  - Racing Nanterre Rugby
  - RC Narbonne Méditerranée
  - USAP Women's XV Roussillon
  - Stade Rochelais
  - RC La Valette Le Revest La Garde Le Pradet
- Three teams that were promoted from the 2017–2018 Fédérale 1 league:
  - AS Béziers Hérault
  - Entente Bruges Blanquefort
  - USA Limoges

== Regular season standings ==
Rank	Club	GP	W	D	L	OB	DB	PF	PA	Diff	Points
1	Lyon OUR	18	15	0	3	15	2	648	97	+551	77
2	RC Chilly-Mazarin	18	15	0	3	9	1	440	155	+285	70
3	Stade Rochelais	18	14	1	3	9	1	476	139	+337	68
4	RC La Valette Le Revest La Garde Le Pradet	18	11	0	7	3	2	280	226	+54	49
5	RC Narbonne Méditerranée	18	10	0	8	5	2	257	239	+18	47
6	USA Limoges	18	9	2	7	5	0	381	312	+69	45
7	ES Bruges Blanquefort	18	8	0	10	5	2	331	328	+3	39
8	USAP Women's XV	18	2	1	15	1	2	140	599	-459	13
9	Racing Nanterre Rugby	18	2	0	16	0	3	78	534	-456	11
10	AS Béziers Hérault	18	2	0	16	0	3	99	501	-402	11

== Final ==
19 May 2019
5:30 PM

Lyon OUR	22–8	RC Chilly-Mazarin

Stade Maurice Trélut, Tarbes.
Referee: Aurélie Groizeleau
