= 2020–21 Élite 2 season =

French rugby union season

- Countries: France
- Number of teams: 10
- Date: 12 September 2020 – 6 June 2021
- Champions: Title not awarded
- Promoted: RF Dijon Bourgogne; US Dax; Rugby Clermont La Plaine
- Relegated: Caen Rugby

Official website
- www.ffr.fr

The 2020–21 Élite 2 season kicked off on 12 September 2020 and was expected to conclude on 6 June 2021.

On 29 October 2020, the FRF announced the suspension of the competition in November and December 2020, due to a second lockdown, as well as the cancellation of the final stages in order to allow the opportunity to complete the competition at the end of the season.

On 26 February 2021, the FRF announced the definitive end of amateur competitions and the freezing of promotions and relegations for all levels.

== Format ==
The competition was expected to be played in the form of a single group of 10 teams in "home and away" matches. Teams ranked 1st and 4th that qualified for the semi-finals were to play at the home ground of the higher-ranked teams.

== Participants ==
Teams competing in the 2020–21 Élite 2 season are as follows:

Teams	Note
Caen Rugby	Relegated following 2019–20 Elite 1 season.
USA Limoges	Teams returning following 2019–20 Elite 2 season that did not qualify for the final.
Stade Rochelais	Teams returning following 2019–20 Elite 2 season that did not qualify for the final.
RC Narbonne	Teams returning following 2019–20 Elite 2 season that did not qualify for the final.
USAP Women's XV Roussillon	Teams returning following 2019–20 Elite 2 season that did not qualify for the final.
Entente Bruges Blanquefort	Teams returning following 2019–20 Elite 2 season that did not qualify for the final.
Stado Tarbes Pyrénées Rugby	Teams returning following 2019–20 Elite 2 season that did not qualify for the final.
RF Dijon Bourgogne	Promoted following 2019–20 Fédérale 1 season.
US Dax	Promoted following 2019–20 Fédérale 1 season.
Rugby Clermont La Plaine	Promoted following 2019–20 Fédérale 1 season.

== Regular season standings ==
Rank	Club	GP	W	D	L	OB	DB	PF	PA	Diff	Points
1	Rugby Clermont La Plaine (P)	4	4	0	0	4	0	115	0	+115	20
2	Stade Rochelais	3	3	0	0	3	0	109	18	+91	15
3	USA Limoges	2	2	0	0	1	0	56	27	+29	9
4	US Dax (P)	4	2	0	2	0	1	59	83	–24	9
5	RC Narbonne	3	2	0	1	0	0	29	59	–30	8
6	Entente Bruges Blanquefort	3	1	1	1	0	0	27	32	–5	6
7	Stado Tarbes Pyrénées Rugby	4	1	1	2	0	0	30	72	–42	6
8	USAP Women's XV Roussillon	3	0	0	3	0	1	20	63	–43	1
9	Caen Rugby (R)	3	0	0	3	0	1	25	78	–53	1
10	RF Dijon Bourgogne (P)	3	0	0	3	0	0	30	68	–38	0

R : relegated 2020 • P : promoted 2020
