= Fédérale 2 (women's rugby) =

- Sport: Rugby union
- No. of teams: 60
- Country: France
- Most recent champion: University of Toulouse (2024–25)
- Most titles: Castres (2 titles)
- Level on pyramid: Level 4
- Promotion to: Fédérale 1

Fédérale 2 is the fourth and last division of women's rugby union in France. The winner is promoted to Fédérale 1, while four teams from Fédérale 1 are relegated to this competition.

== History ==
After several years of existence, the 2nd federal division was discontinued following the 2014–15 season after the merging of the three federal divisions that existed until then into a single federal division called Pratique à XV.

It was revived for the 2016–17 season onwards in a format that involved 60 teams, either individually or in combined teams. The championship was played in three phases: a preliminary phase (12 groups of 5), a playoff phase (6 groups of 4), and a final phase.

== Champions ==
Season	Winner	Score	Finalist
2010–11	Castres	11–5	AC Bobigny 93 B
2011–12	Stade Poitevin	?	La Pallice
2012–13	Castres		
2013–14	Montpellier HR B	7–0	Stade Rennais B
2016–17	Union des Bords de Marne	7–5	SU Agen
2017–18	Toulouse Cheminots	18–17	CA Périgueux
2018–19	FC Grenoble B	29–12	Stade Français B
2019–20	The FRF cancelled all amateur competitions for the 2019–20, and 2020–21 seasons due to the lockdown period following the COVID-19 pandemic.		
2020–21	The FRF cancelled all amateur competitions for the 2019–20, and 2020–21 seasons due to the lockdown period following the COVID-19 pandemic.		
2021–22	AS Granoise	17–10	Racing Nanterre
2022–23	CS Bourgoin-Jallieu	21–13	Caen
2023–24	Stade Rochelais B	36–12	Paris Olympique RC
2024–25	University of Toulouse	55–12	Blacks Simones Stade Aurillacois
2025–26	TBD	TBD	TBD
