= Pauline Barrat =

France international rugby union player

- Born: 1 June 2004 (age 22) La Rochelle, France

Rugby union career
- Position(s): Fly-half, Full-back
Senior career
Years	Team	Apps	(Points)
2021–2023	Stade Rochelais		
2023–	Stade Toulousain		
International career
Years	Team	Apps	(Points)
2026–	France		

Pauline Barrat (born 1 June 2004) is a French rugby union player. She plays internationally for France and for Stade Toulousain in Élite 1. Having made her debut in the competition, Barrat was named 2026 Women's Six Nations Championship Breakthrough Player of the Tournament. In 2026, she was also nominated for Women’s 15s Breakthrough Player of the Year by World Rugby.

== Career ==
Capable of playing fly-half and full-back, Barratt began playing rugby union at the age of eight year-old in La Rochelle, and played in mixed teams, often as the only girl, until U14 level. By age 17, Barrat was playing regularly in the French second division for Stade Rochelais. However, her progress was halted in 2021 when she suffered a left knee anterior cruciate ligament (ACL) injury. On her return, she was selected for the France Sevens development squad.

In February 2023, at the age of 18, was called up to the France women's national rugby union team to prepare for the Six Nations Tournament, becoming the first player from La Rochelle and the only Elite 2 player selected. She signed for Stade Toulousain in 2023 but her 2023-24 season was ended early by another ACL injury.

In 2025, she was awarded MVP for France U20 for her efforts during the Women’s Summer Series. In March 2026, she made her debut for France in the 2026 Women's Six Nations Championship, scoring a try on debut against Italy in a 38-0 victory. Throughout the championship as a whole, Barrat ranked in the top five for carries, metres gained, defenders beaten and line breaks, and was named in the team of the tournament. She was also named Women’s 2026 Six Nations Breakthrough Player of the Tournament.

In October 2026, she was nominated for Women’s 15s Breakthrough Player of the Year by World Rugby.
