= Beatrice Veronese =

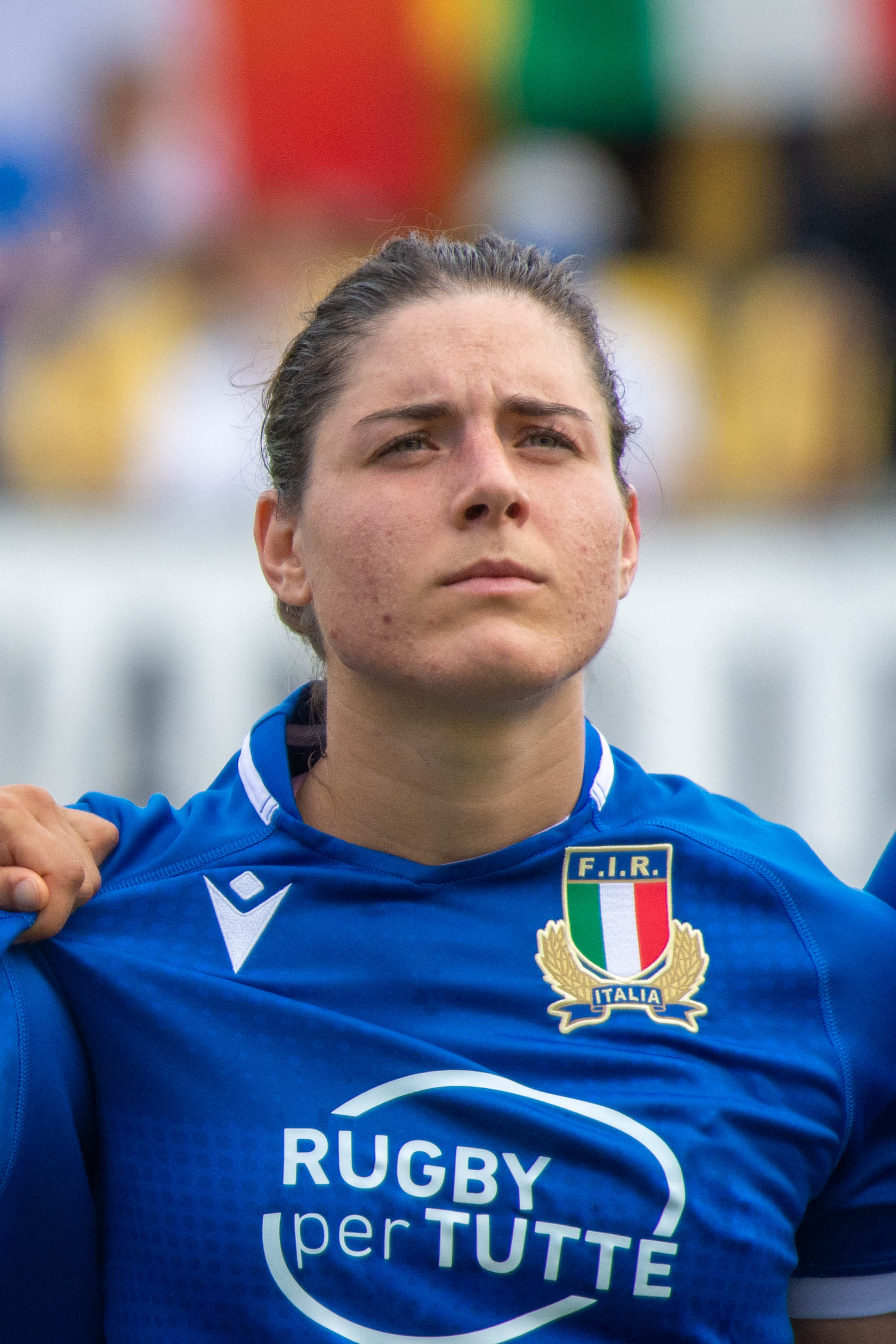
- Veronese before the RWC qualification match against Spain in 2021.
- Born: 11 March 1996 (age 30)
- Height: 173 cm (5 ft 8 in)
- Weight: 73 kg (161 lb; 11 st 7 lb)

Rugby union career
- Position: Back row
Senior career
| Years | Team | Apps | (Points) |
| 2014–2025 | Valsugana | | (0) |
| 2025– | RC Toulon PM | | (0) |
International career
| Years | Team | Apps | (Points) |
| 2017– | Italy | 31 | (0) |

Beatrice Veronese (born 11 March 1996) is an Italian rugby union player. She plays in the Back row for Italy internationally, and for French club, Toulon, in the Élite 1 competition.

== Rugby career ==
Veronese was born in Padova, Italy, she trained with Valsugana's youth teams and remained with them even after her debut in the Serie A Elite competition. While at Valsugana, she won three consecutive championships from 2015 to 2017 and a fourth in 2022.

In 2017, she started in her international debut for Italy against France in Biella. She took part in the World Cup qualifiers and was eventually called up to the squad for the 2021 Rugby World Cup in New Zealand. She was part of the first group of Italian female rugby players given semi-professional contracts by the Italian Rugby Federation in 2022.

She joined French club, Toulon, in the Élite 2 competition in 2025. She received a call-up for the 2025 Women's Rugby World Cup in England.
