= Valkyries Normandie Rugby Clubs =

Valkyries Normandie RC
- Founded: 2021; 5 years ago
- Ground: Stade Jean-Mermoz
- President: Delphine Bunel
- Coach: Alexis Vairy
- Captain: Clémence Deu
- League: Élite 2
- 2024–25: 6th
Team kit

Official website
- www.les-valkyries-rouen.com

Valkyries Normandie Rugby Clubs are a French women's rugby union club, based in Rouen. They compete in the Élite 2 competition, which is the second division of women's rugby in France. The club was founded in 2021, and was formed from the merger of the first teams of Ovalie Caennaise and AS Rouen UC. Their reserve team competes in Fédérale 2, the fourth and last division.

== History ==
In 2021, Ovalie Caennaise and AS Rouen UC merged their women's first teams to form a single Normandy team. The team was named Valkyries Normandie Rugby Clubs and was registered in Elite 2 for the 2021–2022 season.

In its first season, the squad consisted of approximately two-thirds of players from Rouen and one-third from Caen. Each club retained its independence and its youth teams. They won the Elite 2 championship title in Grenoble against Stade Rochelais. As the first division was reduced from 14 to 12 teams, they had to play a promotion match to reach the first division. They lost 33–0 to Lons Section Paloise.

The club signed an agreement with the city of Lisieux and the Normandy regional rugby league to be able to train together once a week in Lisieux.

In 2023, the Valkyries finished third in the standings and lost their semi-final against Stade Français, 25–43.

== Current squad ==
2025–26 Élite 2 season squad:

Valkyries Normandie RC squad
**Front row**: (France) Louise Aumont; (France) Margot Cousin; (France) Thérèse Diedhiou; (France) Marion Loferme; (France) Rozenn Vittecoq Pichard; (France) Emma Reymondoux; (France) Nolwenn Scolan; (France) Annabelle Souillard; (France) Léa Van-Theemsche; (France) Cloé Vienney; **Locks**: (France) Émilie Angibault; (France) Capucine Deshayes; (France) Lara Golman; (France) Léa Clamy-Edroux	**Loose forwards**: (France) Aimée Barthélemy; (France) Lucie Brubion; (France) Ella Delamarre; (France) Clémence Deu (c); (France) Cassandre Douis; (France) Manon Henault (vc); (France) Lison Joubert; (France) Emmy Lemesle; **Scrum-halves**: (France) Lucile Aubry; (France) Oanell Le Tallec; (France) Lisa Poli; (France) Charlène Tonnelé; **Fly-halves**: (France) Noémie Bessaa; (France) Gwenn Cheminant	**Centres**: (France) Léa Bérnard; (France) Charlotte Berthelot (vc); (France) Madisson Mabi; (France) Lola Tregret; **Wingers**: (France) Noémie Begorre; (Canada) Rachel Hickson; (France) Sarah Labonne; (France) Juliette Perlin; (France) Clara Philippot; **Fullbacks**: (France) Loreleï Maris
(c) Denotes team captain, **Bold** denotes internationally capped, ^{SP} denotes a shadow player and ^{ST} indicated short-term cover.

== Honours ==
- Élite 2:
  - Winner (1): 2022

== Finals results ==
List of finals played by Valkyries Normandie RC
Competition	Date	Champion	Score	Runner-up	Venue
Élite 2	4 June 2022	Valkyrie Normandie RC	8–7	Stade Rochelais	Stade Lesdiguières, Grenoble
