= Élite 2 (rugby union) =

French women's rugby union competition

Élite 2 Féminine
- Sport: Rugby union
- Founded: 2004; 22 years ago
- First season: 2004
- No. of teams: 10
- Country: France
- Most recent champion: Stade Rochelais (2024)
- Most titles: Lille MRC Villeneuvois; AS Bayonne (2 titles each)
- Level on pyramid: Level 2
- Promotion to: Élite 1 Féminine
- Relegation to: Fédérale 1
- Website: Élite 2 Féminine

Élite 2 Féminine is the second tier of national women's rugby union competition in France. Called Élite 2 since 2018 or Élite 2 Armelle-Auclair from 2004 to 2018. From this competition you can be promoted to Élite 1 Féminine.

== History ==
From 2004 to 2018, the Elite 2 championship bears the name of Armelle Auclair, a French rugby union player who died on July 13, 2002, in Mauléon-Licharre, at the age of 28.

== League ==
Since 2021, the championship is composed of two phases:

- The main season where the 10 clubs play each other home and away throughout the season.
- The post-season playoffs contested between the top four teams ranked clubs 1st to 4th.

== Current teams ==
Location of teams in the 2025–26 Élite 2 season

| Club | Coach | Stadium | Capacity |
|---|---|---|---|
| Stade Rennais | Hugo Mattes | Stade du Commandant Bougouin | 5,000 |
| Stade Rochelais | Alexandre Barès | Plaine des Jeux Colette Besson | N/A |
| Section Paloise | Michaël Dallery | Stade municipal de Lons | N/A |
| AS Bayonne | Yvan Abadie; Vincent Lesca | Stade Pierre-Carcareigt | N/A |
| Stade Français | James Zié | Centre sportif Christophe-Dominici Complexe sportif René-Leduc | N/A |
| Valkyries Normandie RC | Alexis Vairy | Stade Jean-Mermoz | 2,800 |
| CA Brive | Romain Cabanero | Stade Jean-Marie Soubira | N/A |
| USA Perpignan | Charlotte Torres-Duxans | Stade Roger Ramis / Stade Aimé Giral | N/A / 14,593 |
| Racing Club de France | Alex Gau | Stade Yves-du-Manoir | 15,000 |
| US Colomiers | Guillaume Galéa; Nicolas Bederede | Stade Michel Bendichou | 11,430 |

== Champions ==
=== 2000–2009 ===
| Season | (gold) Champion | Score | (silver) Runner-up | Venue | Ref |
|---|---|---|---|---|---|
| 2004 | ESP Bruges Blanquefort | 12–6 | Stade Rennais | | |
| 2005 | Montpellier RC | 14–11 | Stade Rennais | | |
| 2006 | Lille Métropole RC Villeneuvois | 14–9 | ES Nanterre | | |
| 2007 | RC Lons | 10–3 | Pachys d'Herm | Grenoble | |
| 2008 | RF Dijon Bourgogne | 13–13 (2 tries to 1) | Rugby Sassenage Isère | | |
| 2009 | Saint-Orens RF | 13–13 (5 tries to 3) | AC Bobigny 93 | | |

=== 2010–2019 ===
| Season | (gold) Champion | Score | (silver) Runner-up | Venue |
|---|---|---|---|---|
| 2010 | CSM Gennevilliers | 8–0 | RC Chilly-Mazarin | Versailles |
| 2011 | Lille Métropole RC villeneuvois | 31–15 | Stade Bordelais | |
| 2012 | Stade Bordelais | 29–20 | AS Bayonne | Stade Municipal, Herm |
| 2013 | RC Valettois Revestois | 18–12 | Ovalie Romagnatoise CA | Mauguio |
| 2014 | AS Bayonne | 16–15 | Avenir Fonsorbais | Ossun |
| 2015 | Stade Toulousain | 16–13 | AS Bayonne | Stade de Bouque de Lens, Cassagne |
| 2016 | Ovalie Romagnatoise CA | 29–7 | Lyon OU | Unieux |
| 2017 | AS Bayonne | 34–10 | FC Grenoble | Stade de la Méditerranée, Béziers |
| 2018 | FC Grenoble | 6–5 | Lons RF | Pézenas |
| 2019 | Lyon OU | 22–13 | RC Chilly-Mazarin | Stade Maurice Trélut, Tarbes |

=== 2020–2029 ===
| Season | (gold) Champion | Score | (silver) Runner-up | Venue | Ref | Highlights |
|---|---|---|---|---|---|---|
| 2020 | Season interrupted by COVID-19 | | | | | |
| 2021 | Season interrupted by COVID-19 | | | | | |
| 2022 | Valkyries Normandie RC | 8–7 | Stade Rochelais | Stade Lesdiguières, Grenoble | | |
| 2023 | Stade Français | 22–3 | Stade Rochelais | Stade Sainte-Germaine, Le Bouscat | | |
| 2024 | Stade Rochelais | 30–19 | RC Toulon PM | Stade Pierre Rajon, Bourgoin-Jallieu | | |
| 2025 | RC Toulon PM | 14–12 | Stade Rochelais | Stade Jacques-Fouroux, Auch | | |
| 2026 | | | | | | |
| 2027 | | | | | | |
| 2028 | | | | | | |
| 2029 | | | | | | |

== Winners and runners-up ==
- Current Élite 2 Féminine participating clubs indicated in bold

| Club | Wins | Runners-up | Winning Seasons | Last win |
|---|---|---|---|---|
| **AS Bayonne** | 2 | 2 | 2014 2017 | 2017 |
| Lille Métropole RC Villeneuvois | 2 | 0 | 2006 2011 | 2011 |
| FC Grenoble Amazones | 1 | 2 | 2018 | 2018 |
| **Stade Rochelais** | 1 | 2 | 2024 | 2024 |
| **Lons Section Paloise** | 1 | 1 | 2007 | 2007 |
| Stade Bordelais | 1 | 1 | 2012 | 2012 |
| Stade Toulousain | 1 | 1 | 2015 | 2015 |
| Ovalie Romagnatoise Clermont Auvergne | 1 | 1 | 2016 | 2016 |
| Lyon Olympique Universitaire | 1 | 1 | 2019 | 2019 |
| ES Bruges Blanquefort | 1 | 0 | 2004 | 2004 |
| RF Dijon Bourgogne | 1 | 0 | 2008 | 2008 |
| Saint-Orens Rugby Féminin | 1 | 0 | 2009 | 2009 |
| CSM Gennevilliers | 1 | 0 | 2010 | 2010 |
| RC Valettois Revestois | 1 | 0 | 2013 | 2013 |
| **Valkyries Normandie RC** | 1 | 0 | 2022 | 2022 |
| **Stade Français** | 1 | 0 | 2023 | 2023 |
| Montpellier RC | 1 | 1 | 2005 | 2005 |
| RC Toulon Provence Méditerranée | 1 | 1 | 2025 | 2025 |
| **Stade Rennais** | 0 | 2 | | |
| RC Chilly-Mazarin | 0 | 2 | | |
| Racing Nanterre Rugby | 0 | 1 | | |
| Pachys d'Herm | 0 | 1 | | |
| AC Bobigny 93 Rugby | 0 | 1 | | |
