= Giada Corradini =

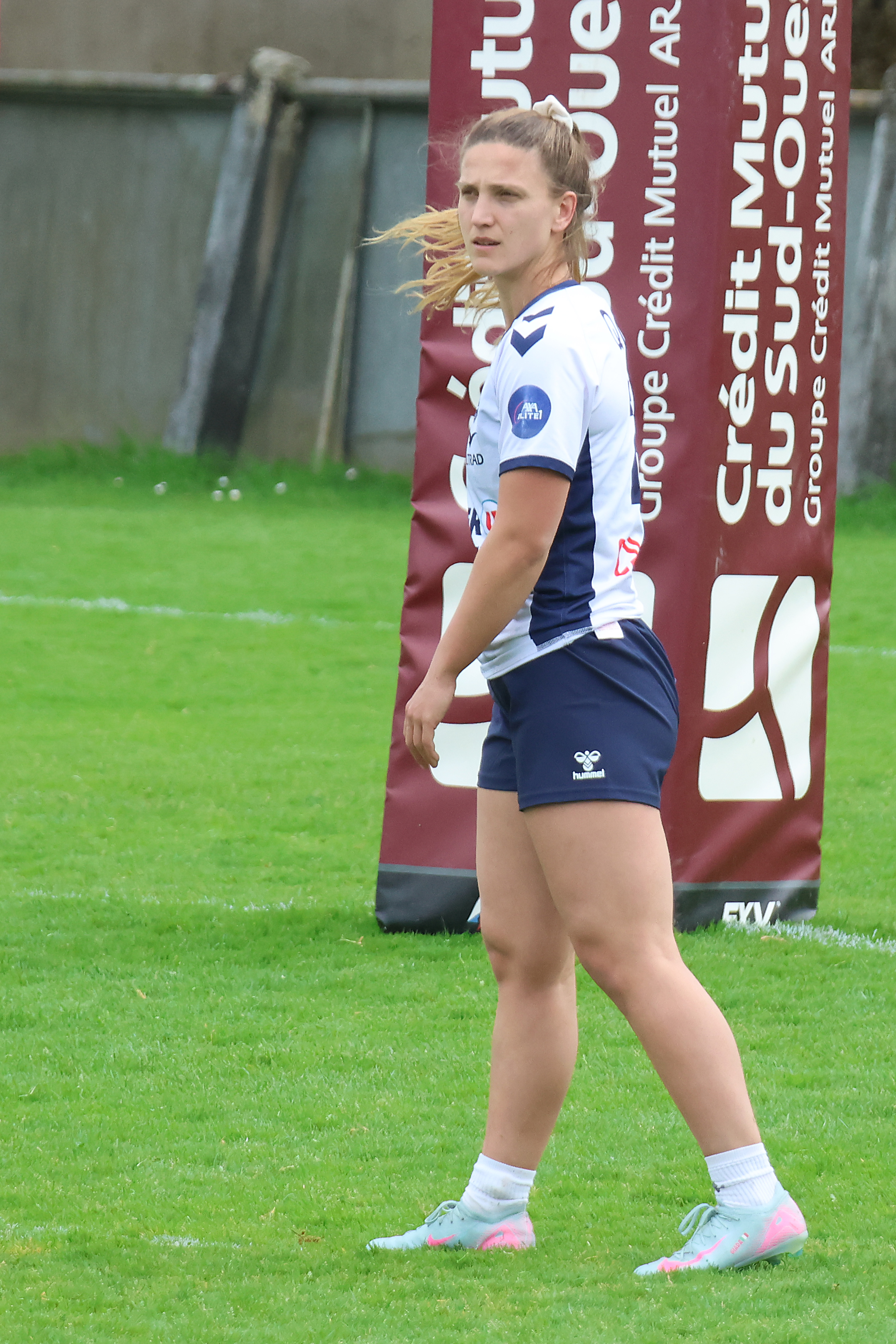
- Born: 17 April 2002 (age 24) Pesaro
- Height: 168 cm (5 ft 6 in)
- Weight: 70 kg (154 lb; 11 st 0 lb)

Rugby union career
- Position: Centre
Senior career
Years	Team	Apps	(Points)
2019–2025	Colorno		(0)
2025–	Montpellier		(0)
International career
Years	Team	Apps	(Points)
2025–	Italy	2	(5)

Giada Corradini (born 17 April 2002) is an Italian rugby union player. She represented Italy at the 2025 Women's Rugby World Cup.

== Rugby career ==
Corradini was born in Pesaro, she played for her local club until she was 17 before moving to Colorno in 2019, where she made her Serie A Elite debut.

A year after her Serie A debut, club rugby was cancelled for almost two seasons because of restrictions imposed due to the COVID-19 pandemic. After returning to full activity at the end of 2021, she was selected for both the Italy sevens and Under-20 fifteens teams. In 2024, she was part of the first women's team for Zebre Parma.

Corradini was included in Italy's squad for the 2025 Six Nations but did not get to make her debut. She made her international debut against Japan in a warm-up match ahead of the Rugby World Cup. She was subsequently included in Italy's squad to the 2025 Women's Rugby World Cup in England.

Corradini will play for French club, Montpellier, in the Élite 1 competition for the 2025–26 season.
