= Élite 2 =

Élite 2 may refer to:

- Élite 2 (basketball), the second-tier level men's professional basketball league in France
- Élite 2 (rugby union), the second-tier of national women's rugby union competition in France
- Elite 2 (rugby league), the second-tier semi-professional rugby league competition in France
