= Laetitia Royer =

Canadian rugby union player

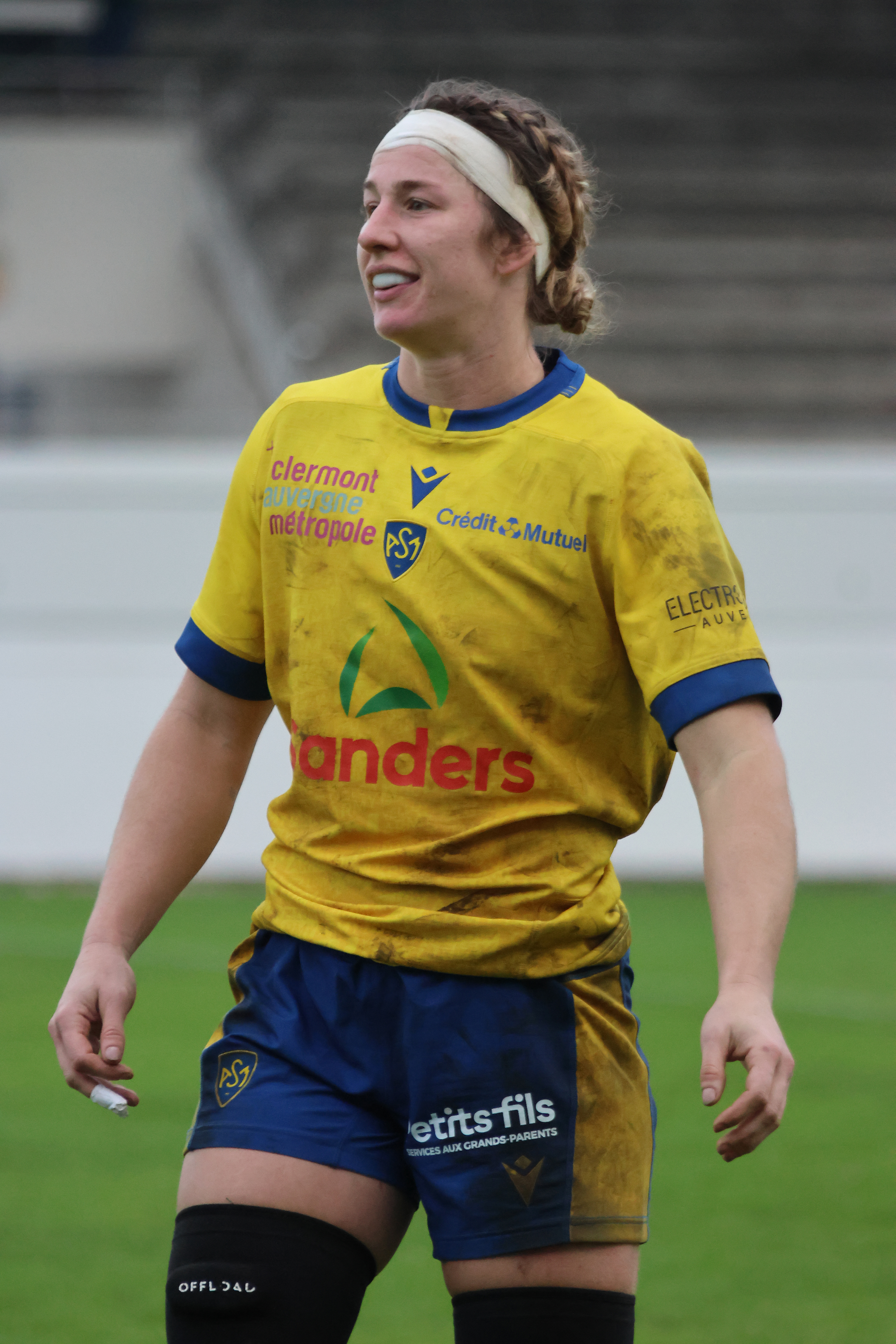
- Royer playing for ASM Romagnat in 2023
- Born: 9 February 1991 (age 35) Loretteville, Canada
- Height: 179 cm (5 ft 10 in)
- Weight: 83 kg (183 lb; 13 st 1 lb)

Rugby union career
- Position: Back Row
- Current team: ASM Romagnat
Senior career
Years	Team	Apps	(Points)
2020–2022	Lons Section Paloise		(0)
2023–Present	ASM Romagnat		(0)
International career
Years	Team	Apps	(Points)
	Canada	22	(30)
- Correct as of 2025-09-27
Medal record
Women's rugby union
Representing Canada
World Cup
Silver medal – second place	2025 England	Team competition

Laetitia Royer (born 9 February 1991) is a Canadian rugby union player who plays in the Back row. She represented Canada at the 2025 Women's Rugby World Cup.

== Career ==
Royer was born in Loretteville, Quebec.

In 2020, she joined the French club Lons Section Paloise, after two seasons at the club, she left after their final match where she scored a try in a 33–0 victory against the Valkyries Normandie RC allowing them to stay in Élite 1.

In October 2022, she was selected in Canada's squad to participate in the Rugby World Cup in New Zealand.

At the beginning of 2023, she joined ASM Romagnat in Élite 1. In October that year, she was called up to the Canadian side to participate in the inaugural WXV tournament in New Zealand.

In April 2024, she was selected to compete in the Pacific Four Series which Canada won after beating New Zealand in Christchurch for the first time in their history.

She was selected in Canada's squad for the 2025 Pacific Four Series. Later in July, she was named in the Canadian side to the Rugby World Cup in England.
