= Lons Section Paloise =

- Founded: 1996; 30 years ago
- Ground: Complexe Sportif Georges Martin
- President: Lise Arricastre
- Coach: Michaël Dallery
- League: Élite 2
- 2024–25: 3rd (Semi-finalist)
Team kit

Official website
- www.lonsrugbyfeminin.com

Lons Section Paloise are a French women's rugby union club, based in Lons. They compete in the Élite 2 competition, which is the second division of women's rugby in France.

Lons women's rugby Béarn Pyrénées joined the Section Paloise omnisports club in 2021 to become Lons Section Paloise women's rugby. The club comprises two senior teams, the first playing in Élite 2 and the second in Fédérale 1. They also have two U16 girls' teams and one U14 girls' team making up the club's youth program. The club shares its history and facilities with the Lons Rugby Club.

== History ==
The club was established in 1996. In 2006, the team won their first championship title in Division 2. They also created a second women's team that year which competed in the Division 3 National competition.

In 2007, the first team secured their second French championship title in Division 1. The second team reached the quarter-finals of the Division 3 championship that year.

In 2008, the first team reached the semi-finals of the Top 9, the elite competition of French women's rugby. The second team made a second quarter-final appearance in their Division 3 championship. The club also created a junior girls' team in 2008.

In June 2010, the women's second team, after four final phases, obtained their first Division 3 12-a-side championship title by beating the second team of Lille Métropole in Issoudun.

Following the relegation of the women's team in Élite 2 Armelle-Auclair in 2014, several key players left the club, Caroline Ladagnous, Pauline Raymond, Christelle Chobet, Mélanie Busque, and Méryl Dubertrand.

Starting from the 2015–2016 season, the women's section of RC Lons became "Lons Rugby féminin Béarn Pyrénées" following the merger with Section Paloise. After formalizing its independence from the Rugby Club Lonsois in 2015, the club sought to structure itself and gain visibility, and moved towards closer ties with the amateur Section Paloise. However, the club retained its facilities at the Georges-Martin complex in Lons.

In 2018, following the reorganization of the women's divisions and the expansion of the 1st division from 8 to 16 clubs, Lons women's rugby joined Elite 1. During the 2019–2020 Elite 1 season, Canadian international Elisabeth Langevin, suffered a spinal fracture on 12 January 2020 against Chilly-Mazarin, the injury ended her career.

At the start of the 2021–2022 Women's Elite 1 season, the club joined the Section Paloise multi-sports club, "Lons Rugby Féminin Béarn Pyrénées", and was renamed "Lons Section Paloise Rugby Féminin." In 2021, the club signed four Canadian players, Laetitia Royer, Sarah-Maude Lachance, Audrey Champagne and Emmanuella Jada. The club also signed Japanese captain, Makiko Tomita, she was the first Japanese player to join a French club.

At the end of the 2023–2024 season, the first team was relegated to Elite 2 after losing its two play-down matches against Bobigny. Despite its relegation to Elite 2, Lons Section Paloise Béarn Pyrénées has taken strategic steps to return to the top level by appointing Michaël Dallery as head coach of its first team. He served as scrum coach for the Portuguese men's national team at the 2023 Rugby World Cup, and as performance director for the Romanian national team; he assumed the responsibilities of sporting director and forwards coach, thus bringing his considerable expertise and experience to the club.

In September 2025, former French international Lise Arricastre was unanimously elected president of the club, succeeding Jean-François Lombard, who had been in office for twelve years.

== Current squad ==
2025–26 Élite 2 season squad:

Note: Flags indicate national union under World Rugby eligibility rules. Players may hold more than one non-World Rugby nationality.

Player	Position	Union
Maelis Adolphe	Hooker	France
Emilie Lasserre	Hooker	France
Fanny Pujol	Hooker	France
Auriane Zanon	Hooker	France
Lucie Elgoyhen	Prop	France
Laure Etchemendy	Prop	France
Hannane Habib Chorfa	Prop	France
Alexandra Hourcade	Prop	France
Louna Magere	Prop	France
Mendy Mariette	Prop	France
Omaïa Pouyoune-Bolota	Prop	France
Delphine Renon	Prop	France
Claire Sanchez	Prop	France
Julia Dubois	Lock	France
Jeanne Ménard Ploquin	Lock	France
Marine Aguilar	Flanker	France
Julie Barrouillet	Flanker	France
Emilie Cazanave	Flanker	France
Jade Flipo	Flanker	France
Justine Lurie	Flanker	France
Lola Dufrechou	Number 8	France
Anaïs Kubler	Forward	France
Sindy Point	Forward	France

Player	Position	Union
Marie Gourgues	Scrum-half	France
Olivia Langlois	Scrum-half	France
Joana Narbeburu	Scrum-half	France
Lola Pesenti	Scrum-half	France
Manon Darthos	Fly-half	France
Susane Dumas	Fly-half	France
Lison Hoqui	Fly-half	France
Anna Castanier	Centre	France
Lisa Cazaux	Centre	France
Laura Delas	Centre	France
Solene Stoppani	Centre	France
Adeline Carrasquet	Wing	France
Clara Cheminot	Wing	France
Maika Duputs	Wing	France
Hanae Pavilla	Wing	France
Camille Sasseville	Wing	France
Elsa Parmentelot	Back	France

- Senior 15s internationally capped players are listed in **bold**.

== Honours ==
- Élite 1:
  - Champion: 2012
- Élite 2:
  - Champion: 2007
  - Runner-up: 2018
- Fédérale 1:
  - Champion: 2006
- 3rd Division:
  - Champion: 2010
- Elite Sevens:
  - Champion: 2011

List of finals played by Lons Section Paloise
Competition	Date	Champion	Score	Runner-up	Venue
Division 2	2007	RC Lons	13–11	Pachys d'Herm	Grenoble
Division 1	10 June 2012	RC Lons	14–10	Montpellier HR	Stade de Loudes, L'Union
Division 2	13 May 2018	FC Grenoble Amazones	6–5	Lons Rugby féminin	Pézenas

== International players ==
- (France) Mayalen Achigar
- (France) Sonia Amat
- (France) Lise Arricastre
- (France) Mélanie Busque
- (France) Patricia Carricaburu
- (France) Nadège Casenave
- (France) Christelle Chobet
- (France) Laura Delas
- (France) Koumiba Djossouvi
- (France) Laetitia Grand
- (France) Caroline Ladagnous
- (France) Pauline Raymond
- (France) Stephanie Rodriguez
- (France) Cecilia Speed
- (Canada) Elisabeth Langevin
- (Canada) Laetitia Royer
- (Canada) Sarah-Maude Lachance
- (Canada) Audrey Champagne
- (Canada) Emmanuella Jada
- (Japan) Makiko Tomita
