= USA Perpignan Women =

USA Perpignan
- Founded: 1997; 29 years ago
- Ground(s): Stade Roger Ramis; Stade Aimé Giral
- President: Aurore Andrieux Sagols
- Coach: Nicolas Grelon
- League: Élite 2
- 2024–25: 8th
Team kit	2nd kit

Official website
- usap-xv-feminin.ffr.fr

USA Perpignan Women is a French rugby union club, based in Perpignan. They compete in the Élite 2 competition, which is the second division of women's rugby in France.

== History ==
The club was formerly based in Toulouges and was called "USA Toulouges XV". In 2008, following a disagreement between USA Toulouges and the municipality of Toulouges, the club became the women's section of the USAP association under the name "USAP XV Féminin".

In its first season in 2009, the club became European champions by winning the final against Spanish club, Getxo. They also reached the Top 10 final, but lost 19–16 to Montpellier.

The following season, they became French champions after beating Montpellier 26–5. In 2011, USAP retained their title by beating Stade Rennais Rugby in the final with a score of 15–11.

In 2016, the club finished last in the Top 8 and was relegated to Elite 2. The only women's rugby club in the department to play at the national level, USAP Féminin continues its restructuring to once again reach Elite 1, relying last season on 130 players from the U14, U16 and senior categories.

For the past three seasons, the club has been on the right track, having qualified for the semi-finals of the French championship in 2021–2022 and 2023–2024.

== Honours ==
- Élite 1:
  - Champions (6): 2004, 2005, 2006, 2008, 2010, 2011.
  - Runner-up: 2009
- Women's Clubs European Cup: 2009.

== Finals results ==
Élite 1 Finals played by USA Perpignan
Date	Champion	Score	Runner-up	Venue
2004	USA Toulouges XV	8–6	Ovalie caennaise	Isle
11 June 2005	USA Toulouges XV	7–3	Ovalie caennaise	Stade de France, Saint-Denis
2006	USA Toulouges XV	8–3	Stade Rennais Rugby	La Roche-sur-Yon
2008	USA Toulouges XV	18–15	Montpellier HRC	Parc des sports et de l'amitié, Narbonne
15 June 2009	Montpellier HRC	19–16	USAP XV féminin	Gruissan
29 May 2010	USAP XV féminin	26–05	Montpellier HRC	Stade Jean-Bouin, Paris
19 June 2011	USAP XV féminin	15–11	Stade Rennais Rugby	Saint-Médard-en-Jalles

Women's Clubs European Cup
Date	Champion	Score	Runner-up	Venue
1 February 2009	USAP XV féminin (France)	19–11	(Spain) Getxo (Bilbao)	Bilbao (Away)
22 February 2009	USAP XV féminin (France)	82–3	(Spain) Getxo (Bilbao)	Toulouges (Home)

== International players ==
- Aurélie Bailon
- Marie Bourret
- Maud Camatta
- Catherine Devillers
- Fanny Gelis
- Fanny Horta
- Caroline Ladagnous
- Christelle Le Duff
- Myriam Loyez
- Aline Sagols
- Laetitia Salles
- Marion Talayrach
- Charlotte Torres
