= CA Brive Women =

CA Brive
- Founded: 2012; 14 years ago
- Ground: Stade Jean-Marie Soubira
- Coach: Romain Cabanero
- League: Élite 2
- 2024–25: 7th

Official website
- cabrive-association.com

CA Brive Women is a French rugby union club, based in Brive-la-Gaillarde. They compete in the Élite 2 competition, which is the second division of women's rugby in France.

== History ==
The women's team was created in August 2012, under the aegis of the CABCL association.

As early as 2014, the Brive players won their first titles, in the Limousin championship, in the South-West sector championship, as well as in the French Federal 3 championship.

Since the late 2010s, the club has supported the development of the women's team through full-time professional contract management via a dedicated sports manager in the person of Romain Cabanero, as well as the creation of a "club academy" in partnership with local high schools.

At the end of the 2022–2023 season, the club won the final and thus secured its promotion to Elite 2; they also played in the 2023–2024 Elite 2 season.

== Honours ==
- Fédérale 1:
  - Champion: 2023.

== Related article ==
- CA Brive
