= AS Bayonne =

- Founded: 1992; 34 years ago
- Ground: Stade Pierre-Carcareigt
- President: Aurélie Vedere; Mathieu Dupouy
- Coach(es): Yvan Abadie; Vincent Lesca
- League: Élite 2
- 2024–25: 4th (Semi-finalist)
1st kit	2nd kit

Official website
- a-s-bayonnaise64.ffr.fr

AS Bayonne is a French women's rugby union club. They are based in Bayonne and compete in the Élite 2 competition, which is the second division of women's rugby in France.

== History ==
The women's rugby union section of AS Bayonne was created in 1992. At the end of the 2007–2008 season, the Bayonne women secured the club's promotion to the 1st division.

In 2021, the club established a closer relationship with Aviron Bayonnais, to help the women's section develop and structure itself.

In November 2021, the ASB board of directors, chaired by Gilles Peynoche, unanimously decided to forfeit the remainder of the Elite 1 season following a protest by the players who refused to play their French Cup match against Stade Toulousain on 7th November. The players protested their poor training conditions and the lack of resources and players. The decision was ratified by the Federation on 1st December 2021.

In 2024, they were crowned Federale 1 champions and were promoted to the Elite 2 competition.

For their first season as a newly promoted team, ASB's objective was simply to avoid relegation. Jean-Michel Gonzalez stepped away from playing to become general manager. Against all odds, the team, coached by Yvan Abadie and Vincent Lesca, qualified for the semi-finals of the 2024–2025 championship, only to lose to Toulon 8–54 in the end.

== Honours ==
- Elite 2:
  - Champion (2): 2014, 2017
- Federale 1:
  - Champion (1): 2024
