= ASM Rugby Women =

- Founded: 1974; 52 years ago
- Ground(s): Stade Michel-Brun; Stade Marcel-Michelin
- President: Marie-Françoise Magignot
- Coach(es): Fabrice Ribeyrolles; Vincent Fargeas
- League: Élite 1
- 2024–25: 4th
Team kit

Official website
- asm-romagnat-rugby-feminin.ffr.fr

ASM Rugby Women are a French rugby union club, based in Clermont-Ferrand. They compete in the Élite 1 competition, which is the top division of women's rugby in France.

== History ==
ASM Romagnat women's team was founded in 1974 by nurses and physiotherapists at Clermont-Ferrand University Hospital, at the initiative of two former ASM and Romagnat players: Henri Laniray and Jeannot Vialon. The Romagnat men's rugby club supported the project and integrated the new women's team.

It became one of the best French teams of the 1990s with two French championship titles in 1994 and 1995, as well as runner-up in 1989, 1996, 1998.

In 2000, the club changed its name to Ovalie Romagnatoise Clermont Auvergne (ORCA).

At the end of the 2015–2016 season, ORCA was crowned French 2nd division champion after its victory in the final and earned promotion to the first division, the Top 8.

In 2016, the club entered into a partnership with the region's leading men's club, ASM Clermont Auvergne. Ovalie Romagnatoise Clermont Auvergne was officially renamed ASM Romagnat Women's Rugby with the French Rugby Federation on 30 June 2016. The objective of the partnership was to achieve greater visibility, to attract new practitioners (beginners or experienced) and new partners.

On 20 June 2021, ASM Romagnat beat Blagnac Rugby 13–8 in the latter's stadium, becoming French champions for a third time.

On 24 February 2024, during a French Championship match which was relocated to the Marcel-Michelin stadium between ASM Romagnat and Stade Bordelais, the attendance record for a match in the championship was set with 6,025 spectators present in the stadium. At the end of the season, they lost 32–17 in the French Championship final against Stade Bordelais.

On 21 January 2025, the ASM governing bodies announce the change of identity of the women's club, now operating under the name ASM Rugby Féminin. The name change shows a greater rapprochement between the two Auvergne clubs, embraced in the OneASM project, and a desire to develop women's rugby, particularly in Auvergne, as ASM specifies by wanting to "give more visibility, notoriety and attractiveness to ASM Women's Rugby and to women's sport."

During the 2025 off-season, the club strengthened its squad with the arrival of three French internationals: Yllana Brosseau, Alexandra Chambon and Assia Khalfaoui. At the same time, these three recruits were called up to play in the World Cup with France, as was Lina Tuy. In addition, Francesca Sgorbini was also called up to the Italian national team.

== Honours ==
- French First Division Championship:
  - Winner: 1994, 1995, 2021
  - Finalist: 1989, 1996, 1998
- French Second Division Championship:
  - Winner: 2016
  - Finalist: 2013
- French Cup:
  - Finalist: 1991

== Finals ==
| Compétition | Date | Champion | Score | Runner-up | Venue |
|---|---|---|---|---|---|
| 1st Division | 1989 | Violettes Bressanes | 19–12 | AS Romagnat | Montaigut-le-Blanc |
| 1st Division | 1994 | AS Romagnat | 21–12 | Saint-Orens | Maurs |
| 1st Division | 1995 | AS Romagnat | 10–6 | Pachys d'Herm | |
| 1st Division | 1996 | Rugby Club Chilly-Mazarin | 3–0 | AS Romagnat | Romorantin-Lanthenay |
| 1st Division | 1998 | Pachys d'Herm | 20–11 | AS Romagnat | Mussidan |
| 2nd Division | 2013 | RC Valettois Revestois | 18–12 | Ovalie Romagnatoise CA | |
| 2nd Division | 22 May 2016 | Ovalie Romagnatoise CA | 29–7 | Lyon OU | Unieux |
| Élite 1 | 20 June 2021 | ASM Romagnat | 13–8 | Blagnac Rugby | Blagnac |

== Notable players ==
- (France) Yllana Brosseau
- (France) Alexandra Chambon
- (France) Assia Khalfaoui
- (France) Jessy Trémoulière
- (France) Lina Tuy
- (Canada) Laetitia Royer
- (Italy) Gaia Maris
- (Italy) Francesca Sgorbini
- (Italy) Sara Tounesi
- (Ireland) Linda Djougang
- (New Zealand) Toka Natua
