= Lénaïg Corson =

French rugby union player (born 1989)

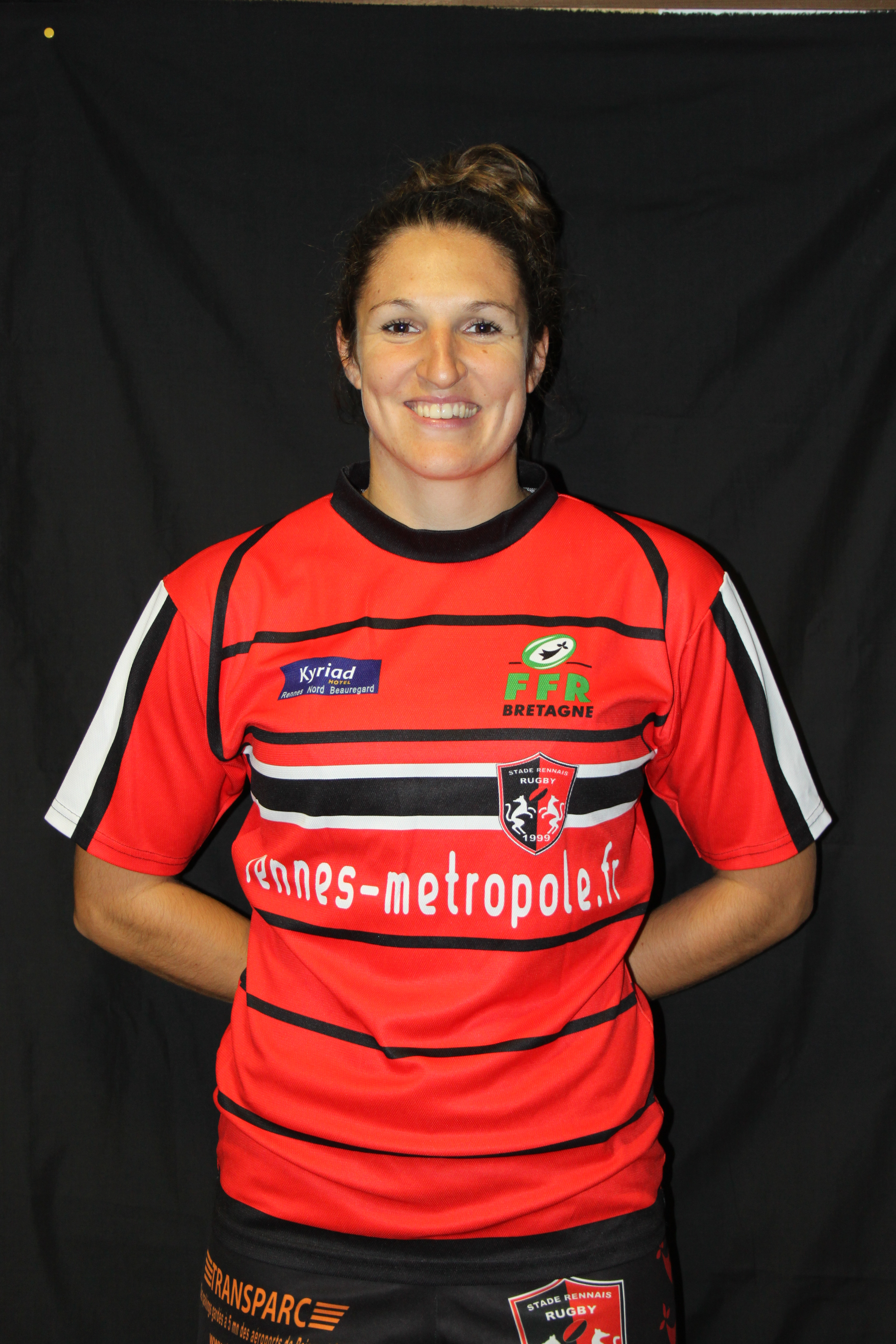
- Born: 15 March 1989 (age 37)
- Height: 186 cm (6 ft 1 in)

Rugby union career
- Position(s): Lock (XVs), Wing (7s)
Senior career
Years	Team	Apps	(Points)
2009–2010	Stade Rennais		
2010–2011	Burnside RUFC		
2011–2018	Stade Rennais		
2018–2022	Stade Français		
2022	Wasps		
2022–2023	Harlequins		
International career
Years	Team	Apps	(Points)
2012–2021	France	35	
National sevens team
Years	Team		Comps
- France 7s

Lénaïg Corson (born 15 March 1989) is a French international rugby player. She has 35 caps for the French national team.

== Early life ==
Lénaïg Corson was born on 15 March 1989. At the age of 6, she began playing sport. She took up athletics at the Ploumilliau athletics school. Her specialty was the heptathlon. She competed in this sport for 14 years with the TGA and then the Lannion Athlétisme club.

== Club career ==
Corson began playing rugby in 2009, at the age of 20, when she moved to Rennes to study. She explains that it was the only sport she could combine with her university schedule.

Between 2010 and 2011, she played for the Burnside Rugby Union club in Adelaide.

From 2011 to 2018, she played for the Rennes rugby club. She twice won the French university rugby championship with the Rennes university rugby team, in 2013 and 2014.

From 2018 to 2022, she played for the Paris rugby club.

In the summer of 2022, she joined Wasps in England. However, the club went into receivership a few weeks after her arrival. Despite the detachment of the women's team, the professional structure was unable to honor its financial contract. She then joined another London team, Harlequins, who also played in the English women's rugby league.

== International career ==
On 21 November 2012, she won her first cap for the French national team against the United States in Orléans.

She signed a semi-professional contract with the French Rugby Federation in 2014.

She was selected for the 2017 Women's Rugby World Cup. She won a Bronze medal and was named the best player of the match.

She was European vice-champion with the French Rugby 7s team in 2016 and 2018. She was a Bronze medalist on the World Rugby circuit in 2018.

Corson took part in five 6 Nations Tournaments in 2013, 2017, 2019, 2020 and 2021.

== Retirement ==
Lénaïg Corson retired at the end of the 2023 season after a 14-year career. She explains that she could have played one or two more seasons, but that she was living in precarious conditions, earning 800 pounds a month (around 940 euros), which was the price of her rent. She remained connected to rugby, however, and has launched her women's rugby academy, the "RugbyGirl Academy".

== TV and radio career ==
She was a consultant for the 2023 Men's Rugby World Cup for television channel M6 and radio station RMC.
