= Colomiers Rugby Women =

Colomiers Rugby
- Founded: 2015; 11 years ago
- Ground: Stade Michel Bendichou
- Coach(es): Guillaume Galéa; Nicolas Bederede
- League: Élite 2
- 2024–25: Fédérale 1, Runner-up (Promoted)

Official website
- colomiers-rugby.com

Colomiers Rugby Women is a French rugby union club, based in Colomiers. They compete in the Élite 2 competition, which is the second division of women's rugby in France.

== History ==
Colomiers Rugby established the women's team in 2015, it was composed of around twenty young players, some of whom were beginners.

In 2025, Colomiers reached the final of the Fédérale 1 championship and were defeated by Racing, they still earned promotion to the Élite 2 competition for the following season as runners-up.

== Honours ==
- Fédérale 1:
  - Runner-up: 2025

Finals played by Colomiers Rugby Women
Competition	Date	Champion	Score	Runner-up	Venue
Fédérale 1	31 May 2025	Racing 92	29–21	Colomiers / Leguevin	Auch
