= Stade Rochelais Women =

Stade Rochelais
- Ground(s): Stade Marcel-Deflandre; Plaine Des Jeux Colette Besson
- Coach: Alexandre Barès
- Captain: Charlotte Beaufils
- League: Élite 2
- 2024–25: 2nd

Official website
- www.staderochelais.com

Stade Rochelais Women is a French rugby union team, based in La Rochelle. They compete in the Élite 2 competition, which is the second division of women's rugby in France.

== History ==
They played as La Pallice Women from the 2008–09 to 2016–17 season.

In 2022, they reached their first Élite 2 championship final but lost against the Valkyries. A year later, they played against Stade Français in their second finals appearance but were defeated.

Stade Rochelais beat RC Toulon PM 30–19 to win their first Élite 2 championship in Bourgoin-Jallieu. They went on to lose to Bobigny in the Élite 1 promotion playoffs.

They met RC Toulon again in the 2024–25 season final in Auch, but were unable to retain their title and missed out on promotion to the Élite 1 competition.

== Current squad ==
2025–26 Élite 2 season squad:

Note: Flags indicate national union under World Rugby eligibility rules. Players may hold more than one non-World Rugby nationality.

Player	Position	Union
Lilou Boucharel	Hooker	France
Jeanne Crespy	Hooker	France
Camille Favre	Hooker	France
Emma Cantal Gorrochategui	Prop	France
Manon Leduc	Prop	France
Juliette Prat	Prop	France
Léa Texera	Prop	France
Clarisse Tremelo	Prop	France
Ofa Tu'ungafasi	Prop	France
Clémentine Ballereau	Lock	France
Charlotte Beaufils (c)	Lock	France
Justine Gasparoux	Lock	France
Ketsia Kamba	Lock	Canada
Marine Kazmierczak-Douet	Lock	France
Floralyne Payeur	Lock	France
Audrey Barut	Back row	France
Louane Dartinset	Back row	France
Lucie Saint Louboue	Back row	France
Anna Tortillon	Back row	France

Player	Position	Union
Nina Jacquemot	Scrum-half	Belgium
Noémie Jacquet	Scrum-half	France
Zoé Sage	Scrum-half	France
Zoé Burel	Fly-half	France
Ilona Couderchet	Fly-half	France
Camille Delteil	Centre	France
Tallis Eranossian	Centre	France
Valentine Lothooz	Centre	France
Inès Pardelinha	Centre	France
Sitti Ben Hamidou	Wing	France
Tonie Fiorese	Wing	France
Elona Guerpillon	Wing	France
Anaïck Konyi	Wing	France
Jeanne Berger du Lac	Back	France
Iris Renaudin	Back	France

== Honours ==
- Élite 2:
  - Champion (1): 2024
  - Runner-up (3): 2022, 2023, 2025
- Fédérale 1:
  - Champion (1): 2015
- Fédérale 2:
  - Runner-up (1): 2012

=== Finals results ===
Season	Competition	Champion	Score	Runner-up	Note
2024–25	Élite 2	RC Toulon PM	14–12	Stade Rochelais	
2023–24	Élite 2	Stade Rochelais	30–19	RC Toulon PM	Lost to Bobigny in Élite 1 playoff
2022–23	Élite 2	Stade Français	22–3	Stade Rochelais	
2021–22	Élite 2	Valkyries Normandie RC	8–7	Stade Rochelais	
2014–15	Fédérale 1	La Pallice	14–3	Grenoble UC Women	Promoted to Élite 2 Armelle Auclair
2011–12	Fédérale 2	Stade Poitevin	?	La Pallice	Promoted to Fédérale 1
