= Racing 92 Women =

Racing 92
- Founded: 2021; 5 years ago
- Ground: Stade Yves-du-Manoir
- League: Élite 2
- 2024–25: Fédérale 1, Champion (Promoted)

Official website
- www.racing92.fr

Racing 92 Women is a French rugby union club, based in Hauts-de-Seine. They are the women's section of Racing 92 and competes in the Élite 2 competition, which is the second division of women's rugby in France.

== History ==
The women's section of Racing 92 was formed in 2021, it was created in partnership by Racing 92 and Ovalto, a french investment group. Today, more than 90 senior female players train daily at the Stade Yves-du-Manoir in Colombes.

In 2022, Racing were beaten in the Fédérale 2 championship final by AS Granoise, they were still promoted to the Fédérale 1 competition byway of being runners-up.

In 2025, Racing won their first championship title after winning the Fédérale 1 final, and secured their promotion to Élite 2 for the next season.

== Current squad ==
Racing 92's 2025–26 Élite 2 season squad:

Note: Flags indicate national union under World Rugby eligibility rules. Players may hold more than one non-World Rugby nationality.

Player	Position	Union
Kay Bardawil	Hooker	France
Manon Fontaine	Hooker	France
Marion Novello	Hooker	France
Soline Sirieys	Hooker	France
Maeva Abderemane	Prop	France
**Katia Ambonguilat**	Prop	France
Igoudou Bamba	Prop	France
Zoé Blanco	Prop	France
Kalie Faustin	Prop	France
Eva Giblot	Prop	France
Blanche Leduc Almela	Prop	France
Khalya Sissoko	Prop	France
**Jeanne Sorrin**	Prop	Madagascar
Clémentine Brec	Lock	France
Marie Bouchardeau	Lock	France
Clothilde Cousson	Lock	France
Esther Fabre	Lock	France
Lottie Lebian	Lock	France
Aminata Niakate	Lock	France
Emma Poulat	Lock	France
Maya Rigou	Lock	France
Manon Sellini	Lock	France
Lise Serres	Lock	France
Daphné Tchicaya Mavoungou	Lock	France
Aminata Fofana	Back row	France
Odélie Galiné	Back row	France
Jennifer Normand	Back row	France
Aicha Sakhanokho	Back row	France
Candice Crochet	Back row	France
Sumaya Le Fleurier	Back row	France
Idra Abdelmoumeni	Back row	France

Player	Position	Union
Jessica Campbell	Scrum-half	Australia
Adriane Queverdo	Scrum-half	France
Clémence Navenot	Scrum-half	France
Océane Lonjaret	Scrum-half	France
Apolline Clement	Fly-half	France
**Grace Okulu**	Fly-half	Kenya
Brigitte Boquet	Centre	France
**Marie-Aurélie Castel**	Centre	France
Kedjee Domingue	Centre	France
Charlotte Franchini	Centre	France
Manon Jaunet	Centre	France
Sarah Augustin	Wing	France
Aissata Diarra	Wing	France
Armence Eker	Wing	France
Diane Estubier	Wing	France
Elisa Eugene	Wing	France
Jade Gamon	Wing	France
Mathilde Mejan	Wing	France
Charlotte Ngandu	Wing	France
Mickaela Rabaglia	Wing	France
Asma Assoumane	Fullback	France
Pauline Baron	Fullback	France
Noémie Begasse	Fullback	France

- Senior 15s internationally capped players are listed in **bold**.

== Honours ==
- Fédérale 1:
  - Champion: 2025
- Fédérale 2:
  - Runner-up: 2022

Finals played by Racing 92 Women
Competition	Date	Champion	Score	Runner-up
Fédérale 1	31 May 2025	Racing 92	29–21	Rassemblement Colomiers-Léguevin
Fédérale 2	4 June 2022	AS Granoise	17–10	Racing 92
