= Stade Villeneuvois Lille Métropole Women =

Stade Villeneuvois Lille Métropole
- Founded: 1972; 54 years ago
- President: Laura Di Muzio
- Coach: Louis Mitchell
- League: Élite 1
- 2024–25: 9th
Team kit

Official website
- www.lmrcv.fr

Stade Villeneuvois Lille Métropole Women are a French rugby union club based in Villeneuve-d'Ascq. They compete in the Élite 1 competition, which is the top division of women's rugby in France.

== History ==
Founded in 1972, the Villeneuve-d'Ascq Rugby Club was established from its inception, reflecting the development of the new town of Villeneuve-d'Ascq, and very quickly settled on a traditional pitch located next to the Lille-I University. Initially bringing together young players who had come to the North for work or studies, it soon recruited local players and competed in the local and regional championships. After a few years away from the league and somewhat inactive, it began to flourish again from 1985 onwards with the arrival of some very talented former players from Arras.

Recruiting from the sporting and academic world, accompanied by a dynamic rugby school, they steadily climbed up to the third federale division in 1998.

They have faced Montpellier four times in the championship final from 2013 to 2017, eventually winning their only title in 2016.

In 2018, a web documentary by Benjamin Montel and Antonin Boutinard Rouelle called Putain de nanas, features the players and highlights various issues of women's rugby, such as femininity in rugby or the lack of professionalization of the players.

In 2022, for its 50th anniversary, the club changed its name and became Stade Villeneuvois Lille Métropole.

They avoided relegation to Elite 2 in the 2024–2025 season against Rennes who were relegated on the final day of the season.

== Honours ==
- Élite 1:
  - Winner (1): 2016
  - Finalist (3): 2013, 2015, 2017
- Élite 2:
  - Winner (3): 1999, 2006, 2011
- French Elite Rugby Sevens Championship:
  - Winner (3): 2014, 2016, 2017
  - Finalist (1): 2015

== Finals ==
Competition	Date	Champion	Score	Runner-up	Venue
Élite 2	2006	Lille MRCV	14–9	Entente Sportive Nanterre	
Élite 2	2011	Lille MRCV	31–15	Stade Bordelais	
1st Division	1 June 2013	Montpellier HR	15–12	Lille MRCV	Stade Robert-Barran, Vierzon
Top 8	2 May 2015	Montpellier HR	17–3	Lille MRCV	Stade Marcel-Verchère, Bourg-en-Bresse
Top 8	21 May 2016	Lille MRCV	18–7	Montpellier HR	Stade Jules-Ladoumègue, Massy
Top 8	29 April 2017	Montpellier HR	17–11	Lille MRCV	Stade André Moga, Bègles
