= Stade Français Women =

Stade Français
- Founded: 2011; 15 years ago
- Ground(s): Stade Jean-Bouin, Paris
- President: Philippe Jaulin
- Coach: James Zié
- League: Élite 2
- 2024–25: 5th
1st kit	2nd kit

Official website
- www.stade.fr

Stade Français Women are a French rugby union club, based in Paris. They compete in the Élite 2 competition, which is the second division of women's rugby in France.

== History ==
The women's section of Stade Français Paris was created in 2011. In 2018, following the reorganization of the women's divisions and the expansion of the 1st division from 8 to 16 clubs, Stade Français joined the Elite 1 competition.

In 2022, the team finished last in their group and also lost their relegation match; they were then relegated to Elite 2 at the end of the season. Elite 1 was then reduced from fourteen to twelve clubs.

Stade Français won the Elite 2 championship in the 2022–2023 season and rejoined Elite 1.

At the end of the 2023–2024 season, the club was relegated again, having been beaten twice by Stade Rennais during the play-down phase.

=== Controversy ===
In May 2025, Mediapart revealed that the senior team manager had reported homophobic remarks made by the association's sporting director, Yohanne Penot. A report was also filed with the French Rugby Federation (FFR). According to his lawyer, Yohanne Penot was sanctioned by the club and apologized.

== Honours ==
First team

- Elite 2:
  - Champion (1): 2023
- Federale 1:
  - Runner-up (1): 2016

Reserve team

- Fédérale 2:
  - Runner-up (1): 2019

Sevens team

- French Rugby Sevens Championship:
  - Runner-up (1): 2016

12-a-side team

- Federale 3:
  - Runner-up (1): 2013

== International players ==
- Julie Annery
- Doriane Constanty
- Lénaïg Corson
- Coumba Diallo
- Camille Grassineau
- Assa Koïta
- Séraphine Okemba
- Chloé Pelle
- Hasna Rhamouni
