= Rugby Club Toulon Provence Méditerranée =

RC Toulon Provence Méditerranée
- Founded: 2022; 4 years ago
- Ground(s): Stade Léo-Lagrange (Toulon); Stade Guy-Môquet
- President: Jean-Pascal Montaner
- Coach: Stéphane Gamonet
- League: Élite 1
- 2024–25: Élite 2 Champions (Promoted)

Official website
- rctpm.com

Rugby Club Toulon Provence Méditerranée are a French women's rugby union club, based in Métropole Toulon Provence Méditerranée. They compete in the Élite 1 competition, which is the top division of women's rugby in France.

== History ==
=== Merger and Beginnings ===
The club was born in 2022 from the merger of the women's teams of RC Toulon, RC La Valette Le Revest La Garde Le Pradet, US Seynoise, and RC Hyères Carqueiranne La Crau.

In its first season, the club played in the Elite 2 competition, taking the place of RC La Valette Le Revest La Garde Le Pradet. Aubin Hueber, former scrum-half for RC Toulon and the French national team, was appointed project coordinator, with the objective of returning to the first division within three years. Stéphane Gamonet was general manager, coaching the team alongside Baptiste Roffinella. They finished fourth in the championship, and lost in the semi-final against Stade Rochelais. In 2023-2024, the team reached the final, where it again lost to Stade Rochelais.

In 2024–2025, the team finished top of the regular season, then won the final against Stade Rochelais. They were promoted to Elite 1 for the 2025–2026 season.

=== Élite 1 debut ===
For its first season at the highest level, the team recruited internationals Chloe Rollie of Scotland, together with Sofia Stefan and Beatrice Veronese, both from Italy.

== Honours ==
- Winners of the Elite 2 Championship in 2024–2025 season.
- Finalists of the Elite 2 Championship in 2023–2024 season.

=== Reserve Team ===
- Champions of Fédérale 2 PACA in 2024 and 2025.

== Results ==
Season	Rank	Competition	Points	P	W	D	L	Final phase
2022–2023	4th	Élite 2	68	20	13	0	7	Semi-finalists (lost 0–29 against Stade Rochelais)
2023–2024	3rd	Élite 2	66	18	13	0	5	Finalists (lost 19–30 against Stade Rochelais)
2024–2025	1st	Élite 2	78	18	16	1	1	Champions (won 14–12 against Stade Rochelais)
2025–2026	TBD	Élite 1	TBD					
