= Fédérale 1 (women's rugby) =

- Sport: Rugby union
- Founded: 2003; 23 years ago
- No. of teams: 32
- Country: France
- Most recent champion: Racing 92 (2024–25)
- Most titles: RC Jacou Montpellier Nord (2 titles)
- Level on pyramid: Level 3
- Promotion to: Élite 2
- Relegation to: Fédérale 2

Fédérale 1 is the third division of women's rugby union in France. The competition was founded in 2003, two teams are promoted to Élite 2 and four teams are relegated to Fédérale 2.

== History ==
The Fédérale 1 championship in 2014–2015 saw its format evolve with the merging of the three existing federal divisions until then into a single federal division Pratique à XV.

The reserve teams of the first division clubs participated in the competition until 2022. An Elite Reserves competition was created in 2022.

== Format ==
The competition normally involves 32 teams, it is played in two phases: a qualifying phase (four groups of eight) and a final phase. At the end of each season, two teams are promoted to Élite 2 and four teams are relegated to Fédérale 2.

=== Qualifying phase ===
The 32 teams are divided into four geographical groups of eight teams. The clubs finishing in first and second place in each group – eight teams – qualify for the play-off phase. At the end of the qualifying phase, the teams ranked last in each group are relegated to Fédérale 2.

=== Final phase ===
The final phase consists of a knockout tournament starting at the quarter-final stage. All matches are played in a single-elimination format on neutral ground. The two finalists are promoted to Elite 2. The winner of the final is crowned Fédérale 1 Champion.

== Champions ==
Season	Champion	Score	Runner-up
2001–02	Montpellier RC		
2002–03	CSM Puteaux		
2003–04	Nice Université Racing RC		
2004–05	Stade Dijonnais Côte d'Or		
2005–06	RC Lons	19–0	Rugby Nice Côte d'Azur Women
2006–07	La Valette	29–5	Avenir Fonsorbais
2007–08	RC Jacou Montpellier Nord	8–6	ES Nanterre
2008–09	RC Jacou Montpellier Nord	14–5	ES Saint-Pierre-des-Corps
2009–10	Nice Université Racing RC	15–12	AS Béziers Hérault
2010–11	Pachys d'Herm	22–13	US Nérac
2011–12	Tarbes Pyrénées Rugby	12–12	Lyon OR
2012–13	Lyon OR	29–8	Stade Olympique Villelonguet
2013–14	UA Gaillac	15–3	Castres Women's Rugby
2014–15	La Rochelle Pallice Ocean Club	14–3	Grenoble UC
2015–16	Stade Olympique Villelonguet	11–10	Stade Français
2016–17	RC Narbonne	32–13	Rueil AC
2017–18	ES Bruges Blanquefort	17–15	Stade Montois
2018–19	Montpellier RC B	12–6	Stade Toulousain B
2019–20	The FRF cancelled all amateur competitions for the 2019–20, and 2020–21 seasons due to the lockdown period following the COVID-19 pandemic.		
2020–21	The FRF cancelled all amateur competitions for the 2019–20, and 2020–21 seasons due to the lockdown period following the COVID-19 pandemic.		
2021–22	US Joué	33–10	Rass. Union bords de Marne Vitry
2022–23	CA Brive	18–6	RAS Stado TPR Ibos
2023–24	AS Bayonne	23–20	Chilly-Mazarin RC
2024–25	Racing 92	29–21	Colomiers / Leguevin
2025–26	TBD	TBD	TBD
