= Montaigut-le-Blanc, Puy-de-Dôme =

Montaigut-le-Blanc
- Commune
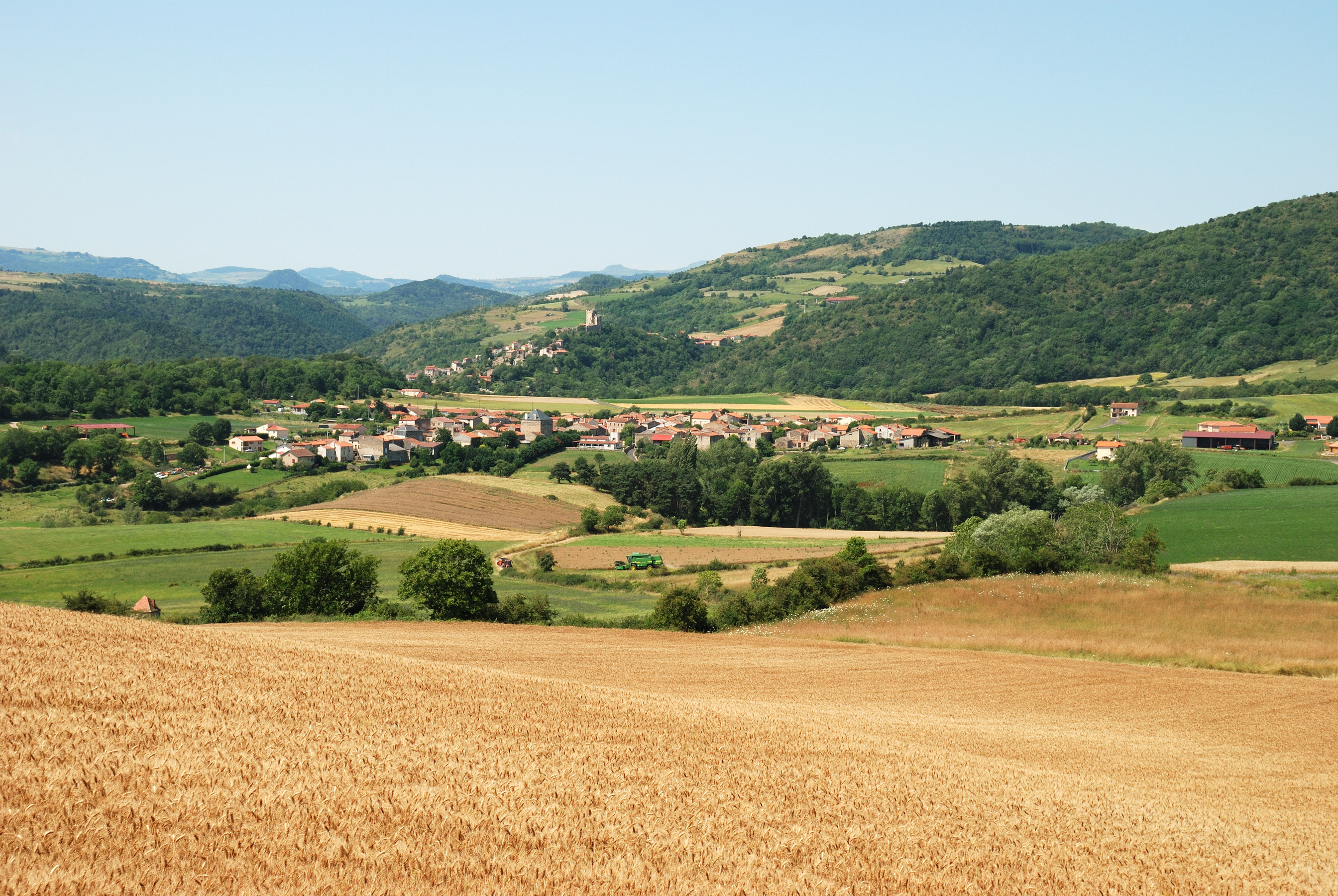
- View of the town of Montaigut-le-Blanc with the village of St. Julien in the foreground and Montaigut-le-Blanc dominated by its castle on the hill in the background

- Coat of arms
- Location of Montaigut-le-Blanc
- Location within France Location within Auvergne-Rhône-Alpes
- Coordinates: 45°35′13″N 3°05′26″E
- Country: France
- Region: Auvergne-Rhône-Alpes
- Department: Puy-de-Dôme
- Arrondissement: Issoire
- Canton: Le Sancy
- Intercommunality: Agglo Pays d'Issoire

Government
  - Mayor (2026–32): Julien Guillaume
- Area^{1}: 22.26 km^{2} (8.59 sq mi)
- Elevation: 500 m (1,600 ft)
- Highest elevation: 879 m (2,884 ft)
- Lowest elevation: 474 m (1,555 ft)
- Population (2023): 927
  - Density: 41.6/km^{2} (108/sq mi)
- Time zone: UTC+01:00 (CET)
  - Summer (DST): UTC+02:00 (CEST)
- INSEE/Postal code: 63234 /63320
- ^{1} French Land Register data, which excludes lakes, ponds, glaciers > 1 km^{2} (0.386 sq mi or 247 acres) and river estuaries.

Montaigut-le-Blanc (French pronunciation: [mɔ̃tɛɡy lə blɑ̃]; Occitan: Montagut lo Blanc) in the commune in the Puy-de-Dôme department in Auvergne in central France.

== Photogallery ==
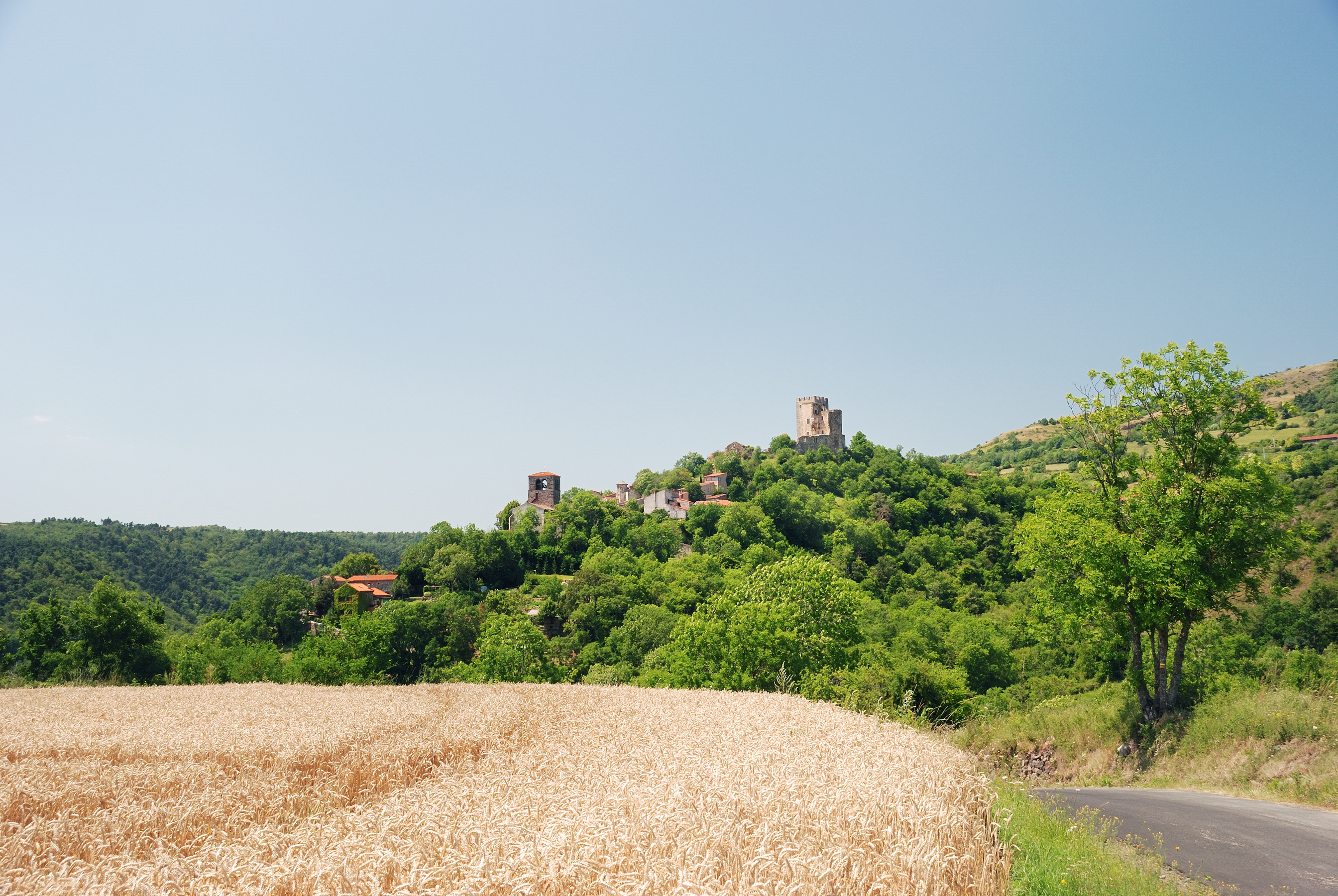
Montaigut-le-Blanc with the castle

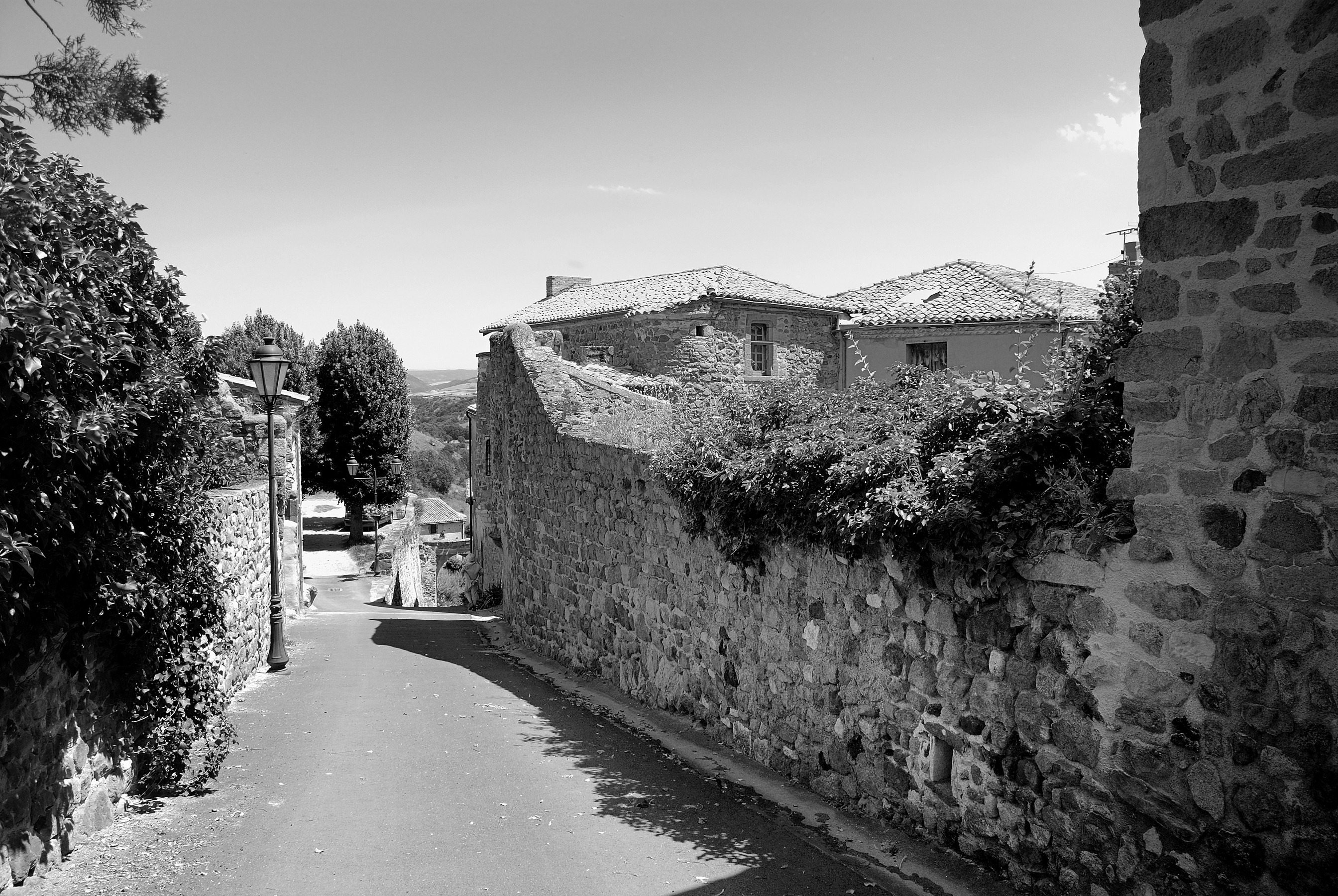
A street in the village of Montaigut-le-Blanc

== See also ==
- Communes of the Puy-de-Dôme department
