= Stade Toulousain Women =

Stade Toulousain
- Founded: 2014; 12 years ago
- Ground: Stade Ernest-Wallon
- President: Gérard Labbe
- Coach(es): Olivier Marin; Laure Bourdon Sansus; Céline Ferer
- League: Élite 1
- 2024–25: 3rd
Team kit

Official website
- www.stadetoulousain.fr

Stade Toulousain Women are a French women's rugby union club, based in Toulouse. They compete in the Élite 1 competition, which is the top division of women's rugby in France.

== History ==
The Stade Toulousain women's rugby team was formed through the merger of Avenir Fonsorbais women's rugby union club, based in Fonsorbes and which had absorbed Toulouse Fémina Sports, and the region's leading men's club, Stade Toulousain. David Gérard, a former Stade Toulousain player and coach of Avenir Fonsorbais women's rugby from 2011, played a significant role in bringing the two clubs together. From 2013 onwards, the women's team was able to use the facilities of their Toulouse neighbors.

The Stade Toulousain women's team was created in 2014 as part of a project called "Stade Toulousain Women's Rugby 2020." The goal of this project was to develop a top-level women's team within six years. This project was based on the existing Avenir Fonsorbais club, sponsored by Stade Toulousain and coached by the project's founder, David Gérard. The club comprised three women's teams at the Elite, Federal, and Under-18 Cadet levels, which were subsequently integrated into Stade Toulousain.

In their first season, Toulouse won the Elite 2 Armelle Auclair Championship, and qualified for the first division of the French Women's Rugby XV Championship, by winning the match against La Valette with a score of 27–15.

In 2015, David Gérard ended his coaching position of the women's team in order to focus on his role as coach of the Stade Toulousain U18 team, however, he still served as the club's co-president.

Stade Toulousain competed in the Top 8 for the first time in its history, during the 2015–2016 season. The team managed to qualify for the final stages of the championship in its first season.

In 2017, they were definitively integrated into the Stade Toulousain association, having previously been an independent section of the association, sharing only the name and colours; the merger was effective with the FRF on 8 July 2017. A fourth team was then created, the Under-15 Minimes.

== Current squad ==
The 2025–26 Élite 1 season squad:

Note: Flags indicate national union under World Rugby eligibility rules. Players may hold more than one non-World Rugby nationality.

Player	Position	Union
Morgane Deschamps	Hooker	France
Elina Folituu	Hooker	France
**Laure Touyé**	Hooker	France
Amalia Bazola	Prop	France
Jennifer Cros	Prop	France
Lauraly Dedy	Prop	France
Maëlia Lapoujade	Prop	France
Manon Marchesin	Prop	France
**Ambre Mwayembe**	Prop	France
Zélie Reulet	Prop	France
Cloé Correa	Lock	France
Fiona Lecat	Lock	France
**Maëlle Picut**	Lock	France
Lou Roboam	Lock	France
**Kiara Zago**	Lock	France
Brandy Cazorla	Back row	France
Isis Espuga	Back row	Andorra
**Gaëlle Hermet**	Back row	France
Inès Lawani	Back row	France
Anaïs Peralez	Back row	France
**Charlotte Escudero**	Number 8	France
Zoé Jean	Number 8	France
Eva Tougne	Number 8	France

Player	Position	Union
**Océane Bordes**	Scrum-half	France
**Pauline Bourdon Sansus**	Scrum-half	France
Lylou Pédussaud	Scrum-half	France
Charlie Gauyat	Fly-half	France
**Lina Queyroi**	Fly-half	France
Martina Serrano García	Fly-half	Spain
Lou Baguette	Centre	France
Lili Dezou	Centre	France
**Maëlle Filopon**	Centre	France
Mia Moussac-Bouttier	Centre	France
Emma Pasin	Centre	France
Aëlig Trégouët	Centre	France
**Kelly Arbey**	Wing	France
**Iän Jason**	Wing	France
Marie Lefrançois	Wing	France
**Léa Murie**	Wing	France
Alessia Philippe	Wing	Switzerland
**Amàlia Argudo**	Fullback	Spain
Pauline Barrat	Fullback	France

- Senior 15s internationally capped players are listed in **bold**.

== Honours ==
- French First Division Championship:
  - Winner (1): 2022
  - Finalist (2): 2018, 2019
- French Elite 2 Championship Armelle Auclair:
  - Winner: 2015
- French Women's Championship, 1st Federal Division:
  - Finalist: 2019 (reserve team)
- French Elite Rugby Sevens Championship:
  - Winner (1): 2019
- French Rugby Union Cup:
  - Winner (2): 2022, 2024
- French Under-18 Championship:
  - Winner: 2025

=== Finals ===
List of finals played by Stade Toulousain
Competition	Date	Champion	Score	Runner-up	Venue
Elite 2 Armelle Auclair	3 May 2015	Stade Toulousain	16–13	AS Bayonne	Bouque Stadium, Mazères-sur-Salat
Top 8	13 May 2018	Montpellier HR	15–12	Stade Toulousain	Stade Albert Domec, Carcassonne
Federal 1	18 May 2019	Montpellier HR (reserve)	12–6	Stade Toulousain (reserve team)	Stade Jean-Larrouy, Laloubère
Élite 1	18 May 2019	Montpellier HR	22–13	Stade Toulousain	Maurice-Trélut Stadium, Tarbes
French Cup	24 April 2022	Stade Toulousain	13–5	AC Bobigny 93	Stade des Pérouses, Romagnat
Élite 1	4 June 2022	Stade Toulousain	16–10	Blagnac RF	Stade Lesdiguières, Grenoble

== Players ==
=== Notable players ===
- Maïlys Dhia Traoré
- Gaëlle Hermet
- Fiona Lecat
- Marion Peyronnet
- Morgane Peyronnet
- Laure Sansus

=== Captains ===
Term	Captain
2014–2017	Marion Peyronnet
2017–2021	Roxane Bilon
2021–2024	Gaëlle Hermet
2024–	Lou Roboam

== Coaches ==
Season	Coach	Assistants
2014–2015	David Gérard	Nathalie Feucher; Cyril Balester
2015–December 2016	Pierre Marty (forwards); Philippe Gleyze (backs)	—
January 2017–2018	Pierre Marty (forwards); Anthony Granja (backs)	—
2018–2021	Anthony Granja	Pascal Belaubre
2021–2023	Olivier Marin	Pascal Belaubre (forwards); Rémi Favre (backs)
2023–	Olivier Marin	Céline Ferrer (forwards); Laure Sansus (backs)
