= Lyon OU Rugby Women =

LOU Rugby
- Founded: 2008; 18 years ago
- Ground: Plaine des Jeux de Gerland
- President: Didier Deal; Jean-Philippe Hager
- Coach: Jean-Matthieu Alcalde
- League: Élite 1
- 2024–25: 8th
Team kit	2nd kit

Official website
- www.lourugby.fr

Lyon OU Rugby Women are a French rugby union club based in Lyon. They compete in the Élite 1 competition, which is the top division of women's rugby in France.

== History ==
The women's section of Lyon Olympique Universitaire Rugby was formed in 2008. During the 2011–2012 season, they remained undefeated all season in Fédérale 1, but a missed penalty kick in the final cost them the title and promotion to the next division.

In 2013, they won the Fédérale 1 championship and in 2016, they were crowned runners-up in the Elite 2 championship.

In 2019, they were French Elite 2 champions and gained access to Elite 1, the first division of French women's rugby.

For the 2019–2020 season, the first team plays in Elite 1, while the reserve team plays in Fédérale 1.

In 2025, French insurance giant, Matmut, became the sponsor's of the women's section as well as the men's.

== Current squad ==
Lyon's 2025–26 Élite 1 season squad:

Note: Flags indicate national union under World Rugby eligibility rules. Players may hold more than one non-World Rugby nationality.

Player	Position	Union
Lyna Abdallah	Hooker	France
Margaux Jeannin	Hooker	France
Eugénie Palisser	Hooker	France
Clarisse Clainholphe	Prop	France
**Alexandra Correia**	Prop	Switzerland
**Sarah Exnerova**	Prop	(Czech Republic) Czech Republic
**Eider García**	Prop	Spain
Anaïs Gardet	Prop	France
Manon Leduc	Prop	France
Solenne Mpari	Prop	France
Maude Cournut	Lock	France
Alicia Cravotta	Lock	France
Camille Jeannin	Lock	France
Clémentine Joliveau	Lock	France
Lucille Palisser	Lock	France
**Kassandra Sylla**	Lock	Spain
Lauryne Cheze	Back row	France
Jade Clareton	Back row	France
Victoire Foulon	Back row	France
**Marie Morland**	Back row	France

Player	Position	Union
Alizée Fouré	Scrum-half	France
Eneka Labeyrie	Scrum-half	France
Chloé Ponthus	Scrum-half	France
Noa Coudre	Fly-half	France
Cléo Hagel	Fly-half	France
Garance Merle	Fly-half	France
**Lucy Attwood**	Centre	England
Fanny Dumarty	Centre	France
Lilou Graciet	Centre	France
**Chloé Jacquet**	Centre	France
Noelia Pauls	Centre	Andorra
Charlotte Rufas	Centre	France
Léa Trollier	Centre	France
Elodie Galinier	Wing	Australia
**Séraphine Okemba**	Wing	France
Aminata Samadoulougou	Wing	France
Sacha Beltran	Fullback	France

- Senior 15s internationally capped players are listed in **bold**.

== Honours ==
- Elite 2:
  - Winner (1): 2019
  - Runner-up (1): 2016
- Federale 1:
  - Winner (1): 2013
  - Runner-up (1): 2012

== Finals ==
Competition	Date	Champion	Score	Runner-up	Venue
Federale 1	20 May 2012	Tarbes Pyrénées Rugby	12–12	Lyon OU	Stade de la Méditerranée, Béziers
Federale 1	19 May 2013	Lyon OU	29–8	SO Villelonguet	Valréas
Elite 2	22 May 2016	ASM Romagnat	29–7	Lyon OU	Unieux
Elite 2	18 May 2019	Lyon OU	22–8	RC Chilly-Mazarin	Stade Maurice Trélut, Tarbes

== Coaches ==
Years	Manager	Assistants
2018–2021	Philippe Buffevant	Jean-Pierre Husson; Paul Hugonnier
2021–2023	Jean-Matthieu Alcalde	—
2023–Present	Jean-Matthieu Alcalde	David Attoub (Forwards)
