= Stade Sabathé =

Sports arena in Montpellier, France

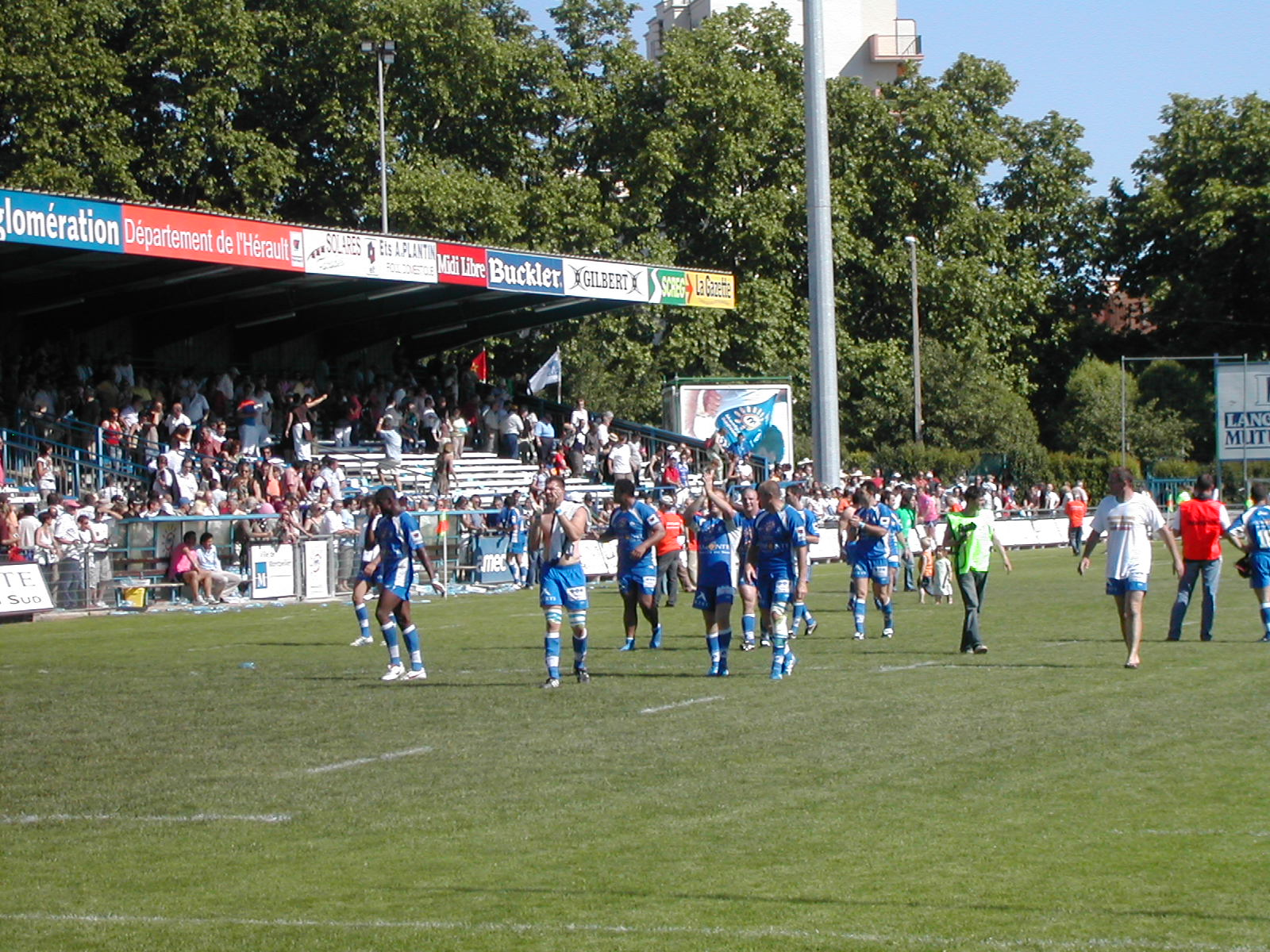
- Victory lap of the Montpellier RC players after the final game of the 2005-2006 season at the Stade Sabathé
- Interactive map of Stade Sabathé
- Full name: Stade Jean Sabathé
- Location: Montpellier, France
- Coordinates: 43°35′53″N 3°52′11″E
- Owner: Montpellier Agglomération
- Capacity: 6,500
- Surface: artificial
- Field size: 100 m x 70 m

Construction
- Opened: 1930

Tenants
- Montpellier Red Devils; Montpellier RC (until 2007)

Stade Sabathé is a multi-use stadium in Montpellier, France. It is currently used mostly for rugby union and rugby league matches and is the home stadium of Montpellier Red Devils. Until 2007 it was the home stadium of Montpellier RC. The stadium is able to hold 6,500 people.

In 2023 a new artificial surface was installed.
