= Stade Rennais Rugby =

- Founded: 1999; 27 years ago
- Ground: Stade du Commandant Bougouin
- President: Anne-Sophie Demoulin
- Coach: Hugo Mattes
- League: Élite 2
- 2024–25: Élite 1, 10th (Relegated to Élite 2)
Team kit

Official website
- www.staderennaisrugby.fr

Stade Rennais Rugby are a French women's rugby union team, based in Rennes. They compete in the Élite 2 competition, which is the second division of women's rugby in France.

The club has five other representative teams: The Elite Reserve team, the Sevens team (In Extenso SuperSevens), the Elite Under-18s (French sevens and XVs Championship) and two Touch Rugby teams.

== History ==
=== Birth of the club ===
The club was founded on 25 August 1999 at the initiative of a triumvirate composed of Lionel Brouder, founding president, Philippe Morant and Yann Moison. The building of the club was initially based on the establishment of a rugby school located then in the Cleunay district, in the heart of the city of Rennes, near the Yves-Montand square.

In 2001–2002, the first team, undefeated in the regular season, qualified for the semi-finals of the French Second Division Championship and was promoted to Group B of the Elite First Division. In 2003–2004, the team finished second in Group B of the Elite First Division and lost in the final of the Armelle-Auclair Challenge Cup against Bruges Blanquefort. In 2005, the team reached the final of the Armelle-Auclair Challenge Cup again, but lost to Montpellier 14–11. They were nevertheless promoted to the Elite First Division.

=== The Top 8 ===
In their first season in the first division, Stade Rennais reached the elite final, but lost in the final against the Catalans of Toulouges 3–8.

In 2010–2011, Stade Rennais finished second in the Top 10, the club's best regular season result, and won their playoff semi-final against Montpellier 20–13, after a run of three defeats at this stage against the same club. They then faced Perpignan (formerly USAT XV Toulouges) in the final. As in 2005–2006, the Rennes women were defeated by the Catalan side 11–15.

In 2025, the first team was relegated from the first to the second division.

== Honours ==
- French Rugby Union Championship:
  - Runner-up: 2006 and 2011
- Elite 2 Armelle-Auclair:
  - Finalist: 2004 and 2005
- French Women's Elite Rugby Sevens Championship:
  - Finalist (1): 2019
- French Reserve Team Championship:
  - Champion: 2015 and 2016

=== Finals results ===
List of finals played by Stade Rennais Rugby
Competition	Date	Champion	Score	Runner-up	Venue
2nd Division	2004	ESP Bruges Blanquefort		Stade Rennais	
2nd Division	2005	Montpellier RC	14–11	Stade Rennais	
1st Division	2006	USA Toulouges XV	8–3	Stade Rennais	La Roche-sur-Yon
1st Division	19 June 2011	USAP Women's XV	15–11	Stade Rennais	Saint-Médard-en-Jalles

== International players ==
- (France) Sandrine Agricole
- (France) Arkya Aït Lahbib
- (France) Céline Allainmat
- (France) Violaine Aubrée
- (France) Camille Boudaud
- (France) Claire Canal
- (France) Lucie Canal
- (France) Marie-Aurélie Castel
- (France) Lénaïg Corson
- (France) Emilie Courtois
- (France) Aurélie Cousseau
- (France) Aline D'Hooge
- (France) Caroline Drouin
- (France) Margaux Ducès
- (France) Lucie Élodie
- (France) Hélène Ezanno
- (France) Perrine Fagnen
- (France) Lucille Godiveau
- (France) Marie-Charlotte Hebel
- (France) Lénaïck Lorre
- (France) Valentine Lothoz
- (France) Rosa Marcé
- (France) Clémence Ollivier
- (France) Elisa Riffonneau
- (France) Suliana Sivi
- (France) Jessy Trémoulière
- (France) Jade Ulutule
- (France) Yolaine Yengo
- (Fiji) Litia Naiqato
- (Fiji) Luisa Tisolo
- (Republic of Ireland) Theresa Nolan
- (Italy) Ilaria Arrighetti
- (Italy) Melissa Bettoni
- (Italy) Awa Coulibaly
- (Italy) Marta Ferrari
- (Italy) Lucia Gai
- (Italy) Sofia Stefan
- (Italy) Cecilia Zublena
- (Norway) Elisabeth Lohre
- (Portugal) Isabel Ozorio
- (Spain) Alba Capell
- (Spain) Meritxell Carreras Gruart
- (Spain) Monica Castelo Mejuto

== Coaches ==
Season	Coach	Assistants
1999–2008	Yann Moison	
1999–2012	Philippe Morant	
2009–2012	Philippe Morant	Julien Marie
2012–2013	Charles Moulec	
2013–2014	Charles Moulec	Guirec Le Guillou
2014–2015	Philippe Lansade	Vincent Herbst (Forwards); Sandrine Agricole (Backs)
2015–2016	Sandrine Agricole	Kevin Courties (Forwards)
2016–2017	Vincent Brehonnet	Vincent Herbst (Forwards); Sandrine Agricole (Backs)
2017–2018	Vincent Brehonnet	Vincent Herbst (Forwards)
2018–2020	Vincent Brehonnet	Anne Berville (Forwards)
2020–2021	Vincent Brehonnet	Anne Berville (Forwards); Céline Allainmat (Backs)
2021–2022	Anne Berville	Céline Allainmat (Backs)
2022–2024	Anne Berville	Arnaud Le Berre (Backs)
2024–2025	Arnaud Le Berre	Hugo Mattes (Forwards); Vincent Brehonnet
2025–Present	Hugo Mattes	Julien Gomez (Forwards); Melissa Bettoni (Scrum); Vincent Brehonnet
