= AC Bobigny 93 Rugby Women =

AC Bobigny 93 Rugby
- Founded: 2003; 23 years ago
- Ground: Stade Henri Wallon
- President: Alain Chamois
- Coach: Clémence Gueucier
- League: Élite 1
- 2024–25: 6th
Team kit

Official website
- acbobigny93rugby.ffr.fr

AC Bobigny 93 Rugby Women are a French rugby union club, based in Bobigny. They compete in the Élite 1 competition, which is the top division of women's rugby in France.

== History ==
The AC Bobigny 93 Rugby women's section was founded in 2003. Their only appearance in the championship final in 2014, ended in defeat to Montpellier.

Bobigny were second to last in their group in 2024, they had to play in the relegation playoffs. They were defeated in the second round by Stade Rennais, and had to play in the promotion/relegation playoff against Stade Rochelais, the Elite 2 champions. AC Bobigny won 26–6 and remained in Elite 1.

Bobigny won the first women's Supersevens during the 2024–2025 season.

In December 2025, the coaching staff led by Clémence Gueucier received the Étoile staff trophy at the Étoiles ceremony organized by the Sud Ouest newspaper.

== Honours ==
- French First Division Championship:
  - Finalist: 2014
- French 2nd Division Championship:
  - Finalist: 2009
- French 3rd Division Championship:
  - Finalist: 2004
- French Federal 2 Championship:
  - Finalist: 2011
- French Elite Women's Rugby Sevens Championship:
  - Champion: 2013, 2015
  - Finalist: 2016
- Supersevens:
  - Winner: 2025
- French Cup X:
  - Winner: 2019
- French Women's Rugby Union Cup:
  - Finalist: 2022 and 2023

== Results ==
Date	Champion	Score	Runner-up	Venue
27 April 2014	Montpellier HR	29–19	AC Bobigny 93 Rugby	Stade de l'Escale, Arnas

== Notable players ==
- Sandrine Agricole
- Aïda Ba
- Fanny Griselin
- Pauline Biscarat
- Caroline Ladagnous
- Julie Annery
- Marion Lièvre
- Madoussou Fall
- Clémence Gueucier
- Coumba Diallo
- Assa Koïta
- Anne-Cécile Ciofani
- Nassira Konde
- Joanna Grisez

== Coaches ==
Years	Coach	Assistants
2003–2017	Fabien Antonelli	
2017–2023	Alexandre Gau	Nicolas Boukaya; Vincent Boirit-Grillot
2023–Present	Clémence Gueucier	
