= Montpellier Hérault Rugby Women =

Montpellier Hérault Rugby
- Founded: 1999; 27 years ago
- Ground: Stade Sabathé
- Coach: Stéphane Ferrière
- League: Élite 1
- 2024–25: 7th
1st kit	2nd kit

Official website
- www.montpellier-rugby.com

Montpellier Hérault Rugby Women are a French women's rugby union club. They are based in Montpellier and compete in Élite 1, which is the top division competition for women's rugby in France.

== History ==
The Montpellier Rugby Club's senior women's team was formed in 1998. The team won its first national title in 2007 with a 10–3 victory in the final against Ovalie Caennaise in Grenoble. Over time, they have won numerous titles (2009, 2013, 2014).

Montpellier are the second most successful women's team in France, behind Toulouse. Their victory in the 2019 French Championship final was the last time they won a title.

== Current squad ==
2025–26 Élite 1 season squad:

Note: Flags indicate national union under World Rugby eligibility rules. Players may hold more than one non-World Rugby nationality.

Player	Position	Union
Maëlle Huiban	Hooker	France
Eva Mazzochi	Hooker	France
Lila Tajouri	Hooker	France
**Rkhya Aït-Lhabib**	Prop	France
**Rose Bernadou**	Prop	France
Paloma Bruna	Prop	France
Alicia Masquer	Prop	France
Ludmila Ripault	Prop	France
Emily Clark	Lock	Canada
Capucine Pardie	Lock	France
Solène Besset	Back row	France
Léa Chazalette	Back row	France
Agathe Ducret	Back row	France
**Giada Franco**	Back row	Italy
Lola Laurent	Back row	France
Meg Mambé	Back row	France
**Rachel McLachlan**	Back row	Scotland
Fanny Morel	Back row	France
Ilona Segonds	Back row	France
Eva Tondé	Back row	France

Player	Position	Union
Anna De Almeida	Scrum-half	France
Flavie Gros	Scrum-half	France
Prune Pégot	Scrum-half	France
Maë Levy	Fly-half	France
**Morgane Peyronnet**	Fly-half	France
Marine Bérenger	Centre	France
**Giada Corradini**	Centre	Italy
Louen Laramy	Centre	France
Anna Macipe	Centre	France
Holly McIntyre	Centre	Scotland
**Suliana Sivi**	Centre	France
**Cyrielle Banet**	Wing	France
Lilou Cozar	Wing	France
Maya Grat	Wing	France
Lolita Ivars	Wing	France
Flavie Richaume	Wing	France
Céane Viala	Wing	France
Emy Baudru	Fullback	France
**Caroline Boujard**	Fullback	France

- Senior 15s internationally capped players are listed in **bold**.

== Honours ==
- Women's Clubs European Cup (1):
  - Winner (1): 2008
- French First Division Championship:
  - Champion (8): 2007, 2009, 2013, 2014, 2015, 2017, 2018, 2019
  - Finalist (4): 2008, 2010, 2012, 2016
- French Elite Rugby Sevens Championship:
  - Runner-up (1): 2017
- French 2nd division Championship:
  - Champion (1): 2005
- French 3rd division Championship:
  - Champion (2): 2002, 2019 (reserve)
- French 4th division Championship:
  - Champion (1): 2014 (reserve)

== Results ==
Date	Champions	Score	Runner-up	Venue
24 June 2007	Montpellier RC	10–3	Caen Rugby	Grenoble
2008	USAT XV Toulouges	18–15	Montpellier RC	Narbonne
20 June 2009	Montpellier RC	19–16	USAT XV Toulouges	Gruissan
29 May 2010	USAT XV Toulouges	26–5	Montpellier RC	Stade Jean-Bouin, Paris
10 June 2012	RC Lons	14–10	Montpellier RC	Stade de Loudes, L'Union
1 June 2013	Montpellier RC	15–12	Lille MRCV	Stade Robert Barran, Vierzon
27 April 2014	Montpellier RC	29–19	AC Bobigny 93	Stade de l'escale, Arnas
2 May 2015	Montpellier RC	17–3	Lille MRCV	Stade Marcel-Verchère, Bourg-en-Bresse
21 May 2016	Lille MRCV	18–7	Montpellier RC	Stade Jules-Ladoumègue, Massy
29 April 2017	Montpellier RC	17–11	Lille MRCV	Stade André Moga, Bègles
13 May 2018	Montpellier RC	15–12	Stade Toulousain	Stade Albert Domec, Carcassonne
18 May 2019	Montpellier RC	22–13	Stade Toulousain	Stade Maurice Trélut, Tarbes

== Notable players ==
- Montserrat Amédée
- Aurélie Bailon
- Cyrielle Banet
- Caroline Boujard
- Marine De Nadaï
- Koumiba Djossouvi
- Clotilde Flaugère
- Émeline Gros
- Marine Ménager
- Romane Ménager
- Gaëlle Mignot
- Safi N'Diaye
- Morgane Peyronnet
- Elodie Portaries
- Élodie Poublan
- Agathe Sochat
- Jennifer Troncy
- Aurélie Vernhet

== Coaches ==
Years	Coach	Assistants
?–2015	Claude Boudier	Pascal Penaud
2015–21	Olivier Clessienne	Patrick Raffy (Backs)
2021–22	Patrick Raffy	David Theillet (Forwards)
2022–23	Stéphane Ferrière	Armand Mardon (Forwards)
2023–24	Armand Mardon	Cyril Bouladou (Backs)
2024–25	Armand Mardon	Cyril Bouladou (Backs), Alex Tulou (Forwards)
2025–	Stéphane Ferrière	Jennifer Troncy (Backs)
