= Élite 1 =

French women's rugby union national league

Axa Élite 1
- Current season, competition or edition: 2025–26 Élite 1 season
- Formerly: Top 8 (2015–2018)
- Sport: Rugby union
- Founded: 1971; 55 years ago
- First season: 1972
- No. of teams: 10
- Country: France
- Most recent champion: Stade Bordelais (2025)
- Most titles: Toulouse Femina Sports (9)
- Level on pyramid: Level 1
- Relegation to: Élite 2 Féminine
- Website: Élite 1

Élite 1 Féminine (since 2018, known as Axa Élite 1 for sponsorship reasons) is the top national league for women's rugby union clubs in France. It was founded from the 1971–1972 season under the aegis of the French Women's Rugby Association before being taken over by the French Women's Rugby Federation, it has been organized by the French Rugby Federation since 1989. The first season was won by the ASVEL Rugby women's team.

Ten teams play each other in a double round robin, with 4 teams qualifying for the final phase, and 1 team being relegated to Élite 2.

As with the men's competition, the most successful club in France was Toulouse Fémina Sports, they subsequently merged with Avenir Fonsorbais women's rugby union club in 2014 and became Stade Toulousain Women. They have won nine French championship titles, in 1975, 1976, 1977, 1978, 1979, 1980, 1982, 1984 and 1985. Montpellier RC is the second most successful team with eight titles (2007, 2010, 2013, 2014, 2015, 2017, 2018 and 2019).

ASM Romagnat won the Élite 1 title in 2021. Stade Bordelais are the most recent champions, winning three consecutive titles (2023, 2024, 2025).

== History ==
=== Birth of women's rugby in France ===
Having appeared occasionally in France between 1908 and 1924, women's rugby was permanently established in France in 1965 thanks to young high school and university students.

The first official French women's rugby club was Violettes Bressanes, founded in 1966 under the leadership of Andrée Forestier, followed by Coquelicots de Tournus the following year and Toulouse Fémina Sports the year after. Leaders of these pioneering clubs came together and created the French Women's Rugby Association. The first championship took place in 1972, and ASVEL Villeurbanne became the first champion, defeating RC Adour 10–8 in the final.

From 1984, the championship was organised with the approval of the Ministry of Sports. It subsequently came under the control of the French Rugby Federation from the 1989–1990 season.

=== Modern era ===
In 2014, the French Rugby Federation (FRF) launched a major reform of women's rugby in France, causing anger among club officials and players who had not being consulted beforehand. The new championship saw a reduction in the number of elite clubs from 10 to 8. The championship was thus renamed the Top 8. A few days before the 2014–2015 championship final, the FRF unveiled the competition's first logo, which was created to strengthen its identity and visibility. Additionally, the final was broadcast live on television for the first time, with Montpellier Rugby Club defeating Lille Métropole RC Villeneuve 17–3. This allowed Montpellier to achieve a three-peat less than 10 years after Toulouges' victory, leaving the northern club disappointed, just as they had been two years earlier.

In 2018, the FRF reformed the women's competitions again. Four levels of competition were created, with a new format for the Women's First Division, combining the 8 teams playing in the Top 8 for the 2017–2018 season and the 8 teams that qualified for the Elite 2 Armelle-Auclair quarter-finals for the 2017–2018 season. The championship then changed its name to "Elite 1".

In 2020, the championship was interrupted mid-season due to the COVID-19 pandemic sweeping across Europe. For the first time since 1972, the French championship title was not awarded. No club's were relegated at the end of the season, although Ovalie Caennaise who were last in their pool, requested relegation in order to rebuild within the second division, thus giving its place to Rugby Club La Valette Le Revest La Garde Le Pradet, who were first in Elite 2. The 2020–2021 championship featured the sixteen teams in a new format consisting of 4 pools of 4 teams with play-offs, play-downs, and a final phase.

In the early 2020s, Elite 1 was a two-tiered competition, with professional and amateur players competing side-by-side. French internationals, paid by the federation, were concentrated in about half a dozen clubs, creating a significant disparity between "big clubs" and "small clubs." In the fall of 2021, the competition format was reduced from 16 to 14 teams, then to 12 teams in the fall of 2022, and finally to 10 teams in the fall of 2024, according to the plans of Brigitte Jugla, the Federation's vice-president in charge of women's rugby. It was during this period that two teams withdrew from the competition altogether: AS Bayonne in the 2021–2022 season, and Rugby Club Chilly-Mazarin in the 2022–2023 season. Compared to the English championship, the French championship lacked the financial support of an important partner.

On 24 February 2024, ASM Romagnat faced the reigning champions, Stade Bordelais (27–31), in front of 6,025 spectators, setting an attendance record for the competition during its regular season. The record was broken a week later during the match between Stade Toulousain and Blagnac, which drew 6,397 spectators to the Stade Ernest-Wallon.

=== 2024: Revised format ===
For the 2024–2025 season, the competition format was revised: the championship reverted to a single pool, and the elite division was reduced from twelve to ten teams. Furthermore, to mitigate the imbalance caused by the concentration of international players in a handful of clubs, and to discourage clubs from recruiting international players, the federation deliberately scheduled overlapping matches. Thus, two matchdays took place during the 2024 WXV tournament, and two others during the Women's Six Nations Championship. On 2 November, for the first time, an Elite 1 match was broadcast live on Canal+, ASM Romagnat hosted Stade Bordelais in front of 12,500 spectators, setting a new attendance record for the competition.

Before the start of the 2025–2026 season, the FRF signed a naming rights contract with Axa for three years; the "Women's Elite 1" was then designated as "Axa Elite 1".

== Format ==
The championship used to take place in two phases: a so-called qualification phase, which is contested by all the teams, and a final phase which is played by direct elimination. From 2015 to 2018, the championship is referred to as the Top 8. From 2018 to 2024, the championship went from a single pool of 8 clubs to two pools of 16, with the 8 best clubs qualifying for the final phase; meanwhile two clubs would be relegated to Élite 2 at the end of the championship.

Beginning with the 2024–25 season, the format returned to a single pool of ten, playing in a double round robin, with 4 teams qualifying for the final phase, and 1 team being relegated to Élite 2. This ensured that the top teams would play each other more frequently, and the FRF believes will improve results for the national team Les Bleues.

== Teams ==
2025–26 Élite 1 season teams:

Club	Stadium	Capacity
Blagnac SCR	Stade Ernest-Argelès	4,000
AC Bobigny 93	Henri-Wallon Stadium	1,000
Stade Bordelais	Stade Sainte-Germaine / Stade Chaban-Delmas	N/A / 34,462
FC Grenoble Amazones	Stade Lesdiguières	12,650
Lyon OUR	Plaine des Jeux de Gerland	N/A
ASM Romagnat	Stade des Pérouses	500
Montpellier HR	Stade Sabathé	6,500
RC Toulon PM	Stade Victor Marquet	1,000
Stade Toulousain	Stade Ernest-Wallon	19,500
Stade Villeneuvois LM	Stade Emmanuel-Thery	N/A

Location of teams in the 2025–26 Élite 1 season

== Champions ==
=== 1970–79 ===
Season	(gold) Champion	Score	(silver) Runner-up	Venue	Attendance	Ref
1972	ASVEL	10–8	RC Adour	Lombez		
1973	FC Auch	10–8	Tarbes Rugby	Morlaàs		
1974	Violettes bressanes	25–10	FC Auch	La Voulte		
1975	Toulouse Fémina Sports	18–3	OF Valence Les Dragons Blancs	Romagnat		
1976	Toulouse Fémina Sports	8–3	Violettes bressanes	Castres		
1977	Toulouse Fémina Sports	12–7	Violettes bressanes	Montaigut-le-Blanc		
1978	Toulouse Fémina Sports	7–0	FC Auch	Montaigut-le-Blanc		
1979	Toulouse Fémina Sports	19–0	Coquelicots de Tournus	Montaigut-le-Blanc		

=== 1980–89 ===
Season	(gold) Champion	Score	(silver) Runner-up	Venue	Attendance	Ref
1980	Toulouse Fémina Sports	7–0	Violettes bressanes	Montaigut-le-Blanc		
1981	Violettes bressanes	10–3	Coquelicots de Tournus	Montaigut-le-Blanc		
1982	Toulouse Fémina Sports	7–0	Violettes bressanes	Montaigut-le-Blanc		
1983	La Teste Rugby	10–0	Violettes bressanes	Tulle		
1984	Toulouse Fémina Sports	10–0	Coquelicots de Tournus	Privas		
1985	Toulouse Fémina Sports	6–0	Violettes bressanes	Montaigut-le-Blanc		
1986	La Teste Rugby	8–0	Toulouse Fémina Sports			
1987	La Teste Rugby	16–4	Coquelicots de Tournus	Bègles		
1988	La Teste Rugby	8–0	Violettes bressanes	Anglet		
1989	Violettes bressanes	19–12	AS Romagnat	Montaigut-le-Blanc		

=== 1990–99 ===
Season	(gold) Champion	Score	(silver) Runner-up	Venue	Attendance	Ref
1990	Saint-Orens	7–6	Violettes bressanes	Tours		
1991	Rugby Club de Chilly-Mazarin	3–0	Saint-Orens	Saint-Yrieix-la-Perche		
1992	Pachys d'Herm	10–3	Saint-Orens	Marciac		
1993	Saint-Orens	13–3	Violettes bressanes	L'Isle-sur-la-Sorgue		
1994	AS Romagnat	21–12	Saint-Orens	Maurs		
1995	AS Romagnat	10–6	Pachys d'Herm			
1996	Rugby Club de Chilly-Mazarin	3–0	AS Romagnat	Romorantin		
1997	Pachys d'Herm	30–17	Saint-Orens	Stade Jean-Bouin, Paris		
1998	Pachys d'Herm	20–11	AS Romagnat	Mussidan		
1999	Caen Rugby Club	25–12	Pachys d'Herm	Leucate		

=== 2000–09 ===
Season	(gold) Champion	Score	(silver) Runner-up	Venue	Attendance	Ref
2000	Caen Rugby Club	12–5	Pachys d'Herm	Poitiers		
2001	Pachys d'Herm	20–19	Caen Rugby Club	Limoges		
2002	Caen Rugby Club	10–3	Saint-Orens	Tyrosse		
2003	Pachys d'Herm	23–15	Caen Rugby Club	Parthenay		
2004	USAT XV Toulouges	8–6	Ovalie caennaise	Isle		
2005	USAT XV Toulouges	7–3	Ovalie caennaise	Stade de France, Saint-Denis		
2006	USAT XV Toulouges	8–3	Stade Rennais rugby	La Roche-sur-Yon		
2007	Montpellier RC	10–3	Ovalie caennaise	Grenoble		
2008	USAT XV Toulouges	18–15	Montpellier RC	Narbonne		
2009	Montpellier RC	19–16	USAP XV Féminin	Gruissan		

=== 2010–19 ===
Season	(gold) Champion	Score	(silver) Runner-up	Venue	Attendance	Ref
2010	USAP XV Féminin	26–5	Montpellier RC	Stade Jean Bouin, Paris		
2011	USAP XV Féminin	15–11	Stade rennais rugby	Saint-Médard-en-Jalles	1,200	
2012	Rugby Club Lonsois	14–10	Montpellier RC	Stade de Loudes, L'Union		
2013	Montpellier RC	15–12	Lille MRC Villeneuvois	Stade Robert-Barran, Vierzon		
2014	Montpellier RC	29–19	AC Bobigny 93 Rugby	Stade de l'Escale, Arnas		
Top 8						
2015	Montpellier RC	17–3	Lille MRC Villeneuvois	Stade Marcel-Verchère, Bourg-en-Bresse		
2016	Lille MRC Villeneuvois	18–7	Montpellier RC	Stade Jules-Ladoumègue, Massy		
2017	Montpellier RC	17–11	Lille MRC Villeneuvois	Stade André-Moga, Bègles	1,500	
2018	Montpellier RC	15–12	Stade Toulousain	Stade Albert-Domec, Carcassonne		
Élite 1						
2019	Montpellier RC	22–13	Stade Toulousain	Stade Maurice-Trélut, Tarbes		

=== 2020–29 ===
Season	(gold) Champion	Score	(silver) Runner-up	Venue	Attendance	Ref	Highlights
2020	Season interrupted by COVID-19						
2021	ASM Romagnat	13–8	Blagnac	Stade Ernest-Argelès, Blagnac	1,000		
2022	Stade Toulousain	16–10	Blagnac	Stade Lesdiguières, Grenoble			
2023	Stade Bordelais	27–23	Blagnac	Stade Sainte-Germaine			
2024	Stade Bordelais	32–17	ASM Romagnat	Stade Pierre Rajon Bourgoin-Jallieu			
2025	Stade Bordelais	32–24	Stade Toulousain	Stade Marcel-Michelin			
2026	Stade Bordelais	22-10	ASM Romagnat				
2027							
2028							
2029							

== Winners and runners up ==
- Current Élite 1 Féminine participating clubs indicated in bold

Club	Wins	Runners-up	Winning Seasons	Last win
Toulouse Fémina Sports	9	1	1975 1976 1977 1978 1979 1980 1982 1984 1985	1985
**Montpellier RC**	8	4	2007 2009 2013 2014 2015 2017 2018 2019	2019
Pachys d'Herm	5	3	1992 1997 1998 2001 2003	2003
USAT XV Toulouges	4	0	2004 2005 2006 2008	2008
La Teste Rugby	4	0	1983 1986 1987 1988	1988
Violettes Bressanes	3	9	1974 1981 1989	1989
Caen Rugby Club	3	2	1999 2000 2002	2002
**Stade Bordelais**	3	0	2023 2024 2025	2025
Saint-Orens	2	5	1990 1993	1993
AS Romagnat	2	3	1994 1995	1995
USAP XV Féminin	2	1	2010 2011	2011
Rugby Club de Chilly-Mazarin	2	0	1991 1996	1996
**Stade Toulousain**	1	3	2022	2022
**Lille MRC Villeneuvois**	1	3	2016	2016
FC Auch	1	2	1973	1973
**ASM Romagnat**	1	1	2021	2021
Rugby Club Lonsois	1	0	2012	2012
ASVEL	1	0	1972	1972
Coquelicots de Tournus	0	4		
**Blagnac Rugby Féminin**	0	3		
Ovalie Caennaise	0	3		
**Stade Rennais Rugby**	0	2		
OF Valence Les Dragons Blancs	0	1		
**AC Bobigny 93 Rugby**	0	1		
RC Adour	0	1		
Tarbes Rugby	0	1		

== Media ==
=== Television ===
The first broadcasts of championship matches took place during the 2014–2015 season. Following the enthusiasm surrounding the 2014 Women's Rugby World Cup hosted in France, three channels tested broadcasting matches from the women's championship in January 2015. Eurosport broadcast the Perpignan vs Montpellier match on 11 January. The following week, as part of the 24 Hours of Women's Sport, Canal+ featured the Lille vs Perpignan match on 24 January, and France 4 covered Montpellier vs Blagnac-Saint-Orens game.

The first televised broadcast of a French championship final, between Montpellier RC and Lille MRC Villeneuvois in Bourg-en-Bresse, took place a few months later on 3 May 2015 on France 4.

In March 2016, Eurosport acquired the rights to the championship with the broadcast of 4 matches throughout the year, and the semi-finals and final.

On the 14th and final day of the 2016–2017 Top 8 season, Eurosport 2 broadcast a live and exclusive multiplex. The four matches scheduled were as follows: Villeneuve d'Ascq vs Bobigny, Romagnat vs Caen, Montpellier vs Rennes, and Blagnac-Saint-Orens vs Toulouse.

In 2016, France Télévisions and the FRF signed an agreement for the broadcasting of matches of the French national teams. The agreement also included the live broadcast of the Elite 1 final, in co-broadcasting with Eurosport, until 2021.

Some regular season matches are occasionally broadcast on France 3 Régions channels.

In 2024, the French Rugby Federation, the National Rugby League and Canal+ reached an agreement to broadcast some Elite 1 matches around a Top 14 fixture featuring the same home club and played in the same stadium. Bordeaux, Clermont, Lyon, Montpellier and Toulouse were the five clubs with two teams in the first division at that time.

=== Print ===
The Élite 1 championship is covered in the columns of Midi Olympique, a French bi-weekly newspaper specializing in rugby, and the daily newspaper L'Équipe, as well as in the sports pages of regional dailies, particularly in the South of France.
