= 2026 Women's Six Nations Championship squads =

Rugby competition teams

The 2026 Women's Six Nations Championship will be the 25th edition of the Women's Six Nations Championship, an annual rugby union competition contested by the national teams of England, France, Ireland, Italy, Scotland and Wales. England are the defending champions, having won their 21st title in 2025.

Note: Number of caps are indicated as of the first match of the tournament (11 April 2026).

== England ==
John Mitchell announced a 38-player squad on 19 March.

Head coach: (New Zealand) John Mitchell

Player	Position	Date of birth (age)	Caps	Club/province
May Campbell	Hooker	16 May 1996 (aged 29)	5	(England) Saracens
Amy Cokayne	Hooker	11 July 1996 (aged 29)	89	(England) Sale Sharks
Connie Powell	Hooker	13 July 2000 (aged 25)	19	(England) Harlequins
Sarah Bern	Prop	10 July 1997 (aged 28)	79	(England) Bristol Bears
Hannah Botterman	Prop	8 June 1999 (aged 26)	62	(England) Bristol Bears
Mackenzie Carson	Prop	24 June 1998 (aged 27)	23	(England) Gloucester–Hartpury
Kelsey Clifford	Prop	11 December 2001 (aged 24)	21	(England) Saracens
Lizzie Hanlon	Prop	30 July 2001 (aged 24)	1	(England) Harlequins
Annabel Meta	Prop	11 August 2005 (aged 20)	0	(England) Trailfinders
Maud Muir	Prop	12 July 2001 (aged 24)	48	(England) Gloucester–Hartpury
Christiana Balogun	Second row	2 October 1997 (aged 28)	0	(England) Bristol Bears
Lilli Ives Campion	Second row	10 October 2003 (aged 22)	5	(England) Loughborough Lightning
Demelza Short	Second row		0	(England) Bristol Bears
Morwenna Talling	Second row	5 August 2002 (aged 23)	28	(England) Sale Sharks
Jodie Verghese	Second row	9 January 2003 (aged 23)	0	(England) Saracens
Abi Burton	Back row	9 March 2000 (aged 26)	4	(England) Trailfinders
Maddie Feaunati	Back row	18 May 2002 (aged 23)	23	(England) Exeter Chiefs
Daisy Hibbert-Jones	Back row	23 October 2002 (aged 23)	1	(England) Loughborough Lightning
Sadia Kabeya	Back row	22 February 2002 (aged 24)	28	(England) Loughborough Lightning
Haineala Lutui	Back row	8 August 2006 (aged 19)	0	(England) Loughborough Lightning
Alex Matthews	Back row	3 August 1993 (aged 32)	81	(England) Gloucester–Hartpury
Marlie Packer	Back row	2 October 1989 (aged 36)	112	(England) Saracens
Natasha Hunt	Scrum-half	21 March 1989 (aged 37)	88	(England) Gloucester–Hartpury
Lucy Packer	Scrum-half	2 February 2000 (aged 26)	38	(England) Harlequins
Flo Robinson	Scrum-half	4 October 2001 (aged 24)	1	(England) Exeter Chiefs
Holly Aitchison	Fly-half	13 September 1997 (aged 28)	44	(England) Sale Sharks
Zoe Harrison	Fly-half	14 April 1998 (aged 27)	65	(England) Saracens
Tatyana Heard	Centre	14 January 1995 (aged 31)	36	(England) Gloucester–Hartpury
Megan Jones (c)	Centre	28 October 1996 (aged 29)	33	(England) Trailfinders
Sarah Parry	Centre	21 October 2005 (aged 20)	0	(England) Harlequins
Helena Rowland	Centre	19 September 1999 (aged 26)	46	(England) Loughborough Lightning
Jess Breach	Wing	4 November 1997 (aged 28)	53	(England) Saracens
Millie David	Wing	15 June 2005 (aged 20)	0	(England) Bristol Bears
Claudia Moloney-MacDonald	Wing	4 January 1996 (aged 30)	36	(England) Exeter Chiefs
Mia Venner	Wing	3 May 2002 (aged 23)	2	(England) Gloucester–Hartpury
Bo Westcombe-Evans	Wing	19 June 2002 (aged 23)	2	(England) Loughborough Lightning
Ellie Kildunne	Fullback	8 September 1999 (aged 26)	57	(England) Harlequins
Emma Sing	Fullback	11 March 2001 (aged 25)	13	(England) Gloucester–Hartpury

=== Call-ups ===
- On 30 March, Tatyana Heard was ruled out due to injury and replaced by Carmela Morrall.
- On 13 April, Natasha Hunt and Morwenna Talling where ruled out due to injury. Haidee Head and Sydney Gregson were named as their replacements.

Player	Position	Date of birth (age)	Caps	Club/province
Haidee Head	Back row	4 August 2004 (aged 21)	0	(England) Trailfinders
Sydney Gregson	Centre	20 January 1996 (aged 30)	7	(England) Saracens
Carmela Morrall	Centre	11 September 2004 (aged 21)	0	(England) Loughborough Lightning

== France ==
François Ratier's announced a 38-player squad for a training camp at Marcoussis. On 27 March 2026 the final 32-player squad was confirmed.

Head coach: (France) François Ratier

Player	Position	Date of birth (age)	Caps	Club/province
Mathilde Lazarko	Hooker	14 August 1999 (aged 26)	0	(France) ASM Rugby
Élisa Riffonneau	Hooker	26 November 2003 (aged 22)	20	(France) FC Grenoble Amazones
Rose Bernadou	Prop	27 March 2000 (aged 26)	28	(France) Montpellier
Maïlys Borak	Prop	12 January 2004 (aged 22)	0	(France) Stade Bordelais
Yllana Brosseau	Prop	5 September 2000 (aged 25)	27	(France) ASM Rugby
Annaëlle Deshaye	Prop	16 March 1996 (aged 30)	55	(France) Stade Bordelais
Assia Khalfaoui	Prop	24 March 2001 (aged 25)	37	(France) ASM Rugby
Ambre Mwayembe	Prop	23 January 2006 (aged 20)	19	(France) Stade Toulousain
Cloé Correa	Second row	23 November 2003 (aged 22)	0	(France) Stade Toulousain
Madoussou Fall Raclot	Second row	17 March 1998 (aged 28)	45	(France) Stade Bordelais
Manaé Feleu	Second row	3 February 2000 (aged 26)	30	(France) FC Grenoble Amazones
Siobhan Soqeta	Second row	15 April 2006 (aged 19)	0	(France) FC Grenoble Amazones
Kiara Zago	Second row	11 October 2005 (aged 20)	6	(France) Stade Toulousain
Axelle Berthoumieu	Flanker	9 July 2000 (aged 25)	26	(France) Stade Bordelais
Léa Champon	Flanker	25 February 2003 (aged 23)	15	(France) FC Grenoble Amazones
Elsa Peyras	Flanker		0	(France) Stade Bordelais
Khoudedia Cissokho	Back row	22 June 1999 (aged 26)	2	(France) Stade Bordelais
Charlotte Escudero	Back row	26 December 2000 (aged 25)	32	(France) Stade Toulousain
Pauline Bourdon Sansus	Scrum-half	4 November 1995 (aged 30)	71	(France) Stade Toulousain
Alexandra Chambon	Scrum-half	2 August 2000 (aged 25)	36	(France) ASM Rugby
Carla Arbez	Fly-half	24 May 1999 (aged 26)	16	(France) Stade Bordelais
Lina Queyroi	Fly-half	18 May 2001 (aged 24)	27	(France) Stade Toulousain
Louën Laramy	Centre	31 January 2003 (aged 23)	0	(France) Montpellier
Gabrielle Vernier	Centre	2 June 1997 (aged 28)	58	(France) Blagnac SC
Joanna Grisez	Wing	5 October 1996 (aged 29)	13	(France) Stade Bordelais
Marie Ibañez	Wing	3 October 2002 (aged 23)	0	(France) Stade Bordelais
Léa Murie	Wing	21 May 1998 (aged 27)	6	(France) Stade Toulousain
Aubane Rousset	Wing	16 September 2003 (aged 22)	0	(France) Stade Bordelais
Pauline Barrat	Fullback	1 June 2004 (aged 21)	0	(France) Stade Toulousain
Émilie Boulard	Fullback	23 August 1999 (aged 26)	41	(France) Blagnac SC
Morgane Bourgeois	Fullback	6 February 2003 (aged 23)	18	(France) Stade Bordelais
Anaïs Grando	Fullback	26 September 2002 (aged 23)	0	(France) ASM Rugby

=== Call-ups ===
- On 13 April, Joanna Grisez was ruled out due to injury and replaced by Teani Feleu.

Player	Position	Date of birth (age)	Caps	Club/province
Teani Feleu	Centre	19 December 2002 (aged 23)	17	(France) FC Grenoble Amazones

== Ireland ==
Bemand announced Ireland's 36-player squad on 18 March 2026.

Head coach: (England) Scott Bemand

Player	Position	Date of birth (age)	Caps	Club/province
Beth Buttimer	Hooker	18 August 2005 (aged 20)	0	(Ireland) Clovers / Munster
Neve Jones	Hooker	26 December 1998 (aged 27)	41	(England) Gloucester–Hartpury
Clíodhna Moloney-MacDonald	Hooker	31 May 1993 (aged 32)	49	(England) Exeter Chiefs
Eilís Cahill	Prop	15 January 2002 (aged 24)	0	(Ireland) Clovers / Munster
Linda Djougang	Prop	17 May 1996 (aged 29)	52	(Ireland) Wolfhounds / Leinster
Sadhbh McGrath	Prop	30 August 2004 (aged 21)	19	(Ireland) Clovers / Ulster
Niamh O'Dowd	Prop	21 April 2000 (aged 25)	20	(England) Gloucester–Hartpury
Ellena Perry	Prop	4 December 1997 (aged 28)	4	(England) Gloucester–Hartpury
Ruth Campbell	Second row	27 June 2003 (aged 22)	12	(Ireland) Clovers / Leinster
Aoibheann McGrath	Second row		0	(Ireland) Clovers / Munster
Sam Monaghan	Second row	25 June 1993 (aged 32)	27	(England) Gloucester–Hartpury
Fiona Tuite	Second row	27 December 1996 (aged 29)	20	(Ireland) Wolfhounds / Ulster
Jemima Adams Verling	Second row	11 July 2006 (aged 19)	0	(Ireland) Clovers / Connacht
Sophie Barrett	Back row	27 January 2004 (aged 22)	0	(Ireland) Wolfhounds / Ulster
Jane Clohessy	Back row	28 December 1998 (aged 27)	1	(Ireland) Clovers / Munster
Brittany Hogan	Back row	19 September 1998 (aged 27)	38	(England) Sale Sharks
Erin King (c)	Back row	21 October 2003 (aged 22)	7	(Ireland) Wolfhounds / Leinster
Grace Moore	Back row	21 May 1996 (aged 29)	26	(England) Trailfinders / (Ireland) Wolfhounds
Ailish Quinn	Back row	25 May 2006 (aged 19)	1	(Ireland) Clovers / Connacht
Aoife Wafer	Back row	25 March 2003 (aged 23)	16	(England) Harlequins
Dorothy Wall	Back row	4 May 2000 (aged 25)	37	(England) Exeter Chiefs
Emily Lane	Scrum-half	10 January 1999 (aged 27)	20	(Ireland) Clovers / Munster
Aoibheann Reilly	Scrum-half	1 November 2000 (aged 25)	19	(Ireland) Wolfhounds / Connacht
Caitríona Finn	Fly-half	4 June 2006 (aged 19)	0	(Ireland) Clovers / Munster
Stacey Flood	Fly-half	5 August 1996 (aged 29)	24	(Ireland) Wolfhounds / Leinster
Dannah O'Brien	Fly-half	22 September 2003 (aged 22)	30	(Ireland) Wolfhounds / Leinster
Enya Breen	Centre	23 April 1999 (aged 26)	33	(Ireland) Clovers / Munster
Aoife Dalton	Centre	3 May 2003 (aged 22)	28	(Ireland) Wolfhounds / Leinster
Eve Higgins	Centre	23 June 1999 (aged 26)	32	(Ireland) Wolfhounds / Leinster
Nancy McGillivray	Centre	15 November 2002 (aged 23)	3	(England) Exeter Chiefs
Vicky Elmes Kinlan	Wing	21 February 2003 (aged 23)	4	(Ireland) Wolfhounds / Leinster
Anna McGann	Wing	4 June 1998 (aged 27)	14	(Ireland) Clovers / Connacht
Beibhinn Parsons	Wing	30 November 2001 (aged 24)	31	(Ireland) Clovers / Connacht
Niamh Gallagher	Fullback	22 September 2005 (aged 20)	0	(England) Trailfinders
Alana McInerney	Fullback	22 June 2001 (aged 24)	0	(Ireland) Clovers / Munster
Robyn O'Connor	Fullback	15 July 2005 (aged 20)	0	(Ireland) Wolfhounds / Leinster

== Italy ==
Fabio Roselli announced a 34-player squad on 19 March.

Head coach: (Italy) Fabio Roselli

Player	Position	Date of birth (age)	Caps	Club/province
Chiara Cheli	Hooker	11 October 2005 (aged 20)	0	(Italy) Rugby Colorno
Désirée Spinelli	Hooker	28 April 2005 (aged 20)	5	(Italy) Benetton Rugby
Vittoria Vecchini	Hooker	13 January 2002 (aged 24)	41	(Italy) Valsugana Rugby Padova
Gaia Dosi	Prop	13 August 2004 (aged 21)	0	(Italy) Rugby Colorno
Gaia Maris	Prop	5 December 2001 (aged 24)	42	(Italy) Valsugana Rugby Padova
Alessia Pilani	Prop	6 March 1999 (aged 27)	9	(France) Stade Bordelais
Silvia Turani	Prop	6 July 1995 (aged 30)	47	(England) Harlequins
Vittoria Zanette	Prop	29 November 2004 (aged 21)	2	(France) Lyon OU
Francesca Andreoli	Second row	20 April 2004 (aged 21)	0	(Italy) Rugby Colorno
Elettra Costantini	Second row	9 August 2005 (aged 20)	0	(Italy) Valsugana Rugby Padova
Giordana Duca	Second row	18 September 1992 (aged 33)	60	(Italy) Valsugana Rugby Padova
Valeria Fedrighi	Second row	5 September 1992 (aged 33)	67	(Italy) Rugby Colorno
Alessandra Frangipani	Second row	12 July 2003 (aged 22)	13	(Italy) Villorba Rugby
Elena Errichiello	Back row	1 March 2003 (aged 23)	1	(Italy) Unione Rugby Capitolina
Elisa Giordano	Back row	1 November 1990 (aged 35)	78	(Italy) Valsugana Rugby Padova
Alissa Ranuccini	Back row	28 June 2000 (aged 25)	18	(France) Lyon OU
Francesca Sgorbini	Back row	7 January 2001 (aged 25)	37	(France) ASM Romagnat
Beatrice Veronese	Back row	11 March 1996 (aged 30)	31	(France) Toulon Provence Méditerranée
Alia Bitonci	Scrum-half	27 March 2006 (aged 20)	10	(Italy) Valsugana Rugby Padova
Gaia Buso	Scrum-half	19 August 2002 (aged 23)	4	(Italy) Villorba Rugby
Sofia Stefan	Scrum-half	12 May 1992 (aged 33)	101	(France) Toulon Provence Méditerranée
Veronica Madia	Fly-half	16 January 1995 (aged 31)	60	(France) Blagnac SC
Emma Stevanin	Fly-half	11 April 2002 (aged 24)	27	(Italy) Valsugana Rugby Padova
Natascia Aggio	Centre	23 July 2002 (aged 23)	0	(Italy) Valsugana Rugby Padova
Micol Cavina	Centre	15 November 1999 (aged 26)	5	(France) AC Bobigny 93
Giada Corradini	Centre	17 April 2002 (aged 23)	2	(France) Montpellier
Alyssa D'Incà	Centre	23 March 2002 (aged 24)	35	(France) Blagnac SC
Sara Mannini	Centre	28 August 2005 (aged 20)	12	(Italy) Rugby Colorno
Michela Sillari	Centre	23 February 1993 (aged 33)	94	(Italy) Valsugana Rugby Padova
Francesca Granzotto	Wing	22 March 2002 (aged 24)	24	(England) Exeter Chiefs
Rubina Grassi	Wing		0	(France) Toulon Provence Méditerranée
Aura Muzzo	Wing	12 April 1997 (aged 28)	58	(France) Lyon OU
Gabriella Serio	Wing	26 September 2001 (aged 24)	0	(Italy) Rugby Colorno
Vittoria Ostuni Minuzzi	Fullback	6 December 2001 (aged 24)	44	(Italy) Valsugana Rugby Padova

=== Call-ups ===
- On 30 March, Alessandra Frangipani was ruled out due to injury and replaced by Margherita Tonellotto.
- On 2 April, Francesca Andreoli was ruled out due to injury and replaced by Greta Copat.

Player	Position	Date of birth (age)	Caps	Club/province
Greta Copat	Back row	28 April 2005 (aged 20)	0	(Italy) Villorba Rugby
Margherita Tonellotto	Back row	30 October 2005 (aged 20)	0	(Italy) Valsugana Rugby Padova

== Scotland ==
Scotland Head Coach Sione Fukofuka named a 38-player squad on 18 March 2026.

Head coach: (Australia) Sione Fukofuka

Player	Position	Date of birth (age)	Caps	Club/province
Elis Martin	Hooker	23 May 1999 (aged 26)	26	(England) Loughborough Lightning
Aila Ronald	Hooker	18 April 2004 (aged 21)	0	(Scotland) Edinburgh Rugby / University of Edinburgh
Lana Skeldon	Hooker	18 October 1993 (aged 32)	84	(England) Bristol Bears
Aicha Sutcliffe	Hooker		0	(Scotland) Glasgow Warriors / Stirling County RFC
Leah Bartlett	Prop	28 August 1998 (aged 27)	49	(England) Sale Sharks
Elliann Clarke	Prop	16 February 2001 (aged 25)	24	(England) Bristol Bears
Poppy Fletcher	Prop		0	(Scotland) Glasgow Warriors / University of Edinburgh
Molly Poolman	Prop	10 May 2004 (aged 21)	7	(Scotland) Edinburgh Rugby / Watsonian FC
Imogen Spence	Prop		0	(Scotland) Glasgow Warriors / University of Edinburgh
Anne Young	Prop	17 March 2000 (aged 26)	22	(England) Loughborough Lightning
Holland Bogan	Second row	21 February 2005 (aged 21)	0	(Scotland) Glasgow Warriors / Stirling County RFC
Becky Boyd	Second row	17 May 2004 (aged 21)	3	(England) Loughborough Lightning
Hollie Cunningham	Second row	4 June 1999 (aged 26)	2	(England) Bristol Bears
Eva Donaldson	Second row	10 July 2001 (aged 24)	21	(England) Sale Sharks
Louise McMillan	Second row	27 July 1997 (aged 28)	53	(England) Saracens
Emma Wassell	Second row	28 December 1994 (aged 31)	72	(England) Trailfinders
Rachel Malcolm (c)	Flanker	23 May 1991 (aged 34)	61	(England) Trailfinders
Rachel McLachlan	Flanker	26 February 1999 (aged 27)	56	(France) Montpellier
Emily Coubrough	Back row	15 October 2006 (aged 19)	0	(Scotland) Glasgow Warriors / University of Edinburgh
Evie Gallagher	Back row	22 August 2000 (aged 25)	40	(England) Bristol Bears
Alex Stewart	Back row	28 May 2004 (aged 21)	17	(Scotland) Edinburgh Rugby / University of Edinburgh
Leia Brebner-Holden	Scrum-half	26 May 2002 (aged 23)	15	(England) Loughborough Lightning
Rhea Clarke	Scrum-half	31 August 2003 (aged 22)	2	(England) Bristol Bears
Rianna Darroch	Scrum-half	25 September 2005 (aged 20)	0	(Scotland) Glasgow Warriors / Hillhead Jordanhill RFC
Ceitidh Ainsworth	Fly-half		0	(Scotland) Glasgow Warriors / Stirling County RFC
Helen Nelson	Fly-half	24 May 1994 (aged 31)	75	(England) Loughborough Lightning
Hannah Ramsay	Fly-half	4 September 2003 (aged 22)	2	(Scotland) Edinburgh Rugby / Watsonian FC
Emma Orr	Centre	6 April 2003 (aged 23)	34	(England) Bristol Bears
Rachel Philipps	Centre	17 January 2002 (aged 24)	1	(Scotland) Edinburgh Rugby
Meryl Smith	Centre	11 June 2001 (aged 24)	22	(England) Bristol Bears
Evie Wills	Centre	4 February 2001 (aged 25)	8	(England) Sale Sharks
Shona Campbell	Wing	7 June 2001 (aged 24)	9	(England) Sale Sharks
Coreen Grant	Wing	30 January 1998 (aged 28)	17	(England) Harlequins
Rhona Lloyd	Wing	17 October 1996 (aged 29)	62	(England) Sale Sharks
Francesca McGhie	Wing	7 May 2003 (aged 22)	26	(England) Trailfinders
Chloe Rollie	Fullback	26 June 1995 (aged 30)	81	(France) Toulon Provence Méditerranée
Lucia Scott	Fullback	2 March 2004 (aged 22)	7	(England) Loughborough Lightning
Hannah Walker	Fullback		0	(Scotland) Edinburgh Rugby / University of Edinburgh

=== Call-ups ===
- On 30 March, Evie Gallagher was ruled out due to injury and replaced by Gemma Bell.
- On 1 April, Anne Young was ruled out due to injury and replaced by Demi Swann.
- On 14 April, Emma Orr was ruled out due to injury and replaced by Holly McIntyre.

Player	Position	Date of birth (age)	Caps	Club/province
Demi Swann	Prop	1 December 1995 (aged 30)	0	(England) Exeter Chiefs
Gemma Bell	Back row	17 June 2004 (aged 21)	1	(Scotland) Glasgow Warriors
Holly McIntyre	Centre	17 November 2002 (aged 23)	0	(France) Montpellier

== Wales ==
Sean Lynn named Kate Williams as the sole captain for the campaign on 20 March 2026, with co-captain Alex Callender ruled out of the tournament with injury. He announced the 38-player squad on 25 March.

Head coach: (Wales) Sean Lynn

Player	Position	Date of birth (age)	Caps	Club/province
Kelsey Jones	Hooker	4 September 1997 (aged 28)	52	(England) Gloucester–Hartpury
Carys Phillips	Hooker	12 November 1992 (aged 33)	87	(England) Harlequins
Molly Reardon	Hooker	22 September 2003 (aged 22)	12	(Wales) Gwalia Lightning
Katherine Baverstock	Prop	17 September 2002 (aged 23)	1	(England) Leicester Tigers
Maisie Davies	Prop	17 August 2005 (aged 20)	12	(England) Bristol Bears / (Wales) Gwalia Lightning
Elan Jones	Prop		0	(Wales) Brython Thunder
Stella Orrin	Prop		0	(England) Bristol Bears / (Wales) Brython Thunder
Gwenllian Pyrs	Prop	28 November 1997 (aged 28)	51	(England) Sale Sharks
Donna Rose	Prop	5 June 1991 (aged 34)	37	(England) Saracens
Jenni Scoble	Prop	28 March 1993 (aged 33)	8	(Wales) Gwalia Lightning
Sisilia Tuipulotu	Prop	14 August 2003 (aged 22)	31	(England) Gloucester–Hartpury / (Wales) Brython Thunder
Gwen Crabb	Second row	28 June 1999 (aged 26)	39	(Wales) Brython Thunder
Natalia John	Second row	15 February 1996 (aged 30)	48	(England) Bristol Bears / (Wales) Brython Thunder
Alaw Pyrs	Second row	12 October 2005 (aged 20)	10	(England) Gloucester–Hartpury / (Wales) Gwalia Lightning
Tilly Vucaj	Second row	3 November 2005 (aged 20)	2	(England) Gloucester–Hartpury / (Wales) Gwalia Lightning
Alisha Butchers	Flanker	14 June 1997 (aged 28)	54	(England) Bristol Bears / (Wales) Brython Thunder
Kate Williams	Flanker	5 April 2000 (aged 26)	24	(England) Gloucester–Hartpury / (Wales) Brython Thunder
Jorja Aiono	Back row	7 February 2007 (aged 19)	0	(England) Gloucester–Hartpury / (Wales) Brython Thunder
Georgia Evans	Back row	29 January 1997 (aged 29)	43	(England) Saracens
Bryonie King	Back row	14 August 2003 (aged 22)	12	(England) Bristol Bears / (Wales) Gwalia Lightning
Bethan Lewis	Back row	19 February 1999 (aged 27)	61	(England) Gloucester–Hartpury / (Wales) Gwalia Lightning
Branwen Metcalfe	Back row	27 September 2006 (aged 19)	1	(England) Gloucester–Hartpury / (Wales) Brython Thunder
Kendall Waudby	Back row	22 September 2002 (aged 23)	0	(England) Loughborough Lightning
Keira Bevan	Scrum-half	28 April 1997 (aged 28)	78	(England) Bristol Bears
Sian Jones	Scrum-half	3 December 2004 (aged 21)	13	(England) Gloucester–Hartpury / (Wales) Gwalia Lightning
Seren Lockwood	Scrum-half	28 October 2006 (aged 19)	4	(England) Gloucester–Hartpury / (Wales) Brython Thunder
Lleucu George	Fly-half	12 January 2000 (aged 26)	35	(England) Gloucester–Hartpury
Kayleigh Powell	Fly-half	18 February 1999 (aged 27)	28	(England) Harlequins
Carys Cox	Centre	5 November 1998 (aged 27)	23	(England) Trailfinders
Hannah Dallavalle	Centre	14 November 1996 (aged 29)	69	(England) Gloucester–Hartpury
Jenna De Vera	Centre	25 December 2003 (aged 22)	0	(England) Bristol Bears
Courtney Keight	Centre	27 December 1997 (aged 28)	28	(England) Sale Sharks / (Wales) Brython Thunder
Savannah Picton-Powell	Centre		0	(England) Bristol Bears / (Wales) Brython Thunder
Kelsie Webster	Centre		0	(Wales) Gwalia Lightning
Jasmine Joyce	Wing	9 October 1995 (aged 30)	53	(England) Bristol Bears / (Wales) Brython Thunder
Lisa Neumann	Wing	23 December 1993 (aged 32)	51	(England) Harlequins / (Wales) Brython Thunder
Nikita Prothero	Wing		0	(England) Sale Sharks / (Wales) Gwalia Lightning
Seren Singleton	Wing	11 March 2003 (aged 23)	0	(England) Bristol Bears / (Wales) Brython Thunder

=== Call-ups ===
- On 10 April, Savannah Picton-Powell was ruled out due to injury and replaced by Catherine Richards.

Player	Position	Date of birth (age)	Caps	Club/province
Catherine Richards	Wing	21 October 2000 (aged 25)	4	(Wales) Gwalia Lightning
