= 2023 Women's Six Nations Championship squads =

The 2023 Women's Six Nations Championship was the 22nd edition of the Women's Six Nations Championship, an annual rugby union competition contested by the national teams of England, France, Ireland, Italy, Scotland and Wales. England were the defending champions, having won their 18th title in 2022. There was no limit on the number of players each team may call up to play in the competition.

Note: Number of caps are indicated as of the first match of the tournament (25 March 2023).

== England ==
England's 42-player squad was announced on 2 March 2023.

On 22 March 2023, prop Mackenzie Carson was added to the squad, after her application to transfer her national allegiance from Canada, under new World Rugby eligibility regulations, was approved.

On 30 March 2023, lock Delaney Burns was called up to England's squad ahead of their second round fixture against Italy.

Head coach: (England) Simon Middleton

Player	Position	Date of birth (age)	Caps	Club/province
May Campbell	Hooker	16 May 1996 (aged 26)	0	(England) Saracens
Amy Cokayne	Hooker	11 July 1996 (aged 26)	70	(England) Harlequins
Lark Davies	Hooker	3 March 1995 (aged 28)	44	(England) Bristol Bears
Connie Powell	Hooker	13 July 2000 (aged 22)	7	(England) Gloucester-Hartpury
Hannah Sims	Hooker	3 November 1996 (aged 26)	0	(England) Harlequins
Sarah Bern	Prop	10 July 1997 (aged 25)	52	(England) Bristol Bears
Mackenzie Carson	Prop	9 March 2002 (aged 21)	0	(England) Saracens
Bryony Cleall	Prop	12 June 1992 (aged 30)	7	(England) Harlequins
Kelsey Clifford	Prop	11 December 2001 (aged 21)	0	(England) Saracens
Liz Crake	Prop	8 November 1994 (aged 28)	0	(England) Wasps
Detysha Harper	Prop	23 October 1998 (aged 24)	5	(England) Loughborough Lightning
Maud Muir	Prop	12 July 2001 (aged 21)	17	(England) Gloucester-Hartpury
Zoe Aldcroft	Lock	19 November 1996 (aged 26)	38	(England) Gloucester-Hartpury
Rosie Galligan	Lock	30 April 1998 (aged 24)	9	(England) Harlequins
Poppy Leitch	Lock	4 July 1997 (aged 25)	7	(England) Exeter Chiefs
Catherine O'Donnell	Lock	13 June 1996 (aged 26)	24	(England) Loughborough Lightning
Emily Robinson	Lock	22 June 2000 (aged 22)	0	(England) Harlequins
Morwenna Talling	Lock	29 September 2002 (aged 20)	5	(England) Loughborough Lightning
Sarah Beckett	Back row	14 February 1999 (aged 24)	25	(England) Gloucester-Hartpury
Poppy Cleall	Back row	12 June 1992 (aged 30)	7	(England) Saracens
Sadia Kabeya	Back row	22 February 2002 (aged 21)	8	(England) Loughborough Lightning
Alex Matthews	Back row	3 August 1993 (aged 29)	56	(England) Gloucester-Hartpury
Marlie Packer (cc)	Back row	2 October 1989 (aged 33)	89	(England) Saracens
Sarah Hunter (cc)	Back row	19 September 1985 (aged 37)	140	(England) Loughborough Lightning
Natasha Hunt	Scrum-half	21 March 1989 (aged 34)	60	(England) Gloucester-Hartpury
Leanne Infante	Scrum-half	18 July 1993 (aged 29)	57	(England) Saracens
Claudia MacDonald	Scrum-half	4 January 1996 (aged 27)	24	(England) Exeter Chiefs
Lucy Packer	Scrum-half	2 February 2000 (aged 23)	9	(England) Harlequins
Ella Wyrwas	Scrum-half	7 March 1999 (aged 24)	0	(England) Saracens
Lizzie Duffy	Fly-half	12 February 2002 (aged 21)	0	(England) Sale Sharks
Helena Rowland	Fly-half	19 September 1999 (aged 23)	22	(England) Loughborough Lightning
Holly Aitchison	Centre	13 September 1997 (aged 25)	15	(England) Saracens
Tatyana Heard	Centre	14 January 1995 (aged 28)	9	(England) Gloucester-Hartpury
Amber Reed	Centre	3 April 1991 (aged 31)	62	(England) Bristol Bears
Lagi Tuima	Centre	16 June 1998 (aged 24)	12	(England) Harlequins
Jess Breach	Wing	4 November 1997 (aged 25)	24	(England) Saracens
Abigail Dow	Wing	29 September 1997 (aged 25)	30	(England) Harlequins
Nancy McGillivray	Wing	15 November 2002 (aged 20)	0	(England) Exeter Chiefs
Ellie Rugman	Wing	14 June 1993 (aged 29)	0	(England) Gloucester-Hartpury
Lydia Thompson	Wing	10 February 1992 (aged 31)	58	(England) University of Worcester Warriors
Ellie Kildunne	Fullback	8 September 1999 (aged 23)	31	(England) Harlequins
Sarah McKenna	Fullback	23 March 1989 (aged 34)	43	(England) Saracens
Emma Sing	Fullback	11 March 2001 (aged 22)	2	(England) Gloucester-Hartpury

== France ==
France's 36-player squad was announced on 7 March 2023.

Head coach: (France) Thomas Darracq

Note: Flags indicate national union for the club/province as defined by World Rugby.

Player	Position	Date of birth (age)	Caps	Club/province
Julie Annery	Flanker	12 June 1995 (aged 27)	13	(France) Stade Bordelais
Carla Arbez	Fly-half	24 May 1999 (aged 23)	4	(France) Stade Bordelais
Cyrielle Banet	Wing	29 August 1994 (aged 28)	18	(France) Montpellier HR
Rose Bernadou	Prop	27 March 2000 (aged 22)	12	(France) Montpellier HR
Axelle Berthoumieu	Flanker	9 July 2000 (aged 22)	9	(France) Blagnac Rugby Féminin
Caroline Boujard	Wing	6 January 1994 (aged 29)	26	(France) Montpellier HR
Émilie Boulard	Fullback	23 August 1999 (aged 23)	23	(France) Blagnac Rugby Féminin
Pauline Bourdon	Scrum-half	4 November 1995 (aged 27)	33	(France) Stade Toulousain
Morgane Bourgeois	Fly-half	6 February 2003 (aged 20)	1	(France) Stade Bordelais
Alexandra Chambon	Scrum-half	2 August 2000 (aged 22)	14	(France) FC Grenoble Amazones
Léa Champon	Flanker	2003 (aged 20)	0	(France) FC Grenoble Amazones
Annaëlle Deshayes	Prop	16 March 1996 (aged 27)	25	(France) Stade Bordelais
Célia Domain	Hooker	29 April 2000 (aged 22)	7	(France) Blagnac Rugby Féminin
Margaux Ducès	Scrum-half	19 August 2003 (aged 19)	1	(France) Stade Rennais Rugby
Marie Dupouy	Centre	2 November 2001 (aged 21)	3	(France) Blagnac Rugby Féminin
Charlotte Escudero	Flanker	26 December 2000 (aged 22)	11	(France) Blagnac Rugby Féminin
Manaé Feleu	Lock	3 February 2000 (aged 23)	8	(France) FC Grenoble Amazones
Maëlle Filopon	Wing	27 May 1997 (aged 25)	18	(France) Stade Toulousain
Audrey Forlani	Lock	19 November 1991 (aged 31)	24	(France) Blagnac Rugby Féminin
Lilou Graciet	Fullback	26 February 2004 (aged 19)	0	(France) Lyon OU
Émeline Gros	Number 8	19 August 1995 (aged 27)	20	(France) FC Grenoble Amazones
Gaëlle Hermet	Flanker	12 June 1996 (aged 26)	38	(France) Stade Toulousain
Clara Joyeux	Prop	10 January 1998 (aged 25)	30	(France) Blagnac Rugby Féminin
Assia Khalfaoui	Prop	24 March 2001 (aged 22)	14	(France) Stade Bordelais
Maé Levy	Centre	9 November 2004 (aged 18)	0	(France) Montpellier HR
Coco Lindelauf	Prop	17 January 2001 (aged 22)	16	(France) Blagnac Rugby Féminin
Mélissande Llorens	Wing	18 June 2002 (aged 20)	9	(France) Blagnac Rugby Féminin
Marine Ménager	Wing	26 July 1996 (aged 26)	30	(France) Montpellier HR
Romane Ménager	Number 8	26 July 1996 (aged 26)	30	(France) Montpellier HR
Ambre Mwayembe	Lock	2004 (aged 19)	2	(France) FC Grenoble Amazones
Maëlle Picut	Flanker	2000 (aged 23)	4	(France) Blagnac Rugby Féminin
Élisa Riffonneau	Lock	2003 (aged 20)	3	(France) Stade Rennais Rugby
Agathe Sochat	Hooker	21 May 1995 (aged 27)	32	(France) Stade Bordelais
Mabinty Sylla	Wing	3 February 2000 (aged 23)	0	(France) Stade Bordelais
Jessy Trémoulière	Fullback	29 July 1992 (aged 30)	28	(France) ASM Romagnat Rugby Féminin
Gabrielle Vernier	Centre	12 June 1997 (aged 25)	30	(France) Blagnac Rugby Féminin

== Ireland ==
Ireland's 32-player squad was announced on 28 February 2023.

Head coach: (Ireland) Greg McWilliams

Player	Position	Date of birth (age)	Caps	Club/province
Neve Jones	Hooker	26 December 1998 (aged 24)	12	(England) Gloucester-Hartpury / (Ireland) Ulster
Deirbhile Nic a Bháird	Hooker	12 September 1995 (aged 27)	0	(Ireland) Old Belvedere / (Ireland) Munster
Clara Nielson	Hooker	22 October 1990 (aged 32)	0	(England) Exeter Chiefs / (Ireland) IQ
Kathryn Buggy	Prop	1 September 1987 (aged 35)	0	(England) Gloucester-Hartpury / (Ireland) Ulster
Linda Djougang	Prop	17 May 1996 (aged 26)	22	(Ireland) Old Belvedere / (Ireland) Leinster
Christy Haney	Prop	2 February 1994 (aged 29)	0	(Ireland) Blackrock College / (Ireland) Leinster
Sadhbh McGrath	Prop	30 August 2004 (aged 18)	0	(Ireland) City of Derry / (Ireland) Cooke / (Ireland) Ulster
Niamh O'Dowd	Prop	17 May 1996 (aged 26)	0	(Ireland) Old Belvedere / (Ireland) Leinster
Nichola Fryday (c)	Lock	2 June 1995 (aged 27)	27	(England) Exeter Chiefs / (Ireland) Connacht
Sam Monaghan	Lock	25 June 1996 (aged 26)	10	(England) Gloucester-Hartpury / (Ireland) IQ
Fiona Tuite	Lock	8 November 1992 (aged 30)	0	(Ireland) Old Belvedere / (Ireland) Ulster
Jo Brown	Back row	3 September 1993 (aged 29)	1	(England) University of Worcester Warriors / (Ireland) IQ
Brittany Hogan	Back row	19 September 1998 (aged 24)	10	(Ireland) Old Belvedere / (Ireland) Ulster
Edel McMahon	Back row	25 March 1994 (aged 29)	19	(England) Exeter Chiefs / (Ireland) Connacht
Grace Moore	Back row	21 May 1996 (aged 26)	5	(England) Saracens / (Ireland) IQ
Hannah O'Connor	Back row	28 April 1990 (aged 32)	12	(Ireland) Blackrock College / (Ireland) Leinster
Maeve Óg O'Leary	Back row	6 March 2000 (aged 23)	2	(Ireland) Blackrock College / (Ireland) Munster
Aoife Wafer	Back row	25 May 2003 (aged 19)	1	(Ireland) Blackrock College / (Ireland) Leinster
Dorothy Wall	Back row	4 May 2000 (aged 22)	12	(Ireland) Blackrock College / (Ireland) Munster
Ailsa Hughes	Scrum-half	18 August 1991 (aged 31)	15	(Ireland) Railway Union / (Ireland) Leinster
Molly Scuffil-McCabe	Scrum-half	15 March 1998 (aged 25)	4	(Ireland) Railway Union / (Ireland) Leinster
Emma Swords	Scrum-half	22 October 1995 (aged 27)	0	(England) Harlequins / (Ireland) IQ
Nicole Cronin	Fly-half	20 August 1992 (aged 30)	19	(Ireland) UL Bohemian / (Ireland) Munster
Dannah O'Brien	Fly-half	22 September 2003 (aged 19)	2	(Ireland) Old Belvedere / (Ireland) Leinster
Enya Breen	Centre	23 April 1999 (aged 23)	15	(Ireland) Blackrock College / (Ireland) Munster
Aoife Dalton	Centre	3 May 2003 (aged 19)	2	(Ireland) Blackrock College / (Ireland) Munster
Natasja Behan	Wing	18 February 2000 (aged 23)	2	(Ireland) Blackrock College / (Ireland) Leinster
Lauren Delany	Wing	17 June 1989 (aged 33)	18	(England) Sale Sharks / (Ireland) IQ
Aoife Doyle	Wing	17 June 1989 (aged 33)	12	(Ireland) Railway Union / (Ireland) Munster
Ella Roberts	Wing	27 May 2001 (aged 21)	0	(Ireland) Wicklow / (Ireland) Leinster
Méabh Deely	Fullback	2 June 1995 (aged 27)	0	(Ireland) Blackrock College / (Ireland) Connacht
Vicky Irwin	Fullback	4 April 1998 (aged 24)	1	(England) Sale Sharks / (Ireland) Ulster

== Italy ==
On 6 March 2023, Italy named a 38-player squad for the 2023 Women's Six Nations Championship.

Head coach: (Italy) Giovanni Raineri

Player	Position	Age	Caps	Club
Sara Barattin	Scrum-half	36	111	(Italy) Arredissima Villorba Rugby
Francesca Barro	Prop	23	1	(Italy) Valsugana Rugby Padova
Jessica Busato	Centre	29	11	(Italy) Arredissima Villorba Rugby
Gaia Buso	Centre		0	(Italy) Rugby Colorno
Beatrice Capomaggi	Centre	26	7	(Italy) Arredissima Villorba Rugby
Alice Cassaghi	Prop	23	3	(Italy) CUS Milano
Giulia Cavina	Flanker	23	0	(Italy) CUS Milano
Mathilde Cheval	Centre		0	(Italy) Valsugana Rugby Padova
Alyssa D'Incà	Centre	21	15	(Italy) Arredissima Villorba Rugby
Giordana Duca	Lock	30	34	(Italy) Valsugana Rugby Padova
Valeria Fedrighi	Lock	30	28	(France) Stade Toulousain
Giada Franco	Flanker	26	23	(Italy) Rugby Colorno
Alessandra Frangipani	Flanker	19	3	(Italy) Arredissima Villorba Rugby
Lucia Gai	Prop	31	29	(Italy) Valsugana Rugby Padova
Elisa Giordano	Flanker	32	27	(Italy) Valsugana Rugby Padova
Francesca Granzotto	Scrum-half	21	4	(Italy) Unione Rugby Capitolina
Alessia Gronda	Wing	22	0	(Italy) CUS Torino
Laura Gurioli	Hooker	28	2	(Italy) Arredissima Villorba Rugby
Isabella Locatelli	Lock	28	23	(Italy) Rugby Colorno
Veronica Madia	Fly-half	28	27	(Italy) Rugby Colorno
Alessia Margotti	Lock	23	1	(Italy) Valsugana Rugby Padova
Gaia Maris	Prop	21	18	(Italy) Valsugana Rugby Padova
Aura Muzzo	Wing	26	29	(Italy) Arredissima Villorba Rugby
Vittoria Ostuni Minuzzi	Wing	21	20	(Italy) Valsugana Rugby Padova
Alessia Pilani	Prop		0	(Italy) Rugby Colorno
Alissa Ranuccini	Flanker	22	2	(Italy) Rugby Colorno
Beatrice Rigoni	Centre	27	32	(Italy) Valsugana Rugby Padova
Sofia Rolfi	Wing	21	0	(Italy) Rugby Colorno
Sara Seye	Prop	22	15	(Italy) Transvecta Rugby Calvisano
Francesca Sgorbini	Flanker	22	18	(France) ASM Romagnat
Michela Sillari	Centre	30	74	(Italy) Valsugana Rugby Padova
Emanuela Stecca	Prop	26	9	(Italy) Arredissima Villorba Rugby
Sofia Stefan	Scrum-half	30	73	(Italy) Valsugana Rugby Padova
Emma Stevanin	Fly-half	21	6	(Italy) Valsugana Rugby Padova
Arianna Toeschi	Scrum-half	22	0	(Italy) CUS Torino
Sara Tounesi	Lock	27	23	(England) Sale Sharks
Silvia Turani	Prop	27	22	(England) Exeter Chiefs
Vittoria Vecchini	Hooker	21	15	(Italy) Valsugana Rugby Padova

== Scotland ==
On 13 March 2023, Scotland named a 37-player squad for the 2023 Women's Six Nations Championship.

Head coach: (Scotland) Bryan Easson

Player	Position	Age	Caps	Club
Leah Bartlett	Prop	24	20	(England) Loughborough Lightning
Christine Belisle	Prop	29	18	(England) Loughborough Lightning
Beth Blacklock	Centre	25	3	(England) Harlequins
Sarah Bonar	Lock	29	21	(England) Harlequins
Elliann Clarke	Prop	22	7	(Scotland) University of Edinburgh
Rhea Clarke	Scrum-Half		0	(Scotland) University of Edinburgh
Lisa Cockburn	Prop	30	12	(England) University of Worcester Warriors
Fiona Cooper	Flanker		0	(England) Wasps
Eva Donaldson	Flanker	21	6	(Scotland) University of Edinburgh
Erinn Foley	Flanker		0	(Scotland) Hillhead Jordanhill
Evie Gallagher	Number 8	22	13	(England) University of Worcester Warriors
Coreen Grant	Centre	25	6	(England) Saracens
Jade Konkel-Roberts	Number 8	29	21	(England) Harlequins
Sarah Law	Fly-half	28	19	(England) Sale Sharks
Rachel Malcolm (c)	Flanker	31	26	(England) Loughborough Lightning
Elis Martin	Hooker	23	1	(England) DMP Sharks
Caity Mattinson	Scrum-Half	26	12	(England) University of Worcester Warriors
Mairi McDonald	Scrum-Half	25	15	(England) Exeter Chiefs
Francesca McGhie	Wing		4	(Scotland) Watsonians
Holly McIntyre	Centre		0	(Scotland) University of Edinburgh
Rachel McLachlan	Flanker	24	23	(England) Sale Sharks
Louise McMillan	Lock	25	24	(England) Saracens
Liz Musgrove	Wing	26	15	(England) Wasps
Panashe Muzambe	Prop	27	6	(England) Exeter Chiefs
Helen Nelson (vc)	Fly-half	28	30	(England) Loughborough Lightning
Lyndsay O'Donnell	Lock	29	9	(England) Bristol Bears
Emma Orr	Centre	20	9	(Scotland) Heriot's / Biggar
Jodie Rettie	Hooker	32	24	(England) Saracens
Chloe Rollie	Full Back	27	28	(England) Loughborough Lightning
Eilidh Sinclair	Wing	27	5	(England) Exeter Chiefs
Lana Skeldon	Hooker	29	30	(England) University of Worcester Warriors
Meryl Smith	Centre	21	10	(Scotland) University of Edinburgh
Lisa Thomson	Centre	25	27	(United Kingdom) Great Britain Sevens
Emma Turner	Number 8		0	(Scotland) Corstorphine Cougars
Emma Wassell	Lock	28	25	(England) Loughborough Lightning
Evie Wills	Centre	22	4	(Scotland) Hillhead Jordanhill
Anne Young	Prop	23	7	(England) Sale Sharks

== Wales ==
Wales 36-player squad was announced on 8 March 2023.

Head coach: (Wales) Ioan Cunningham

Player	Position	Date of birth (age)	Caps	Club/province
Kat Evans	Hooker	9 January 1986 (age 39)	5	(England) Saracens
Kelsey Jones	Hooker	4 September 1997 (age 27)	34	(England) Gloucester-Hartpury
Carys Phillips	Hooker	12 November 1992 (age 32)	63	(England) Worcester Warriors
Abbey Constable	Prop	18 June 1991 (age 33)	0	(England) Gloucester-Hartpury
Cerys Hale	Prop	4 April 1993 (age 32)	43	(England) Gloucester-Hartpury
Cara Hope	Prop	24 November 1993 (age 31)	25	(England) Gloucester-Hartpury
Gwenllian Pyrs	Prop	28 November 1997 (age 27)	23	(England) Bristol Bears
Caryl Thomas	Prop	19 February 1986 (age 39)	64	(England) Worcester Warriors
Sisilia Tuipulotu	Prop	14 August 2003 (age 21)	8	(England) Gloucester-Hartpury
Gwen Crabb	Lock	28 June 1999 (age 25)	29	(England) Gloucester-Hartpury
Georgia Evans	Lock	29 January 1997 (age 28)	16	(England) Saracens
Natalia John	Lock	15 February 1996 (age 29)	33	(England) Worcester Warriors
Charlie Mundy	Lock	28 November 1995 (age 29)	0	(Wales) Ospreys / Pontyclun Falcons
Alex Callender	Back row	29 July 2000 (age 24)	24	(England) Worcester Warriors
Abbie Fleming	Back row	31 March 1996 (age 29)	6	(England) Exeter Chiefs
Sioned Harries	Back row	22 November 1989 (age 35)	70	(England) Worcester Warriors
Bethan Lewis	Back row	19 February 1999 (age 26)	34	(England) Gloucester-Hartpury
Kate Williams	Back row	5 April 2000 (age 25)	1	(England) Gloucester-Hartpury
Keira Bevan	Scrum-half	28 April 1997 (age 28)	49	(England) Bristol Bears
Megan Davies	Scrum-half	19 January 2002 (age 23)	3	(England) Bristol Bears
Ffion Lewis	Scrum-half	29 June 1996 (age 28)	29	(England) Worcester Warriors
Elinor Snowsill	Fly-half	27 June 1989 (age 35)	72	(England) Bristol Bears
Niamh Terry	Fly-half	30 April 2000 (age 24)	8	(England) Worcester Warriors
Robyn Wilkins	Fly-half	1 April 1995 (age 30)	62	(England) Exeter Chiefs
Lleucu George	Centre	12 January 2000 (age 25)	11	(England) Gloucester-Hartpury
Hannah Jones (c)	Centre	14 November 1996 (age 28)	44	(England) Gloucester-Hartpury
Bryonie King	Centre	14 August 2003 (age 21)	0	(England) Bristol Bears
Kerin Lake	Centre	24 May 1990 (age 34)	41	(England) Gloucester-Hartpury
Catherine Richards	Centre	21 October 2000 (age 24)	0	(England) Gloucester-Hartpury
Jenna De Vera	Centre	25 December 2003 (age 21)	0	(Wales) Scarlets / Burry Port
Carys Williams-Morris	Centre	28 September 1993 (age 31)	5	(England) Loughborough Lightning
Hannah Bluck	Wing	1 April 1997 (age 28)	6	(England) Worcester Warriors
Courtney Keight	Wing	27 December 1997 (age 27)	6	(England) Bristol Bears
Lisa Neumann	Wing	23 December 1993 (age 31)	32	(England) Gloucester-Hartpury
Lowri Norkett	Wing	5 April 1995 (age 30)	4	(England) Worcester Warriors
Amelia Tutt	Fullback	2 June 2003 (age 21)	0	(England) Loughborough Lightning
