= 2024 Women's Six Nations Championship squads =

The 2024 Women's Six Nations Championship was the 23rd edition of the Women's Six Nations Championship, an annual rugby union competition contested by the national teams of England, France, Ireland, Italy, Scotland and Wales. England are the defending champions, having won their 19th title in 2023.

Note: Number of caps are indicated as of the first match of the tournament (23 March 2024).

== England ==
John Mitchell announced England's 35 player squad on 11 March 2024.

Head coach: (New Zealand) John Mitchell

Player	Position	Date of birth (age)	Caps	Club/province
Lark Atkin-Davies	Hooker	3 March 1995 (aged 29)	54	(England) Bristol Bears
Amy Cokayne	Hooker	11 July 1996 (aged 27)	72	(England) Leicester Tigers
Lizzie Hanlon	Hooker	30 July 2001 (aged 22)	0	(England) Exeter Chiefs
Connie Powell	Hooker	13 July 2000 (aged 23)	14	(England) Harlequins
Hannah Botterman	Prop	8 June 1999 (aged 24)	42	(England) Bristol Bears
Mackenzie Carson	Prop	28 November 1998 (aged 25)	10	(England) Gloucester-Hartpury
Kelsey Clifford	Prop	11 December 2001 (aged 22)	3	(England) Saracens
Maud Muir	Prop	12 July 2001 (aged 22)	25	(England) Gloucester-Hartpury
Zoe Aldcroft	Lock	19 November 1996 (aged 26)	48	(England) Gloucester-Hartpury
Rosie Galligan	Lock	30 April 1998 (aged 25)	14	(England) Saracens
Catherine O'Donnell	Lock	13 June 1996 (aged 27)	30	(England) Loughborough Lightning
Morwenna Talling	Lock	29 September 2002 (aged 21)	11	(England) Sale Sharks
Abbie Ward	Lock	27 March 1993 (aged 30)	61	(England) Bristol Bears
Sarah Beckett	Back row	14 February 1999 (aged 25)	34	(England) Gloucester-Hartpury
Poppy Cleall	Back row	12 June 1992 (aged 31)	65	(England) Saracens
Maddie Feaunati	Back row	18 May 2002 (aged 21)	0	(England) Exeter Chiefs
Sadia Kabeya	Back row	22 February 2002 (aged 22)	13	(England) Loughborough Lightning
Alex Matthews	Back row	3 August 1993 (aged 30)	62	(England) Gloucester-Hartpury
Marlie Packer (c)	Back row	2 October 1989 (aged 34)	99	(England) Saracens
Natasha Hunt	Scrum-half	21 March 1989 (aged 35)	67	(England) Gloucester-Hartpury
Lucy Packer	Scrum-half	2 February 2000 (aged 24)	16	(England) Harlequins
Ella Wyrwas	Scrum-half	7 March 1999 (aged 25)	6	(England) Saracens
Holly Aitchison	Fly-half	13 September 1997 (aged 26)	25	(England) Bristol Bears
Zoe Harrison	Fly-half	14 April 1998 (aged 25)	46	(England) Saracens
Helena Rowland	Fly-half	19 September 1999 (aged 24)	28	(England) Loughborough Lightning
Sophie Bridger	Centre	26 June 2000 (aged 23)	2	(England) Saracens
Sydney Gregson	Centre	20 January 1996 (aged 28)	3	(England) Saracens
Tatyana Heard	Centre	14 January 1995 (aged 29)	18	(England) Gloucester-Hartpury
Megan Jones	Centre	28 October 1996 (aged 27)	16	(England) Leicester Tigers
Emily Scarratt	Centre	8 February 1990 (aged 34)	108	(England) Loughborough Lightning
Jess Breach	Wing	4 November 1997 (aged 26)	33	(England) Saracens
Abigail Dow	Wing	29 September 1997 (aged 26)	40	(England) Trailfinders
Vicky Laflin	Wing	23 July 1997 (aged 26)	0	(England) Trailfinders
Ellie Kildunne	Fullback	8 September 1999 (aged 24)	38	(England) Harlequins
Emma Sing	Fullback	11 March 2001 (aged 23)	6	(England) Gloucester-Hartpury

== France ==
France announced their 35-player squad on 8 March 2024.

Head coach: (France) Gaëlle Mignot & (France) David Ortiz

Player	Position	Date of birth (age)	Caps	Club/province
Agathe Sochat	Hooker	21 May 1995 (aged 28)		(France) Stade Bordelais
Élisa Riffonneau	Hooker	26 November 2003 (aged 20)	4	(England) Trailfinders Women
Manon Bigot	Hooker	6 June 1990 (aged 33)	2	(France) Blagnac
Annaëlle Deshayes	Prop	16 March 1996 (aged 28)	16	(France) Stade Bordelais
Clara Joyeux	Prop	10 January 1998 (aged 26)		(France) Stade Bordelais
Assia Khalfaoui	Prop	24 March 2001 (aged 22)		(France) Stade Bordelais
Coco Lindelauf	Prop	17 January 2001 (aged 23)		(France) Blagnac Rugby
Rose Bernadou	Prop	27 March 2000 (aged 23)		(France) Montpellier
Kiara Zago	Second row	11 October 2005 (aged 18)		(France) Stade Toulousain
Ambrew Mwayembe	Second row	6 April 2004 (aged 19)		(France) FC Grenoble Amazones
Madoussou Fall Raclot	Second row	17 March 1998 (aged 26)		(France) Stade Bordelais
Manaé Feleu	Second row	3 February 2000 (aged 24)		(France) FC Grenoble Amazones
Romane Ménager	Back row	26 July 1996 (aged 27)		(France) Montpellier
Gaëlle Hermet	Back row	12 June 1996 (aged 27)		(France) Stade Toulousain
Emeline Gros	Back row	19 August 1995 (aged 28)		(France) FC Grenoble Amazones
Axelle Berthoumieu	Back row	9 July 2000 (aged 23)		(France) Blagnac Rugby
Charlotte Escudero	Back row	26 December 2000 (aged 23)		(France) Stade Toulousain
Léa Champon	Back row	28 November 2003 (aged 20)		(France) FC Grenoble Amazones
Pauline Bourdon Sansus	Scrum-half	4 November 1995 (aged 28)		(France) Stade Toulousain
Lina Tuy	Scrum-half	10 September 2004 (aged 19)		(France) ASM Romagnat
Océane Bordes	Scrum-half	16 May 2002 (aged 21)		(France) Stade Toulousain
Alexandra Chambon	Scrum-half	2 August 2000 (aged 23)		(France) FC Grenoble Amazones
Suliana Sivi	Scrum-half	2004 (aged 19)		(France) Stade Rennais
Chloé Vauclin	Scrum-half	7 March 2005 (aged 19)		(France) Stade Rennais
Caroline Drouin	Fly-half	7 July 1996 (aged 27)		(France) Stade Rennais
Nassira Konde	Centre	30 July 1999 (aged 24)		(France) Stade Bordelais
Gabrielle Vernier	Centre	12 June 1997 (aged 26)		(France) Blagnac Rugby
Lina Queyroi	Centre	18 May 2001 (aged 22)		(France) Blagnac Rugby
Teani Feleu	Centre	19 December 2002 (aged 21)		(France) FC Grenoble Amazones
Kelly Arbey	Wing	9 May 2005 (aged 18)		(France) Stade Toulousain
Marine Ménager	Wing	26 July 1996 (aged 27)		(France) Montpellier
Cyrielle Banet	Wing	29 August 1994 (aged 29)		(France) Montpellier
Émilie Boulard	Fullback	23 August 1999 (aged 24)		(France) Blagnac Rugby
Morgane Bourgeois	Fullback	6 February 2003 (aged 21)		(France) Stade Bordelais
Lilou Graciet	Fullback	26 February 2004 (aged 20)		(France) Lyon OU

== Ireland ==
Ireland's 35-player squad was announced on 19 February 2024.

Head coach: (England) Scott Bemand

Player	Position	Date of birth (age)	Caps	Club/province
Sarah Delaney	Hooker	8 December 2004 (aged 19)	2	(Ireland) Blackrock College / Leinster
Neve Jones	Hooker	26 December 1998 (aged 25)	21	(England) Gloucester-Hartpury / (Ireland) Ulster
Megan Collis	Prop	6 December 2001 (aged 22)	1	(Ireland) Railway Union / Leinster
Linda Djougang	Prop	17 May 1996 (aged 27)	32	(Ireland) Old Belvedere / Leinster
Christy Haney	Prop	2 February 1994 (aged 30)	13	(Ireland) Blackrock College / Leinster
Sadhbh McGrath	Prop	30 August 2004 (aged 19)	8	(Ireland) MU Barnhall / Cooke / Leinster
Niamh O'Dowd	Prop	21 April 2000 (aged 23)	2	(Ireland) Old Belvedere / Leinster
Andrea Stock	Prop	9 August 1999 (aged 24)	0	(England) Trailfinders Women / (Ireland) IQ
Ruth Campbell	Lock	27 June 2003 (aged 20)	0	(Ireland) Old Belvedere / Leinster
Eimear Corri	Lock	9 April 1998 (aged 25)	3	(Ireland) Blackrock College / Leinster
Edel McMahon (cc)	Lock	25 March 1994 (aged 29)	24	(England) Exeter Chiefs / (Ireland) Connacht
Sam Monaghan (cc)	Lock	25 June 1993 (aged 30)	18	(England) Gloucester-Hartpury
Claire Boles	Back row	28 May 1998 (aged 25)	3	(Ireland) Railway Union / Ulster
Brittany Hogan	Back row	19 September 1998 (aged 25)	18	(Ireland) Old Belvedere / Ulster
Shannon Ikahihifo	Back row	13 March 1995 (aged 29)	0	(England) Trailfinders Women / (Ireland) IQ
Grace Moore	Back row	21 May 1996 (aged 27)	13	(England) Saracens / (Ireland) IQ
Aoife Wafer	Back row	25 March 2003 (aged 20)	2	(Ireland) Blackrock College / Munster
Dorothy Wall	Back row	4 May 2000 (aged 23)	23	(Ireland) Blackrock College / Munster
Aoibheann Reilly	Scrum-half	1 November 2000 (aged 23)	7	(Ireland) Blackrock College / Connacht
Molly Scuffil-McCabe	Scrum-half	15 March 1998 (aged 25)	12	(Ireland) Railway Union / Leinster
Nicole Fowley	Fly-half	23 December 1992 (aged 31)	10	(Ireland) Galwegians / Leinster
Dannah O'Brien	Fly-half	22 September 2003 (aged 20)	10	(Ireland) Old Belvedere / Leinster
Enya Breen	Centre	23 April 1999 (aged 24)	17	(Ireland) Blackrock College / Munster
Aoife Dalton	Centre	3 May 2003 (aged 20)	10	(Ireland) Blackrock College / Munster
Eve Higgins	Centre	23 June 1999 (aged 24)	12	(Ireland) Railway Union / Leinster
Natasja Behan	Wing	18 February 2000 (aged 24)	2	(Ireland) Blackrock College / Leinster
Clare Gorman	Wing	23 June 2001 (aged 22)	0	(Ireland) Old Belvedere / Leinster
Katie Heffernan	Wing	8 September 1998 (aged 25)	0	(Ireland) Railway Union / Leinster
Beibhinn Parsons	Wing	30 November 2001 (aged 22)	21	(Ireland) Blackrock College / Connacht
Méabh Dealy	Fullback	2 June 1995 (aged 28)	0	(Ireland) Blackrock College / Connacht
Lauren Delany	Fullback	17 July 1989 (aged 34)	22	(England) Sale Sharks / (Ireland) IQ

== Italy ==
Italy's 31-player squad was announced on 11 March.

Head coach: (Italy) Giovanni Raineri

Player	Position	Date of birth (age)	Caps	Club/province
Laura Gurioli	Hooker	2 February 1995 (aged 29)	7	(Italy) Villorba
Vittoria Vecchini	Hooker	13 January 2002 (aged 22)	20	(Italy) Valsugana
Alice Cassaghi	Prop	21 November 2000 (aged 23)	2	(Italy) Milano
Lucia Gai	Prop	3 May 1991 (aged 32)	95	(Italy) Valsugana
Gaia Maris	Prop	27 July 2001 (aged 22)	27	(France) Romagnat
Alessia Pilani	Prop	6 May 1999 (aged 24)	3	(Italy) Colorno
Sara Seye	Prop	26 August 2000 (aged 23)	20	(England) Trailfinders Women
Emanuela Stecca	Prop	24 February 1997 (aged 27)	7	(Italy) Villorba
Silvia Turani	Prop	6 July 1995 (aged 28)	30	(England) Harlequins
Giordana Duca	Lock	18 September 1992 (aged 31)	43	(Italy) Valsugana
Valeria Fedrighi	Lock	5 September 1992 (aged 31)	50	(France) Toulouse
Isabella Locatelli	Lock	23 October 1994 (aged 29)	46	(Italy) Colorno
Sara Tounesi	Lock	19 July 1995 (aged 28)	35	(England) Sale Sharks
Ilaria Arrighetti	Back row	2 March 1993 (aged 31)	57	(France) Rennes
Giulia Cavina	Back row	15 November 1999 (aged 24)	4	(Italy) Milano
Giada Franco	Back row	11 July 1996 (aged 27)	32	(Italy) Colorno
Alessandra Frangipani	Back row		5	(Italy) Villorba
Elisa Giordano (c)	Back row	1 November 1990 (aged 33)	65	(Italy) Valsugana
Francesca Sgorbini	Back row	7 January 2001 (aged 23)	20	(France) Romagnat
Beatrice Veronese	Back row	11 March 1996 (aged 28)	16	(Italy) Valsugana
Francesca Granzotto	Scrum-half	22 March 2002 (aged 22)	6	(Italy) Capitolina
Sofia Stefan	Scrum-half	12 May 1992 (aged 31)	82	(Italy) Valsugana
Micol Cavina	Fly-half	15 November 1999 (aged 24)	0	(Italy) Villorba
Veronica Madia	Fly-half	16 January 1995 (aged 29)	46	(France) Grenoble Amazones
Emma Stevanin	Fly-half	11 April 2002 (aged 21)	11	(France) Valsugana
Beatrice Rigoni	Centre	1 August 1995 (aged 28)	70	(England) Sale Sharks
Michela Sillari	Centre	23 February 1993 (aged 31)	82	(Italy) Valsugana
Alyssa D'Incà	Wing	23 March 2002 (aged 22)	21	(Italy) Villorba
Aura Muzzo	Wing	12 April 1997 (aged 26)	40	(Italy) Villorba
Beatrice Capomaggi	Fullback	29 April 1997 (aged 26)	12	(Italy) Valsugana
Vittoria Ostuni Minuzzi	Fullback	6 December 2001 (aged 22)	28	(Italy) Valsugana

== Scotland ==
Scotland announced a 34-player squad on 19 February.

On 25 March, Natasha Logan was added to the squad to replace the injured Sarah Bonar.

Head coach: (Scotland) Bryan Easson

Player	Position	Date of birth (age)	Caps	Club/province
Elis Martin	Hooker	23 May 1999 (aged 24)	5	(England) Leicester Tigers
Lana Skeldon	Hooker	18 October 1993 (aged 30)	65	(England) Bristol Bears
Molly Wright	Hooker	13 May 1991 (aged 32)	18	(England) Sale Sharks
Elliann Clarke	Hooker	16 February 2001 (aged 23)	6	(England) Bristol Bears
Christine Belisle	Prop	4 November 1993 (aged 30)	30	(England) Loughborough Lightning
Anne Young	Prop	17 March 2000 (aged 24)	10	(England) Sale Sharks
Leah Barlett	Prop	28 August 1998 (aged 25)	30	(England) Leicester Tigers
Lisa Cockburn	Prop	6 December 1992 (aged 31)	28	(England) Leicester Tigers
Sarah Bonar	Lock	9 February 1994 (aged 30)	36	(England) Harlequins
Natasha Logan	Lock		0	(Scotland) University of Edinburgh / Edinburgh
Louise McMillan	Lock	27 July 1997 (aged 26)	48	(England) Bristol Bears
Emma Wassell	Lock	28 December 1994 (aged 29)	65	(England) Leicester Tigers
Eva Donaldson	Back row	10 July 2001 (aged 22)	6	(England) Saracens
Evie Gallagher	Back row	22 August 2000 (aged 23)	22	(England) Bristol Bears
Merryn Gunderson	Back row	2 December 2003 (aged 20)	0	(Scotland) Corstophine Cougars / Edinburgh
Rachel Malcolm (c)	Back row	23 May 1991 (aged 32)	42	(England) Loughborough Lightning
Rachel McLachlan	Back row	26 February 1999 (aged 25)	38	(England) Sale Sharks
Alex Stewart	Back row	28 May 2004 (aged 19)	0	(Scotland) Corstophine Cougars / Edinburgh
Leia Brebner-Holden	Scrum-half	26 May 2002 (aged 21)	0	(England) Gloucester-Hartpury / Cheltenham Tigers
Caity Mattinson	Scrum-half	17 May 1996 (aged 27)	18	(England) Gloucester-Hartpury
Mairi McDonald	Scrum-half	25 November 1997 (aged 26)	18	(England) Exeter Chiefs
Helen Nelson	Fly-half	24 May 1994 (aged 29)	55	(England) Loughborough Lightning
Beth Blacklock	Centre	13 November 1997 (aged 26)	3	(England) Saracens
Emma Orr	Centre	6 April 2003 (aged 20)	13	(England) Heriot's Blues / Edinburgh
Meryl Smith	Centre	11 June 2001 (aged 22)	13	(England) Bristol Bears
Lisa Thomson	Centre	7 September 1997 (aged 26)	55	(United Kingdom) Great Britain 7s
Cieron Bell	Wing	2 June 2002 (aged 21)	0	(Scotland) University of Edinburgh / Edinburgh
Shona Campbell	Wing	7 June 2001 (aged 22)	9	(United Kingdom) Great Britain 7s
Nicole Flynn	Wing	19 September 2005 (aged 18)	0	(Scotland) University of Edinburgh / Edinburgh
Coreen Grant	Wing	30 January 1998 (aged 26)	7	(England) Saracens
Rhona Lloyd	Wing	17 October 1996 (aged 27)	46	(United Kingdom) Great Britain 7s / (France) Stade Bordelais
Francesca McGhie	Wing	7 May 2003 (aged 20)	9	(England) Leicester Tigers
Chloe Rollie	Fullback	26 June 1995 (aged 28)	61	(England) Loughborough Lightning

== Wales ==
Ioan Cunningham named the 37 player Welsh squad on 6 March 2024.

Head coach: (Wales) Ioan Cunningham

Player	Position	Date of birth (age)	Caps	Club/province
Kelsey Jones	Hooker	4 October 1997 (aged 26)	42	(England) Gloucester-Hartpury
Carys Phillips	Hooker	12 November 1992 (aged 31)	70	(England) Harlequins
Molly Reardon	Hooker	22 September 2003 (aged 20)	1	(Wales) Cardiff Met
Abbey Constable	Prop	18 June 1991 (aged 32)	5	(England) Gloucester-Hartpury
Gwenllian Pyrs	Prop	28 November 1997 (aged 26)	31	(England) Bristol Bears
Sisilia Tuipulotu	Prop	14 August 2003 (aged 20)	18	(England) Gloucester-Hartpury
Jenni Scoble	Prop	28 March 1993 (aged 30)	0	
Donna Rose	Prop	5 June 1991 (aged 32)	20	(England) Saracens
Natalia John	Second row	15 February 1996 (aged 28)	37	(Wales) Brython Thunder
Georgia Evans	Second row	29 January 1997 (aged 27)	25	(England) Saracens
Gwen Crabb	Second row	28 July 1999 (aged 24)	29	(England) Gloucester-Hartpury
Abbie Fleming	Second row	31 March 1996 (aged 27)	16	(England) Harlequins
Alisha Joyce-Butchers	Back row	14 June 1997 (aged 26)	45	(England) Bristol Bears
Shona Wakley	Back row	8 July 1991 (aged 32)	45	
Kate Williams	Back row	5 April 2000 (aged 23)	11	(England) Gloucester-Hartpury
Gwennan Hopkins	Back row	14 November 2004 (aged 19)	0	(England) Gloucester-Hartpury
Bryonie King	Back row	14 August 2003 (aged 20)	4	(England) Bristol Bears
Alex Callender	Back row	29 July 2000 (aged 23)	34	(Wales) Brython Thunder
Bethan Lewis	Back row	19 February 1999 (aged 25)	44	(England) Gloucester-Hartpury
Keira Bevan	Scrum-half	28 April 1997 (aged 26)	59	(England) Bristol Bears
Sian Jones	Scrum-half	3 December 2004 (aged 19)	2	(England) Sale Sharks
Megan Davies	Scrum-half	19 January 2002 (aged 22)	7	(England) Bristol Bears
Lleucu George	Fly-half	12 January 2000 (aged 24)	19	(England) Gloucester-Hartpury
Niamh Terry	Fly-half	30 April 2000 (aged 23)	9	(Wales) Brython Thunder
Kerin Lake	Centre	24 May 1990 (aged 33)	48	(England) Gloucester-Hartpury
Hannah Jones (c)	Centre	14 November 1996 (aged 27)	54	(England) Gloucester-Hartpury
Mollie Wilkinson	Centre	24 October 2003 (aged 20)	0	
Carys Cox	Centre	5 November 1998 (aged 25)	5	(England) Trailfinders Women
Lisa Neumann	Wing	23 December 1993 (aged 30)	40	(England) Harlequins
Jasmine Joyce-Butchers	Wing	9 October 1995 (aged 28)	36	(United Kingdom) Great Britain 7s
Hannah Bluck	Wing	1 April 1997 (aged 26)	10	(Wales) Brython Thunder
Catherine Richards	Wing	21 October 2000 (aged 23)	0	(England) Gloucester-Hartpury
Kayleigh Powell	Fullback	18 February 1999 (aged 25)	14	
Nel Metcalfe	Fullback	17 December 2004 (aged 19)	3	(England) Gloucester-Hartpury
Jenny Hesketh	Fullback	15 April 2002 (aged 21)	2	(England) Bristol Bears
Courtney Keight	Fullback	27 December 1997 (aged 26)	11	(England) Bristol Bears
Amelia Tutt	Fullback	2 June 2003 (aged 20)	1	(England) Leicester Tigers
