= Unione Rugby Capitolina Women =

Unione Rugby Capitolina
- Founded: 2016; 10 years ago
- Ground: Campo dell'Unione
- President: Giorgio Vaccaro
- Coach: Alessandro Martire
- League: Serie A Elite
- 2024–25: 4th

Official website
- www.capitolina.com

Unione Rugby Capitolina Women is an Italian rugby union club, based in Rome. They compete in the Serie A Elite competition, which is the top division of women's rugby in Italy. They are the women's section of Unione Rugby Capitolina.

== History ==
The club was founded in 2016 and initially participated only in the Italian Cup. It wasn't until 2018 that Capitolina registered for the Serie A league. They had a great debut season, finishing at the top of their group undefeated, and playing in the semi-final against eventual champions, Villorba.

The championship was then suspended for the following two seasons due to the COVID-19 pandemic. In the 2021–22 season, Capitolina finished at the top of their group, again having won all their matches, only to lose in the semi-final against Villorba.

At the delayed 2021 Rugby World Cup, Francesca Granzotto was the only Italian player to represent the club. Capitolina had a difficult 2022–23 season, they finished 6th in the Eccellenza championship with only 5 wins and 9 losses. However, they avoided relegation to the Serie A competition.

In 2023–2024 , the Roma women failed to qualify for the top group of the newly formatted championship. They finished second in the lower group. While Francesca Granzotto remained a key player for the national team, the club saw two of its players called up to the Italian national team in 2024, Nicole Mastrangelo, who played in the WXV tournament, and Elena Errichiello, who was uncapped.

== Honours ==
Season-by-season review
| Season | Rank | Competition | P | W | D | L | Pts | Final Phase |
|---|---|---|---|---|---|---|---|---|
| 2018–19 | 1st (Group 2) | Serie A | 18 | 16 | 0 | 2 | 78 | Semi-finalists, lost to Villorba |
| 2019–20 | 4th (Group 1) | Serie A | 9 | 4 | 0 | 5 | 28 | Season interrupted by COVID-19 pandemic. |
| 2020–21 | — | Serie A | Season cancelled | | | | | |
| 2021–22 | 1st (Group 4) | Serie A | 8 | 8 | 0 | 0 | 40 | Semi-finalists, lost to Villorba |
| 2022–23 | 6th | Eccellenza | 14 | 5 | 0 | 9 | 26 | Did not compete |
| 2023–24 | 6th | Serie A Élite | 12 | 6 | 0 | 6 | 27 | Did not compete |
| 2024–25 | 4th | Serie A Élite | 14 | 6 | 0 | 8 | 25 | Did not compete |
