= CUS Torino Rugby Women =

CUS Torino
- Full name: Centro Universitario Sportivo Torino Rugby
- Founded: 2013; 13 years ago
- Ground: Stadio Albonico
- President: Riccardo D'Elicio
- Coach: Alberto Carbone
- League: Serie A Elite
- 2024–25: 6th

Official website
- rugby.custorino.it

CUS Torino Rugby Women is an Italian women's rugby union club, based in Turin. They compete in the Serie A Elite competition, which is the top division of women's rugby in Italy.

== History ==
The women's section was created in 2013. Their first season ended without a single win and a goal difference of –652 pts.

The 2014–15 season saw CUS secure their first victory, it was their only win of the season, however, it was awarded by default because Valsugana violated federal rules regarding the match.

The following season saw CUS finally rewarded for their efforts, the team had found its rhythm in the competition and was finally achieving results. They finished the season, 7th in their group which consisted of nine teams, they had five wins, including a prestigious victory against Valsugana, the eventual champions. The team was penalized twice by the federation, they had four points deducted for fielding a player who was not in compliance with regulations, and another four points for not having an under-16 team. The penalties had no impact on their final standings.

CUS began a steady progress finishing each season one position higher than the previous, sixth in 2017, fifth in 2018, and fourth in 2019. Their progress was unfortunately interrupted during the two years of the COVID-19 pandemic. However, progress continued, and in the 2021–22 season, under the guidance of their new coach, Paul Marshallsay, CUS qualified for the semi-finals but lost to Valsugana. The following season their results were still satisfactory, but they were overtaken for fourth place by CUS Milano.

At the start of the 2023–24 season, the club acquired a title sponsor and were named "Iveco CUS Torino". At the end of the season they finished in first place in the lower group, and Paul Marshallsay departed the club.

== Season standings ==
Season	Competition	Pos.	P	W	D	L	Pts	Final Phase
2013–14	Serie A	6th, Group 1	10	0	0	10	–8	Did not compete
2014–15	Serie A	7th, Group 1	12	1	0	11	5	Did not compete
2015–16	Serie A	7th, Group A	16	5	0	11	18	Did not compete
2016–17	Serie A	6th, Group 1	16	6	0	10	27	Did not compete
2017–18	Serie A	5th, Group 1	18	11	0	7	51	Did not compete
2018–19	Serie A	4th, Group 1	18	11	0	7	51	Did not compete
2019–20	Serie A	5th, Group 1	9	3	0	6	13	Season interrupted due to COVID-19 pandemic.
2020–21	Serie A	Season cancelled due to COVID-19 pandemic.						
2021–22	Serie A	4th, Group 1	10	3	0	7	15	Semi-finalists, lost to Valsugana
2022–23	Eccellenza	5th	14	7	0	7	33	Did not compete
2023–24	Serie A Élite	5th	12	7	0	4	36	Did not compete
2024–25	Serie A Élite	6th	14	5	1	8	25	Did not compete
