= Gaia Maris =

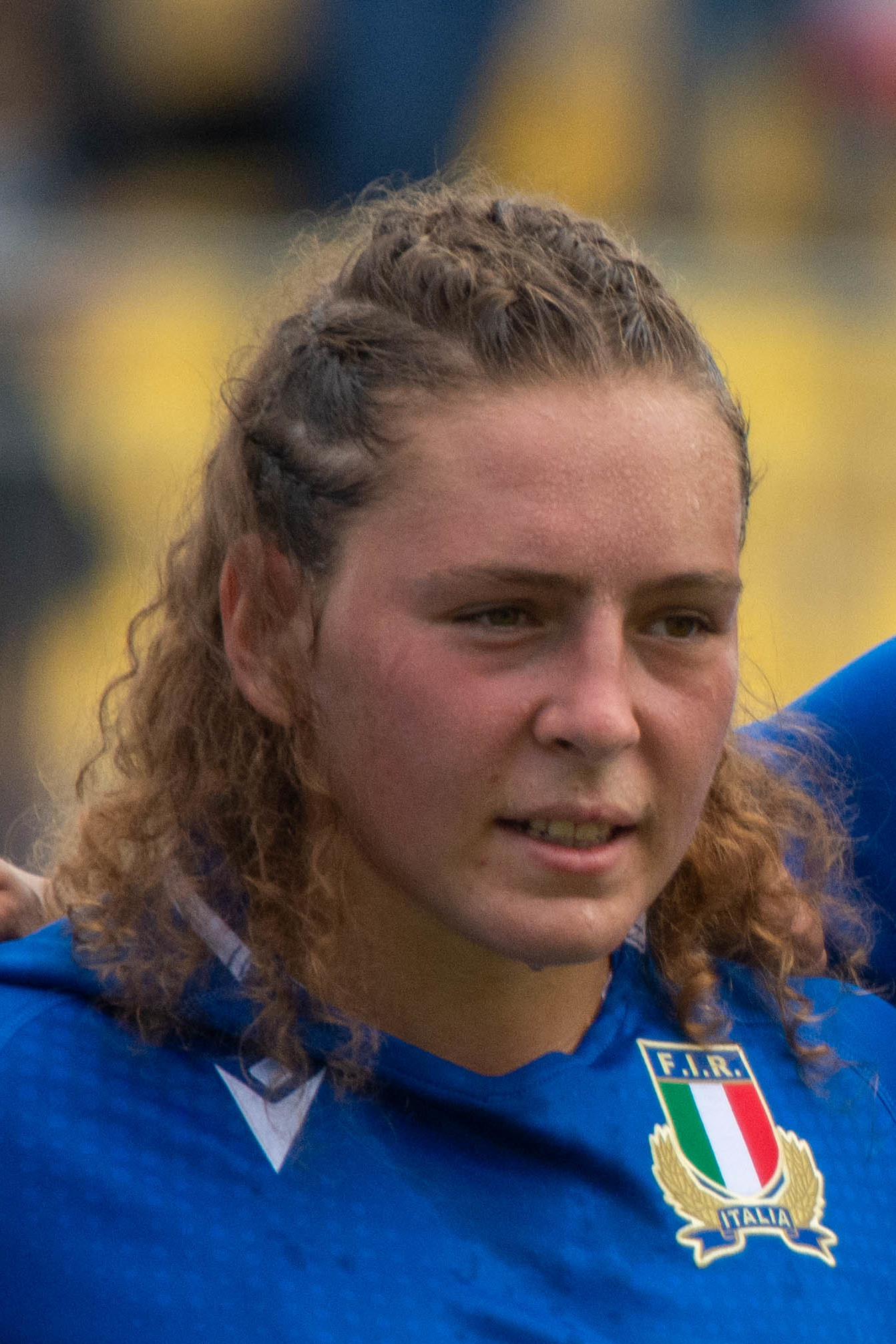
- Maris in 2021.
- Born: 5 December 2001 (age 24)
- Height: 159 cm (5 ft 3 in)
- Weight: 83 kg (183 lb; 13 st 1 lb)

Rugby union career
- Position: Prop
Senior career
Years	Team	Apps	(Points)
2019–2022	Valsugana Rugby Padova		
2022–2023	Wasps		
2023–2025	ASM Romagnat		
2025–	Valsugana Rugby Padova		
International career
Years	Team	Apps	(Points)
2021–	Italy	42	(0)

Gaia Maris (born 5 December 2001) is an Italian rugby union player. She plays Prop for Valsugana Rugby Padova at club level and for Italy internationally.

== Rugby career ==
Maris started playing club rugby for Rugby Trento at the age of 9, she also played for Verona and Villorba before she debuted for Valsugana Rugby Padova in the Serie A competition in 2019.

In 2021, she was called up to the Italian national team for the Six Nations Championship and made her debut in Parma against England, she became the first player from her region to represent Italy in women's rugby.

In 2022, she won the Serie A championship with Valsugana and was called up to the 2021 World Cup squad. She joined English club, Wasps, for the 2022–23 Premier 15s season, but the liquidation of the club and the closure of its professional sector left the players without a team. In 2023, she moved to France to play for ASM Romagnat in the Élite 1 competition. She helped the side reach the championship final where they lost to Stade Bordelais. She returned to Italy to play for Valsugana in 2025.

Maris was selected in Italy's squad for the Women's Six Nations tournament in March 2025. On 11 August, she was named in the Italian side for the Women's Rugby World Cup in England.
