= CUS Milano Rugby Women =

CUS Milano
- Founded: 2013; 13 years ago
- Ground: Stadio Bicocca
- President: Sergio Vicinanza
- Coach: Carlo Ferino
- League: Serie A Elite
- 2024–25: 5th

Official website
- www.cusmilanorugby.it

CUS Milano Rugby Women is an Italian rugby union club, based in Milan, Lombardy. They compete in the Serie A Elite competition, which is the top division of women's rugby in Italy.

== History ==
The club was founded in 2013 and began competing on the national Sevens circuit. In 2018, the club was able to field a fifteens team. The first season was encouraging with 6 wins in 18 matches.

The following two seasons was interrupted due to the COVID-19 pandemic. The start of the 2021–22 season was difficult with Milano only winning 3 of 10 matches. At the end of the season, a partnership was established with French club Stade Français Women.

The 2022–23 season saw the introduction of the Eccellenza championship, CUS Milano finished 4th overall and participated in the semi-finals for the first time in their history, but were beaten by Valsugana.

In 2023–24, the Milanese university team qualified for the top pool of the newly formatted championship and finished fourth. During national team selections, the club was represented by Alice Cassaghi and Giulia Cavina. The latter played in the 2024 WXV tournament, but neither was selected for the Six Nations.

At the start of the 2024–25 season, the team lost Giulia Cavina, who went to play in France with her sister Micol, at AC Bobigny. During the 2025 off-season, the club unveiled a project to merge the senior section with that of its neighbours in Parabiago.

== Rankings ==
Season-by-season review
Season	Rank	Competition	P	W	D	L	Pts	Final Phase
2018–19	8th (Group 1)	Serie A	18	6	1	11	32	Did not compete
2019–20	3rd (Group 2)	Serie A	10	7	0	3	26	Season interrupted by COVID-19 pandemic.
2020–21	—	Serie A	Season cancelled					
2021–22	5th (Group 1)	Serie A	10	3	0	7	50	Did not compete
2022–23	4th	Eccellenza	14	8	0	6	39	Semi-finalists, lost to Valsugana.
2023–24	4th	Serie A Élite	12	5	0	7	24	Did not compete
2024–25	5th	Serie A Élite	14	5	1	8	25	Did not compete
