= Laura Gurioli =

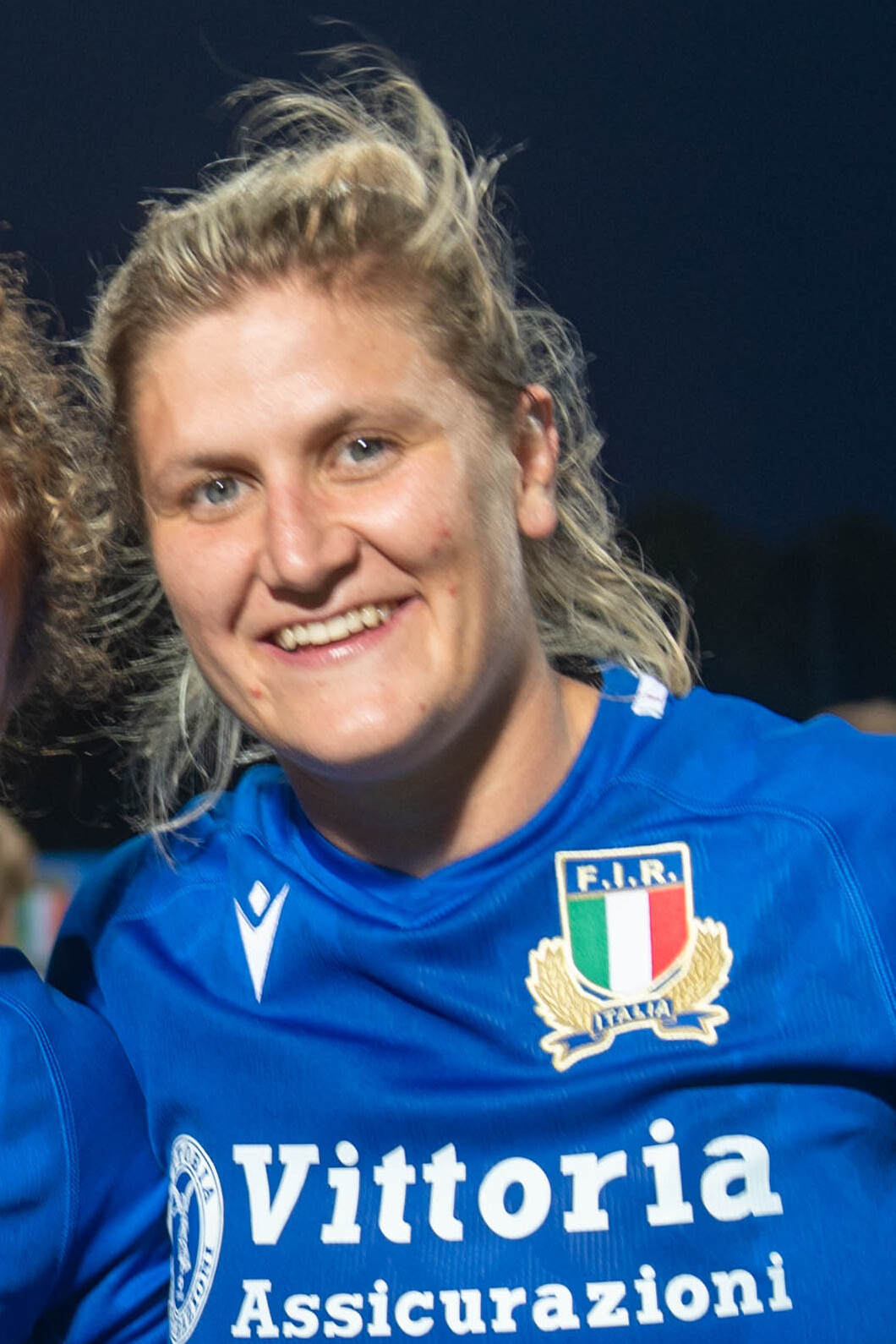
- Gurioli after the match against Spain in Piacenza.
- Born: 2 February 1995 (age 31)
- Height: 169 cm (5 ft 7 in)
- Weight: 76 kg (168 lb; 12 st 0 lb)

Rugby union career
- Position: Back row
Senior career
Years	Team	Apps	(Points)
2012–2016	Imola		(0)
2016–2018	Bologna		(0)
2018–?	Valsugana		(0)
?–Present	Villorba		(0)
International career
Years	Team	Apps	(Points)
2023–	Italy	17	(5)

Laura Gurioli (born 2 February 1995) is an Italian rugby union player. She competed for Italy in the 2025 Women's Rugby World Cup.

== Early career ==
Gurioli was born in Bologna but grew up in Borgo Tossignano, in Emilia-Romagna. She discovered rugby through some Imola coaches who visited her school to recruit youngsters for their junior men's team, arousing the interest of some female students, including Gurioli herself, who joined their women's sevens team a few years later.

== Club career ==
After a period in Imola, she moved to Fenici, the women's team of Bologna in 2016, and made her debut in the Serie A Elite competition. In 2018 she moved to Valsugana and was also involved with the national sevens team that participated in the 2019 Summer Universiade in Naples due to her being a student in Bologna.

After winning the championship in 2019, she was forced to be inactive for two seasons due to the suspension imposed on Italian women's club rugby due to the health emergency following the COVID-19 pandemic. Once women's club rugby resumed, she reached four consecutive championship finals with Villorba, winning two in 2024 and 2025.

== International career ==
In 2023, she made her international debut for Italy against Ireland during the Six Nations tournament.

Gurioli featured for Italy at the 2025 Six Nations competition. On 9 August 2025, she scored her first international try in her sides 33–15 victory over Japan. She was named in the Italian squad for the Women's Rugby World Cup in England.
