= Désirée Spinelli =

- Born: 28 April 2005 (age 21) Florence, Italy
- Height: 165 cm (5 ft 5 in)
- Weight: 75 kg (165 lb; 11 st 11 lb)

Rugby union career
- Position: Hooker
Senior career
Years	Team	Apps	(Points)
2022–2023	Florence		(0)
2023	Benetton		(0)
2023–2024	Puma Bisenzio		(0)
2024–	Benetton		(0)
International career
Years	Team	Apps	(Points)
2025–	Italy	5	(0)

Désirée Spinelli (born 28 April 2005) is an Italian rugby union player. She competed for Italy at the 2025 Women's Rugby World Cup.

== Rugby career ==
Spinelli was born in Florence and played for the local club's under-8 side. She also played for Florentia's youth teams, she then joined Puma Bisenzio's senior team and is currently playing Hooker for Benetton.

In 2024, she featured for Italy's U-20 women's team in the Summer Series.

Spinelli was called-up to Italy's squad during the 2025 Six Nations, she made her international debut in Edinburgh during her side's 25–17 victory over Scotland. She also participated in the warm-up matches in preparation for the 2025 Women's Rugby World Cup in England. She was subsequently named in the Italian squad for the tournament.
