= Sara Barattin =

Italian rugby union player

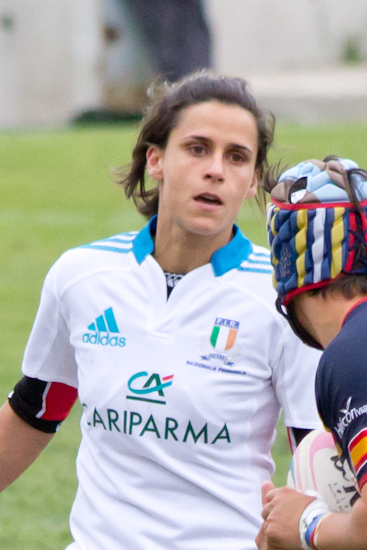
- Sara Barattin in 2013
- Born: 11 September 1986 (age 40) Treviso, Italy
- Height: 1.63 m (5 ft 4 in)

Rugby union career
- Position: Scrum-half
- Current team: Villorba
Senior career
Years	Team	Apps	(Points)
2005–10	Benetton		
2010–16	Rugby Casale		
2016–	Villorba		
International career
Years	Team	Apps	(Points)
2005–2023	Italy	116	(80)
- Correct as of 6 October 2024
National sevens team
Years	Team		Comps
2004–?	Italy		

Sara Barattin (born 11 September 1986 in Treviso) is a former Italian international rugby union player who played as scrum-half for Villorba, and previously for the Red Panthers (Benetton Treviso).

From 2005 to 2023, she played for the Italian national team, where she served as captain from 2016 to 2018. During the 2019 Six Nations championship Barattin became Italy's most capped player overtaking Michela Tondinelli (who ended her international career with 87 caps). Barattin retired from international activity after the 2023 Women's Six Nation with a tally of 116 caps and 80 points (15 tries, one conversion and one penalty kick).

== Sporting career ==
Barattin was born on 11 September 1986. Barattin began playing for the Italy women's national rugby union team at the age of 18. Prior to the start of the 2016 season, she was made the team's captain.

Barattin was captain of Italy as they competed in the 2017 Women's Rugby World Cup, the first World Cup for the national side since 2002. She continued to be selected for the following year's Women's Six Nations Championship as the team's captain, by which time she was the most experienced player selected with 77 caps at the start of the tournament.

In 2022, Barattin was selected in Italy's squad for the 2021 Rugby World Cup in New Zealand.
