= Vittoria Vecchini =

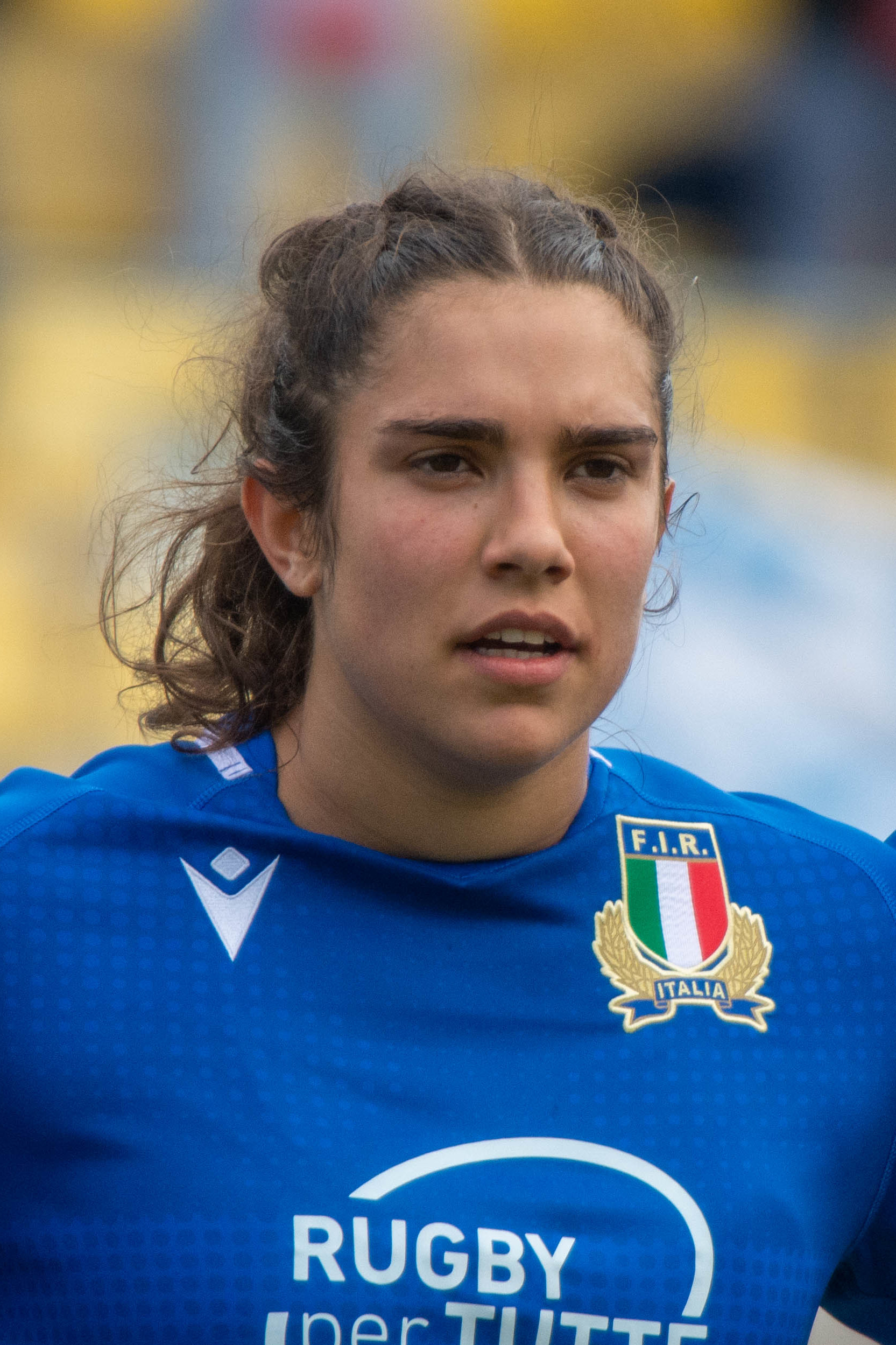
- Vecchini in 2021.
- Born: 13 January 2002 (age 24)
- Height: 163 cm (5 ft 4 in)
- Weight: 80 kg (176 lb; 12 st 8 lb)

Rugby union career
- Position: Hooker
Senior career
Years	Team	Apps	(Points)
2020–	Valsugana Rugby Padova		(0)
International career
Years	Team	Apps	(Points)
2021–	Italy	41	(50)

Vittoria Vecchini (born 13 January 2002) is an Italian rugby union player who plays for Valsugana Rugby Padova as a Hooker.

== Rugby career ==
Vecchini grew up playing for the Badia youth team, in 2019 she joined CUS Ferrara after the closure of Badia's women's section.

In 2020, she moved to Valsugana Rugby Padova where she became a standout player, however, there were very few matches due to the COVID-19 pandemic which saw the cancellation of the Serie A 2020–2021 season.

She made her international debut for Italy on 13 September 2021 against Scotland in Parma, it was a qualification match for the 2021 Rugby World Cup.

Vecchini received a professional contract from the Italian Rugby Federation in 2022. She helped Valsugana win the Serie A 2021–2022 championship and was subsequently called-up to Italy's squad for the delayed 2021 Rugby World Cup which was held in New Zealand.

In 2023, Valsugana were crowned national champions again.

On 11 August 2025, Vecchini was named in the Italian side for the Women's Rugby World Cup in England.
