= Beatrice Capomaggi =

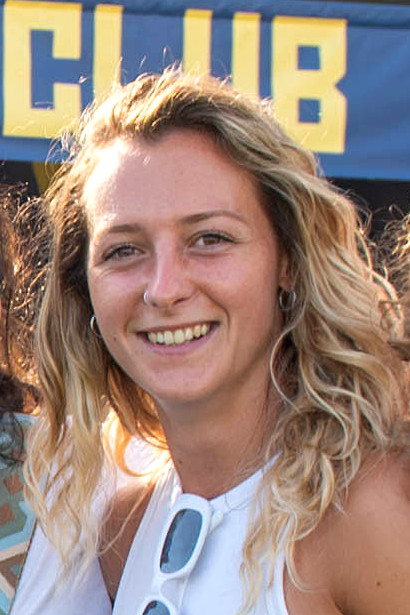
- Capomaggi attending the 2025 U20 Women's Summer Series in Parma.
- Born: 29 April 1997 (age 29)
- Height: 167 cm (5 ft 6 in)
- Weight: 64 kg (141 lb; 10 st 1 lb)

Rugby union career
- Position: Fly-half
Senior career
Years	Team	Apps	(Points)
2015–2017	CUS Roma		(0)
2017–2020	Capitolina		(0)
2020–	Villorba		(0)
International career
Years	Team	Apps	(Points)
2019–	Italy	23	(13)

Beatrice Capomaggi (born 29 April 1997) is an Italian rugby union player. She represented Italy at the 2021 and 2025 Women's Rugby World Cups.

== Rugby career ==
Capomaggi began her rugby career in her local club in Frascati in the province of Rome. She made her Serie A Elite league debut at the age of 18 for CUS Roma in 2015. In 2017, she joined Capitolina while also continuing her studies in motor sciences at Tor Vergata which she began in 2016.

She made her international debut for Italy at the end of 2019, she received a call-up for an end-of-year test match in Bedford against England. She moved to Villorba in 2020, where she reached the championship final in 2022. In September 2022, she was subsequently called-up to the Italian team for the delayed 2021 Rugby World Cup in New Zealand.

She was part of the Villorba side that were crowned Champions of the Serie A Elite competition twice in a row in 2024 and 2025. She was named in the Italian squad for the 2025 Women's Rugby World Cup in England.
