= Rugby Colorno Women =

Rugby Colorno
- Founded: 2002; 24 years ago
- Ground: Campo Paolo Pavesi
- President: Ivano Iemmi
- Coach: Michele Mordacci
- League: Serie A Elite
- 2024–25: 3rd
1st kit	2nd kit

Official website
- rugbycolorno.com

Rugby Colorno Women is an Italian rugby union club, based in Colorno. They compete in the Serie A Elite competition, which is the top division of women's rugby in Italy.

== History ==
The women's section of Rugby Colorno was established in 2002, and were dubbed "White Tigers". They initially competed in the rugby sevens competition as they did not yet have the numbers to form a fifteens team. Due to this reason, several players joined neighbouring team "Lupe di Piacenza" and participated in the 2003–04 Serie A championship.

In 2005, the club merged with Viadana's youth team and were called "Riva del Po", with the joint guidance of coaches from both clubs. The following season they took on the name of "Rugby Colorno FC", and debuted in the 2006–07 Serie A championship where they placed fourth in their group.

After their debut, it wasn't until the 2010–11 season that they returned to the fifteen-a-side tournament and placed second in their group. In 2012, they finished top of their group, earning them the right to play in the playoff stage, however lost they lost 0–51 against Valsugana. In the 2012–13 championship, they finished in fifth place and missed out on the playoff.

In 2014, after the restructuring of the tournament, Colorno topped their group and qualified for the championship semi-finals. They were eliminated by Monza in a double-elimination match, losing 0–30 and 5–56. It took Colorno another three seasons before they reached the championship play-off again.

In 2017, having finished second in their group, they easily won their playoff matches to reach the championship final and achieve their best result up to that point. They met Valsugana in the final and were defeated 32–0 by the defending champions. Both teams met again in the final the following season with Colorno being the victors this time round. They won their first championship and also became the second non-Venetian team, after Monza in 2014, to become Italian women's champion.

== Honours ==
- Serie A Elite:
  - Champion (1): 2017–18.
  - Runner-up (1): 2016–2017.
