= Italy women's national rugby union team =

Italy
- Nickname: Le Azzurre (The Blues)
- Union: Federazione Italiana Rugby
- Head coach: Fabio Roselli
- Captain: Elisa Giordano
- Most caps: Sara Barattin (116)
- Top scorer: Veronica Schiavon (383)
- Top try scorer: Manuela Furlan (20)
First colours	Second colours

World Rugby ranking
- Current: 7 (as of 27 September 2026)
- Highest: 5 (2021–2023)
- Lowest: 9 (2024)

First international
- Italy 0–0 France (Riccione, Italy; 22 June 1985)

Biggest win
- Italy 64–3 Brazil (Northampton, England; 7 September 2025)

Biggest defeat
- Italy 0–74 England (Parma, Italy; 3 April 2022)

World Cup
- Appearances: 6 (First in 1991)
- Best result: Quarter-finals (2021)

Women's World Rugby Rankings Top 20 rankings as of 6 April 2026
Rank	Change*	Team	Points
1	Steady	England	98.09
2	Steady	Canada	91.53
3	Steady	New Zealand	89.85
4	Steady	France	83.60
5	Steady	Ireland	78.20
6	Steady	Scotland	77.39
7	Steady	Australia	75.46
8	Steady	United States	72.90
9	Steady	Italy	72.37
10	Steady	South Africa	71.62
11	Steady	Japan	69.72
12	Steady	Wales	66.13
13	Steady	Fiji	63.98
14	Steady	Spain	62.42
15	Steady	Samoa	59.72
16	Steady	Hong Kong	57.56
17	Steady	Netherlands	57.42
18	Steady	Russia	55.10
19	Steady	Kazakhstan	53.88
20	▲1	Germany	51.10
*Change from the previous week

The Italy women's national rugby union team are the national women's rugby union team that represents Italy at international level. It has been administered by the Italian Rugby Federation since 1991; previously, since its inception in 1985 up to 1991, it was administered by UISP – Unione Italiana Sport Popolari (Italian Union for People's Sports), an association which promotes amateur sports at every level of the society. The team competes in the Rugby World Cup, the Rugby Europe Women's Championship and the Women's Six Nations Championship.

== History ==
On 22 June 1985, the Italian women's national team made their international debut against France. The match ended 0–0, they played again a year later in Bardos, with France winning 12–0. Italy scored their first points in their third match against France when the two neighbors met in Rome in 1987, France won 16–4.

In 1988 Italy participated in the first European championship organized in Bourg-en-Bresse in France by the local women's club. In addition to the hosts, the other two participants were Great Britain and the Netherlands. Italy finished last with three losses. The inaugural edition of this championship, while significant for being the first competition for women's national teams, was never recognized as official by FIRA.

=== Italian Rugby Federation entry ===
In 1991 the management of women's rugby was handed over to the Italian Rugby Federation. Their first commitment was the selection of the team for the inaugural edition of the World Cup which was held in April of that same year in Wales. The Azzurre, after having finished last in their pool, were placed in the Plate quarter-finals. They had their first victory in the tournament after defeating Sweden 18–0 in the Plate quarter-final but lost to Canada 6–0 in the Plate semi-final.

The progress of the national team was slow. In their first 15 years of existence, up to the end of 2000, they played in only 33 official matches. In 1995 they came third in the European championship organized at home in Treviso, a result equaled one year later in Madrid, Spain. After a first round elimination with a sixth-place finish at the 1997 European Championship, they finished 12th at the 1998 Women's Rugby World Cup in the Netherlands.

They finished 7th at the 1999 European Championship and 8th in 2001. They won their first Nations Cup title in Veneto in 2002 ahead of the Rugby World Cup, in which Italy finished in twelfth place. Italy won the 2005 European Championship which was held in Hamburg in Germany. In the 2006 Nations Cup Italy successfully defended their title.

=== Admission to the Six Nations ===
In December 2006, the executive committee of the Six Nations decided to align the composition of all competitions of the tournament with the men's, which included England, Wales, Ireland, Scotland, France and Italy; at the time the only difference with the women's tournament was the presence of Spain, which the committee replaced with Italy starting in 2007.

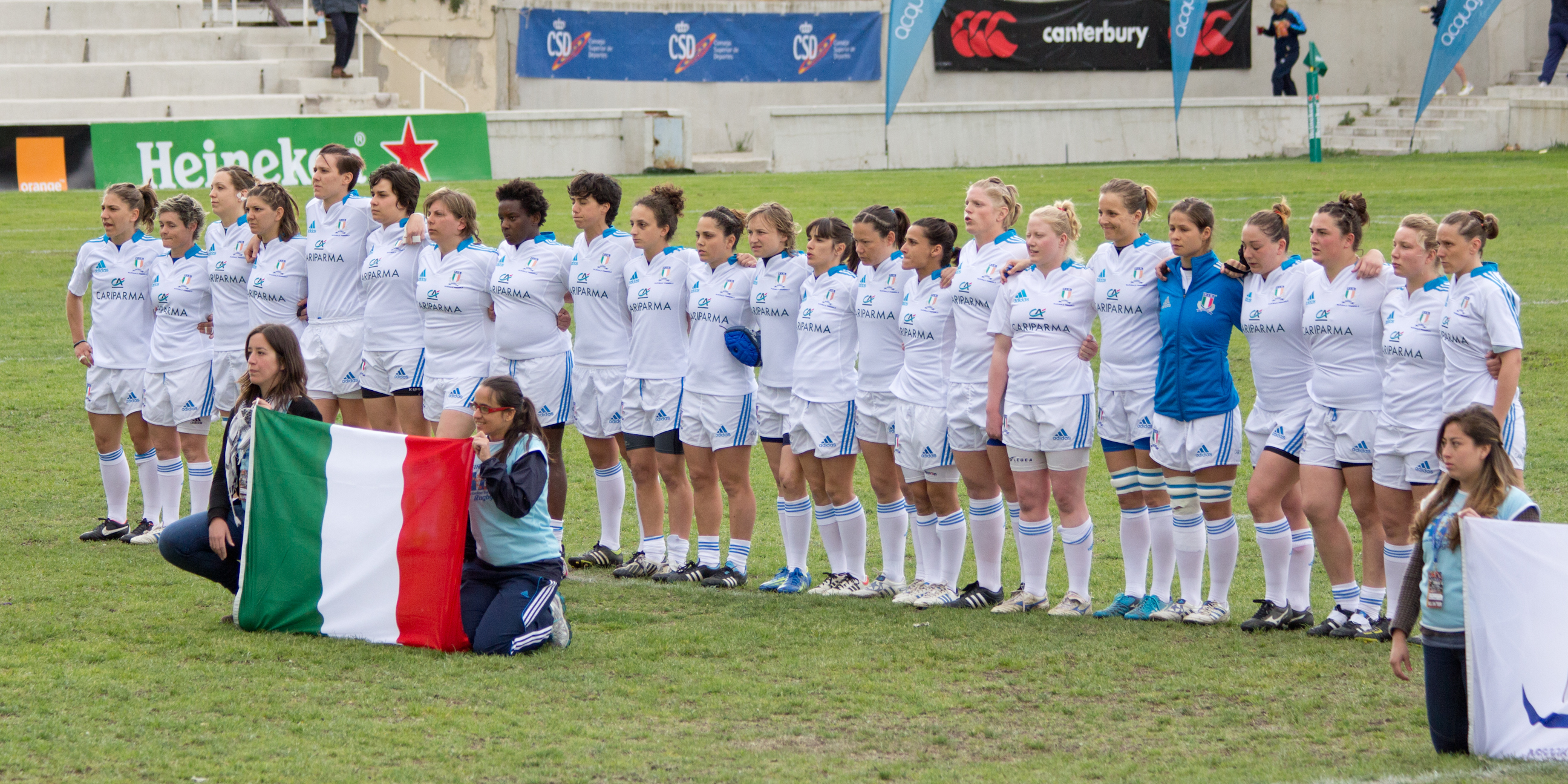
Italy women's national rugby union team in 2013.

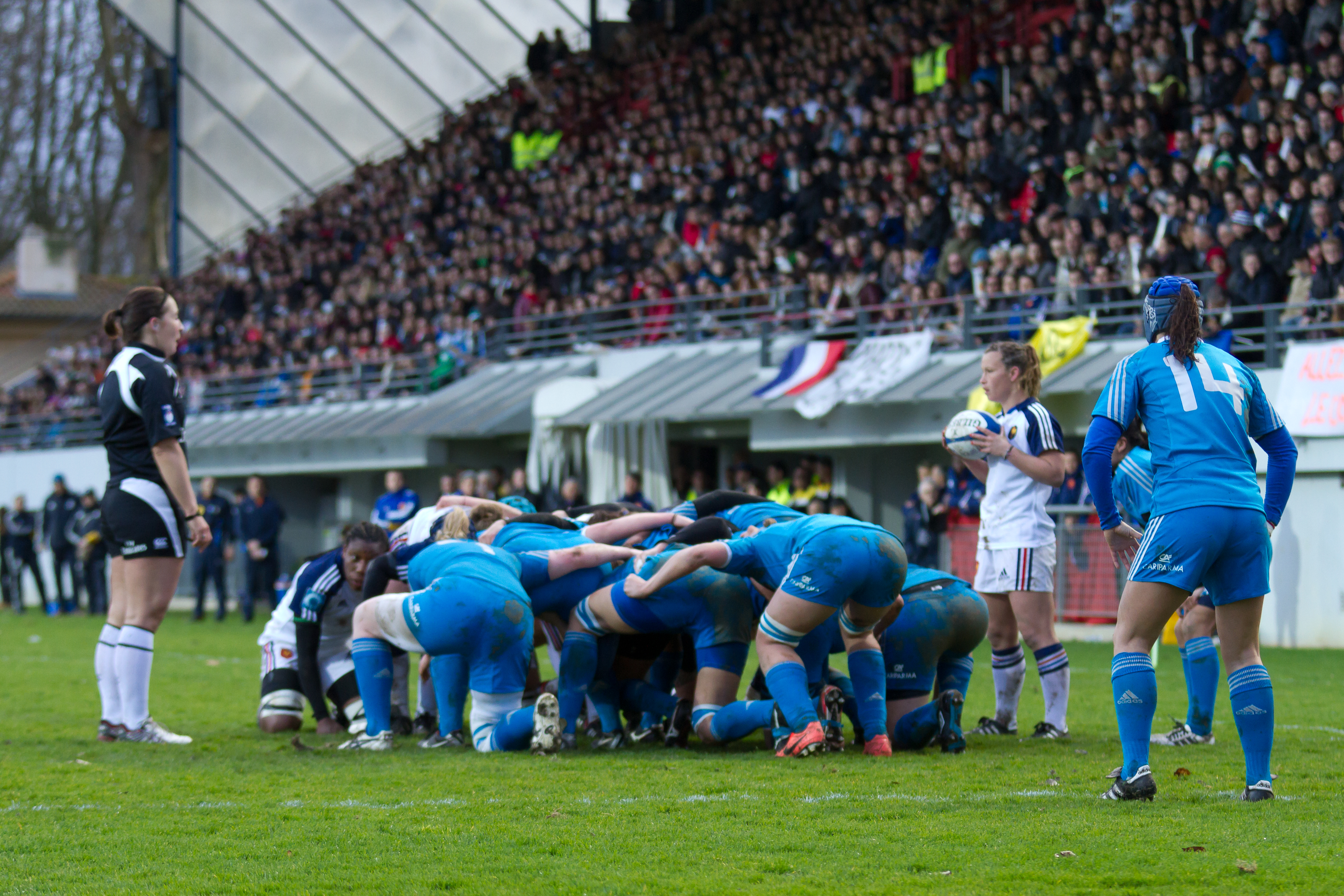
Italy women's national rugby union team in 2014 during 6 nations tournament.

== Records ==
=== Rugby World Cup ===
Rugby World Cup
Year	Round	Position	GP	W	D	L	PF	PA
(Wales) 1991	Plate semi-final	N/A	4	1	0	3	34	31
(Scotland) 1994	Did not participate							
(Netherlands) 1998	11th place playoff	12th	5	2	0	3	108	81
(Spain) 2002	11th place playoff	12th	4	1	0	3	45	121
(Canada) 2006	Did not participate							
(England) 2010	Did not qualify							
(France) 2014	Did not qualify							
(Ireland) 2017	9th place playoff	9th	5	2	0	3	75	117
(New Zealand) 2021	Quarter-final	—	4	2	0	2	58	79
(England) 2025	Pool Stage	—	3	1	0	2	88	56
(Australia) 2029	TBD							
(United States) 2033	TBD							
Total	6/10	9th^{†}	25	9	0	16	408	485
Champion Runner-up Third place Fourth place: * Tied placing ^{†} Best placing / Home venue

=== Six Nations ===
	Italy
Tournaments	16
Outright Wins	0
Grand Slams	0
Triple Crowns	—N/a
Wooden Spoons	3

=== Rugby Europe Women's Championship ===
Competition	1st place, gold medalist(s)	2nd place, silver medalist(s)	3rd place, bronze medalist(s)	Total
European Championship	3	1	3	7

=== Overall ===
See: List of Italy women's national rugby union team matches

(Full internationals only)
Correct as of 26 April 2025

Rugby: Italy internationals 1985-
Opponent	First game	Played	Won	Drawn	Lost	Percentage
Belgium	2006	1	1	0	0	100.00%
Canada	1991	3	0	0	3	0.00%
England	1991	26	0	0	26	0.00%
France	1985	30	4	1	25	16.67%
Great Britain	1988	2	0	0	2	0.00%
Germany	1996	7	7	0	0	100.00%
Ireland	1997	24	4	0	20	16.67%
Japan	2002	8	6	1	1	75%
Kazakhstan	2001	2	0	0	2	0.00%
Netherlands	1988	8	5	0	3	62.50%
Russia	1998	4	4	0	0	100.00%
Samoa	2013	1	1	0	0	100.00%
Scotland	1995	26	16	1	9	61.54%
South Africa	2018	3	3	0	1	66.66%
Spain	1991	15	5	0	10	33.33%
Sweden	1991	8	5	0	3	62.50%
United States	2012	4	2	0	2	50%
Wales	1999	25	10	1	14	36%
Summary	1985	197	73	4	120	37.06%

== Players ==
=== Current squad ===
On 11 August, Italy named their final 32-player squad to the 2025 Women's Rugby World Cup in England.

Note: The age and number of caps listed for each player is as of 22 August 2025, the first day of the tournament.

Player	Position	Date of birth (age)	Caps	Club/province
Desiree Spinelli	Hooker	28 April 2005 (aged 20)	4	(Italy) Benetton
Vittoria Vecchini	Hooker	13 January 2002 (aged 23)	38	(Italy) Valsugana Rugby Padova
Gaia Maris	Prop	5 December 2001 (aged 23)	39	(Italy) Valsugana Rugby Padova
Alessia Pilani	Prop	6 March 1999 (aged 26)	8	(France) Stade Bordelais
Sara Seye	Prop	26 August 2000 (aged 24)	34	(England) Trailfinders
Emanuela Stecca	Prop	24 February 1997 (aged 28)	18	(Italy) Villorba Rugby
Silvia Turani	Prop	6 July 1995 (aged 30)	44	(England) Harlequins
Giordana Duca	Second row	18 September 1992 (aged 32)	58	(Italy) Valsugana Rugby Padova
Valeria Fedrighi	Second row	5 September 1992 (aged 32)	64	(Italy) Rugby Colorno
Alessandra Frangipani	Second row	12 July 2003 (aged 22)	12	(Italy) Villorba Rugby
Isabella Locatelli	Second row	23 October 1994 (aged 30)	55	(Italy) Rugby Colorno
Sara Tounesi	Second row	19 July 1995 (aged 30)	50	(France) Stade Bordelais
Ilaria Arrighetti	Back row	2 March 1993 (aged 32)	62	(France) Stade Rennais
Elisa Giordano (c)	Back row	1 November 1990 (aged 34)	75	(Italy) Valsugana Rugby Padova
Laura Gurioli	Back row	2 February 1995 (aged 30)	16	(Italy) Villorba Rugby
Alissa Ranuccini	Back row	28 June 2000 (aged 25)	15	(France) Lyon OU
Francesca Sgorbini	Back row	7 January 2001 (aged 24)	34	(France) ASM Romagnat
Beatrice Veronese	Back row	11 March 1996 (aged 29)	29	(France) Toulon Provence Méditerranée
Alia Bitonci	Scrum-half	27 March 2006 (aged 19)	7	(Italy) Valsugana Rugby Padova
Francesca Granzotto	Scrum-half	22 March 2002 (aged 23)	21	(England) Exeter Chiefs
Sofia Stefan	Scrum-half	12 May 1992 (aged 33)	98	(France) Toulon Provence Méditerranée
Beatrice Capomaggi	Fly-half	29 April 1997 (aged 28)	23	(Italy) Villorba Rugby
Veronica Madia	Fly-half	16 January 1995 (aged 30)	58	(France) Blagnac SC
Sara Mannini	Fly-half	28 August 2005 (aged 19)	9	(Italy) Rugby Colorno
Emma Stevanin	Fly-half	11 April 2002 (aged 23)	24	(Italy) Valsugana Rugby Padova
Gaia Buso	Centre	19 August 2002 (aged 23)	3	(Italy) Villorba Rugby
Giada Corradini	Centre	17 April 2002 (aged 23)	1	(France) Montpellier HR
Beatrice Rigoni	Centre	1 August 1995 (aged 30)	86	(England) Sale Sharks
Michela Sillari	Centre	23 February 1993 (aged 32)	92	(Italy) Valsugana Rugby Padova
Alyssa D'Incà	Wing	23 March 2002 (aged 23)	33	(France) Blagnac SC
Aura Muzzo	Wing	12 April 1997 (aged 28)	55	(France) Lyon OU
Vittoria Ostuni Minuzzi	Fullback	6 December 2001 (aged 23)	41	(Italy) Valsugana Rugby Padova

=== Award winners ===
==== World Rugby Awards ====
The following Italy players have been recognised at the World Rugby Awards since 2001:

World Rugby Women's 15s Dream Team of the Year
Year	Forwards		Backs		Total
Year	No.	Players	No.	Players	Total
2021	—		12.	Beatrice Rigoni	1

World Rugby Women's 15s Try of the Year
Year	Date	Nominee	Match	Tournament	Winner
2021	13 September	Sara Barattin	vs. Scotland	World Cup Qualifying	—
2023	15 April	Sofia Stefan	vs. Ireland	Six Nations	Sofia Stefan
2024	20 April	Alyssa D'Incà	vs. Scotland	Six Nations	—

==== Six Nations Awards ====
The following Italy players have been recognised in the Women's Six Nations Awards since 2020:

Six Nations Team of the Championship
Year	Forwards		Backs		Total
Year	No.	Players	No.	Players	Total
2022	—		11.	Maria Magatti	2
2022	—		12.	Beatrice Rigoni	2
2023	—		—		0
2024	—		12.	Beatrice Rigoni (2)	2
2024	—		14.	Alyssa D'Incà	2
2025	1.	Silvia Turani	11.	Aura Muzzo	2
2026	7.	Francesca Sgorbini	—		1

Six Nations Player of the Championship
Year	Nominee	Winner
2024	Alyssa D'Incà	—
2026	Francesca Sgorbini	—

Six Nations Try of the Championship
Year	Nominee	Match	Winner	Ref
2024	Alyssa D'Incà	vs. France	Alyssa D'Incà	
2025	Aura Muzzo	vs. Scotland	—	

== See also ==
- Italy national rugby union team
