= Emanuela Stecca =

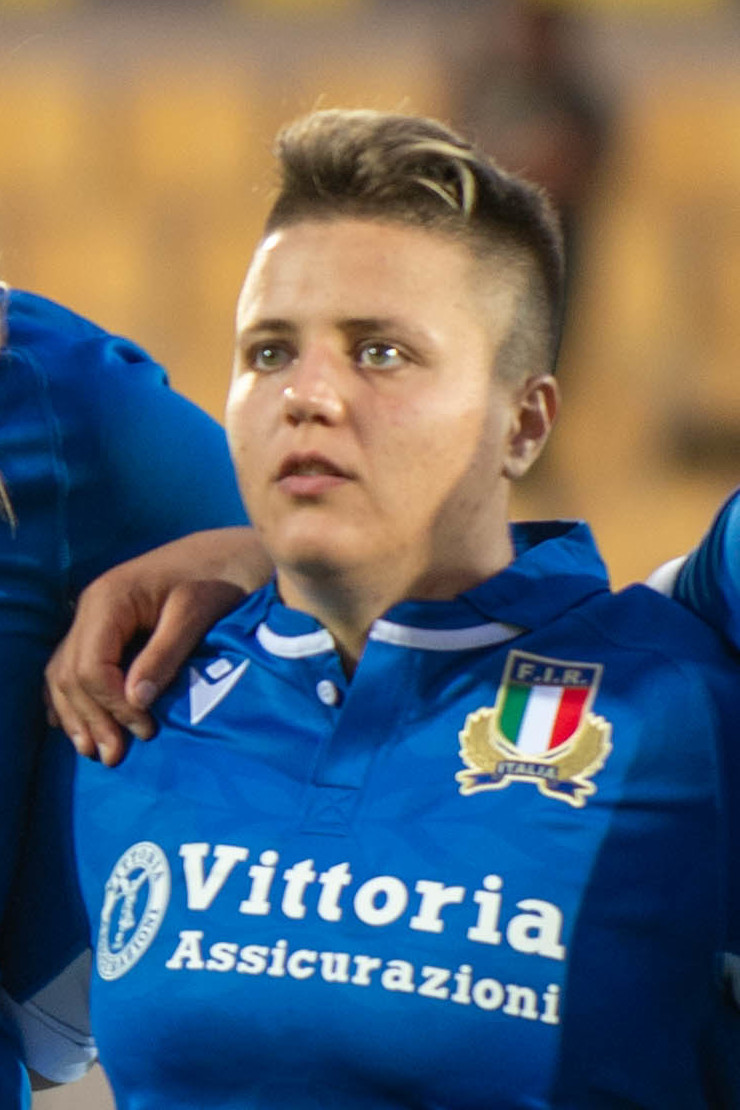
- Stecca in 2023.
- Born: 24 February 1997 (age 29)
- Height: 160 cm (5 ft 3 in)
- Weight: 75 kg (165 lb; 11 st 11 lb)

Rugby union career
- Position: Prop
Senior career
Years	Team	Apps	(Points)
2015–2020	Benetton		(0)
2020–	Villorba		(0)
International career
Years	Team	Apps	(Points)
2022–	Italy	20	(0)

Emanuela Stecca (born 24 February 1997) is an Italian rugby union player. She competed for Italy at the 2021 and 2025 Women's Rugby World Cups.

== Rugby career ==
Stecca started her rugby career in her hometown of Treviso, she played for the Benetton women's youth team, with whom she won the Under-16 championship in 2014.

She subsequently joined the senior team that competes in the Serie A Elite competition, she joined Villorba in 2020. In 2022, she played the championship final, but her team were defeated by Valsugana.

Stecca was called up to the national team in 2021 but did not participate in any matches, she made her international debut for Italy against France in Grenoble during the 2022 Six Nations. She subsequently took part in the delayed 2021 Rugby World Cup in New Zealand.

She was part of the Villorba team that won the Serie A Elite competition consecutively in 2024 and 2025. She was named in the Italian squad for the 2025 Women's Rugby World Cup in England.
