= Alessandra Frangipani =

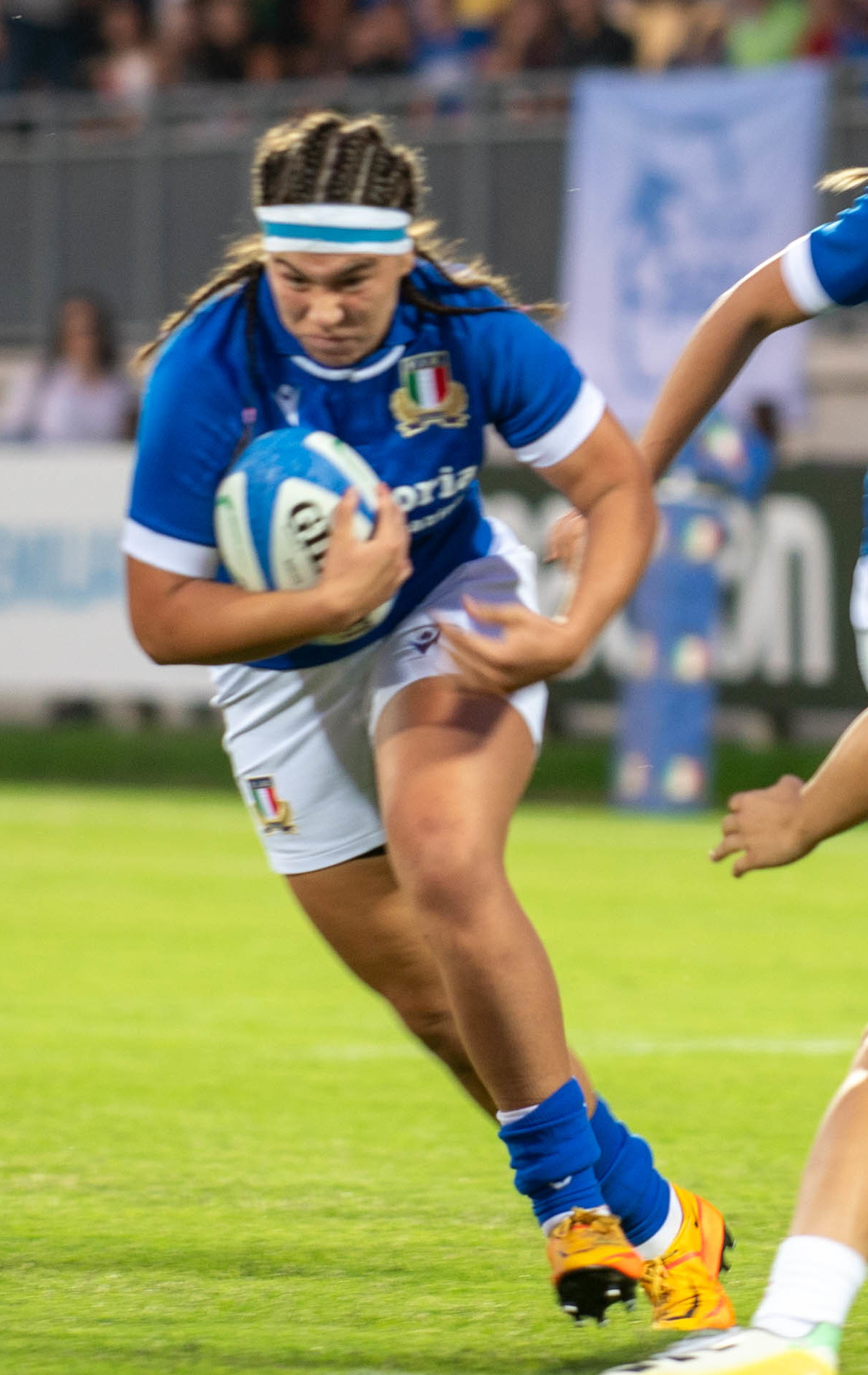
- Frangipani during a test against Japan in 2023.
- Born: 12 July 2003 (age 23)
- Height: 173 cm (5 ft 8 in)
- Weight: 75 kg (165 lb; 11 st 11 lb)

Rugby union career
- Position: Lock
Senior career
Years	Team	Apps	(Points)
2021–	Villorba		(0)
International career
Years	Team	Apps	(Points)
2022–	Italy	13	(0)

Alessandra Frangipani (born 12 July 2003) is an Italian rugby union player. She competed for Italy at the 2025 Women's Rugby World Cup.

== Early career ==
Frangipani was born in Pisa but grew up in Bolzano from the age of five, she left athletics at the age of eleven. At the age of 18 she accepted an invitation from the Villorba women's team to join the Treviso club, which also meant changing schools for her last year of high school.

== Rugby career ==
In her Serie A debut season for Villorba where they reached the championship final, she started in the match in which her side was beaten by Valsugana. She made her international debut for Italy against France in Grenoble during the 2022 Six Nations.

In 2023, they reached the championship final, but once again lost to Valsugana. Frangipani also featured for the national side at the inaugural 2023 WXV 2 tournament.

In 2024 and 2025, she was part of the Villorba side that managed to win two consecutive titles against Valsugana in the final.

She was named in the Italian squad for the 2025 Women's Rugby World Cup in England.
