= Gaia Buso =

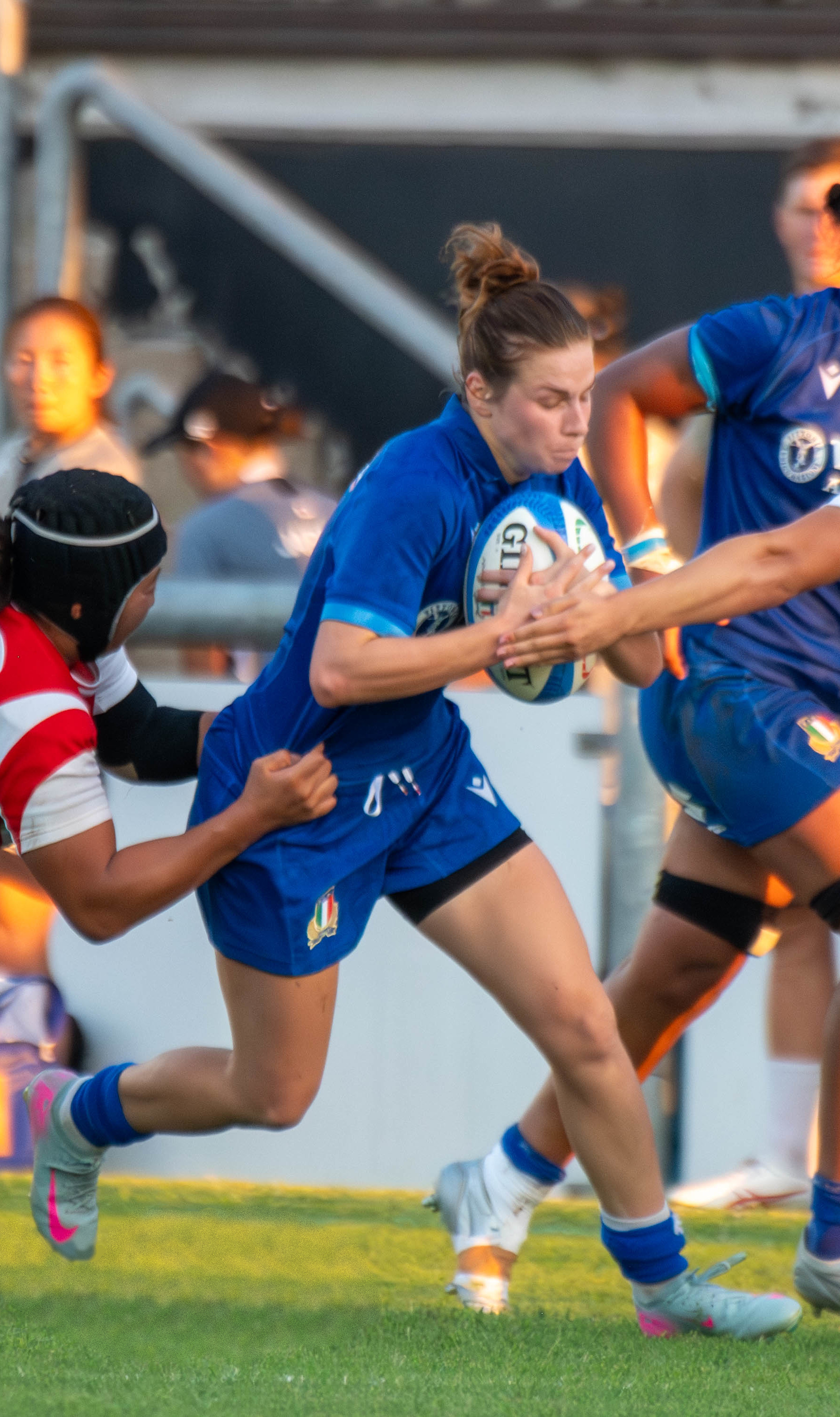
- Buso during Italy's test against Japan in 2025.
- Born: 19 August 2002 (age 24)
- Height: 165 cm (5 ft 5 in)
- Weight: 58 kg (128 lb; 9 st 2 lb)

Rugby union career
- Position: Centre
Senior career
Years	Team	Apps	(Points)
2019–2020	Hove		(0)
2020–2022, 2025–	Villorba		(0)
2022–2025	Colorno		(0)
International career
Years	Team	Apps	(Points)
2023–	Italy	4	(10)

Gaia Buso (born 19 August 2002) is an Italian rugby union player. She represented Italy at the 2025 Women's Rugby World Cup.

== Rugby career ==
Although she lived in Trevigiana, she is originally from Villorba. She played for Villorba's youth teams which she joined at the age of nine. She spent a year studying in Worthing, England where she played for Hove. She was also called-up for the Sussex county selection, although she was unable to take the field for the team due to the COVID-19 pandemic which occurred at the beginning of 2020.

Buso returned to Villorba after almost 18 months of inactivity due to both the suspension of the championships and, subsequently, an injury. She returned to the field at the end of the 2021–22 season, just in time to play in the championship final against Valsugana, which they lost. After she graduated from high school, she enrolled in the psychology courses at the University of Modena and Reggio Emilia, she then transferred to Colorno.

Buso first competed for Italy's national sevens team as they tried to qualify for the 2024 Summer Olympics. She was called-up to Italy's fifteens squad for the 2023 Six Nations although she did not make her debut. She eventually made her test debut the following September during a test match against Japan in preparation for the WXV tournament. She played as a scrum-half, which is one of many positions she can fill, together with centre, wing and occasionally, fly-half, she replaced Sofia Stefan during the match.

In 2025, she returned to Villorba. She was also included in the Italian side for the Women's Six Nations. She was subsequently included in the Italian squad for the 2025 Women's Rugby World Cup.
