= Francesca Granzotto =

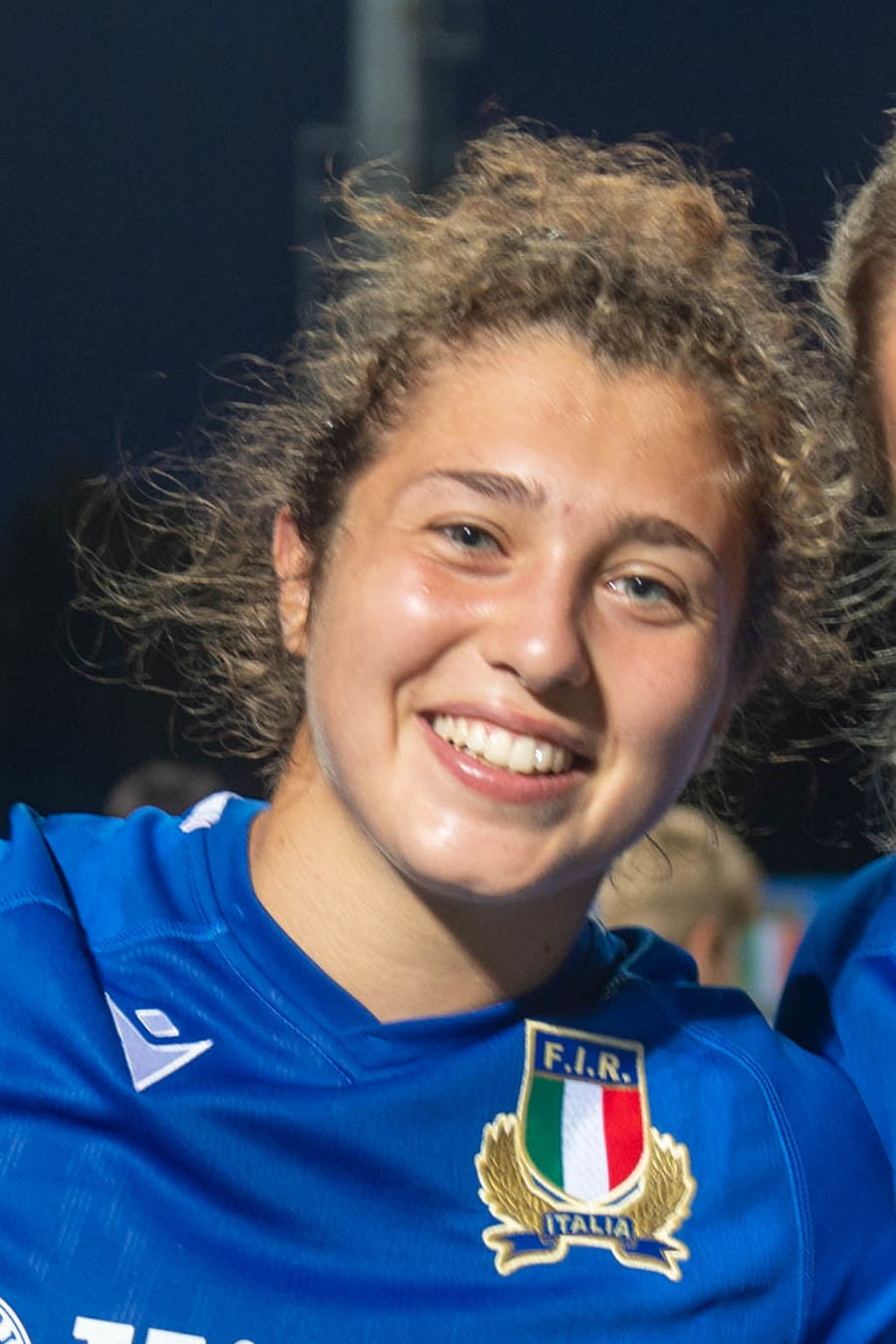
- Granzotto in 2023 after a test against Spain
- Born: 22 March 2002 (age 24)
- Height: 163 cm (5 ft 4 in)
- Weight: 59 kg (130 lb; 9 st 4 lb)

Rugby union career
- Position(s): Wing, Full-back
Senior career
Years	Team	Apps	(Points)
2019–2020	Hove		(0)
2020–2021	Villorba		(0)
2021–2025	Capitolina		(0)
2025–	Exeter Chiefs		(0)
International career
Years	Team	Apps	(Points)
2022–	Italy	24	(54)

Francesca Granzotto (born 22 March 2002) is an Italian rugby union player. She competed for Italy in the 2021 and 2025 Women's Rugby World Cups.

== Early career ==
Granzotto grew up in Conegliano and joined their rugby club as a youngster, she then played for Villorba's youth team, with whom she won several junior tournaments at national level. She spent a year at Worthing College near Brighton, where she played for the college team and for Hove RC.

She returned to Italy and played for Villorba. In 2021, she enrolled at Luiss University in Rome to study political economy, she also played for Capitolina.

== Rugby career ==
Granzotto made her international debut for Italy in July 2022 in Langford, British Columbia, during a test match against Canada in preparation for the delayed 2021 Rugby World Cup. She was eventually called up to the Italian squad for the tournament in New Zealand.

After four seasons with Capitolina in Rome, she returned to England to join the Exeter Chiefs for their 2025–26 campaign.

Granzotto won the Player of the Match in Italy’s last warm-up game against Japan before the World Cup. She was subsequently named in the Italian squad for the 2025 Women's Rugby World Cup in England. She scored a hat-trick in her side’s final pool game against Brazil.
