= Villorba Rugby Women =

Villorba Rugby
- Founded: 2016; 10 years ago
- Ground: Stadio comunale di via Marconi
- President: Julian Cesconetto
- Coach: Federico Zizola
- League: Serie A Elite
- 2024–25: Champions
Team kit

Official website
- villorbarugby.com

Villorba Rugby Women is an Italian women's rugby union club, based in Villorba. They are the reigning champions of the Serie A Elite competition, having won the 2024–25 season.

== History ==
The team was established in 2016, and participated in their first championship in the 2016–17 season finishing in fifth place in their group.

The following season, Villorba reached the play-offs but were eliminated in the semi-final by Colorno. In 2019, they won their first championship after beating Valsugana in the final, which was followed by the resignation of the champion coach, Stefano Tonetto, and his assistant Federico Zizola.

They began the 2019–20 season with a new technical staff, however, the season was suspended and then cancelled by the IRF due to the COVID-19 pandemic; the following season was also cancelled, despite its announcement and scheduling.

The competition resumed for the 2021–22 season, the team held the championship title since the competition's last edition. Under the guidance of former Italian international, Francesco Minto, they reached the final once again, meeting Valsugana who took back their title since losing it to Villorba three years ago.

== Current squad ==
Villorba Rugby squad for the 2025–26 Serie A Elite season:

Note: Flags indicate national union under World Rugby eligibility rules. Players may hold more than one non-World Rugby nationality.

Player	Position	Union
**Laura Gurioli**	Hooker	Italy
Alice Puppin	Hooker	Italy
Vittoria Zoppè	Hooker	Italy
Daria Costantini	Prop	Italy
Rebecca Crivellaro	Prop	Italy
Sara Geromel	Prop	Italy
Gaia Simeon	Prop	Italy
**Emanuela Stecca**	Prop	Italy
Teresa Blaskovic	Lock	Italy
Sofia Nascinben	Lock	Italy
Aurora Abiti	Back row	Italy
Lucia Bonfiglio	Back row	Italy
Greta Copat	Back row	Italy
**Alessandra Frangipani**	Back row	Italy
Kadijatou Lingane	Back row	Italy
Sara Scandiuzzi	Back row	Italy
Rebecca Triolo	Back row	Italy

Player	Position	Union
**Sara Barattin**	Scrum-half	Italy
Emily Brugnerotto	Scrum-half	Italy
**Gaia Buso**	Scrum-half	Italy
Agata Pellegrini	Scrum-half	Italy
Giulia Turrin	Scrum-half	Italy
Elisa Pilat	Fly-half	Italy
Alice Visman	Fly-half	Italy
Federica Cipolla	Centre	Italy
Teiria Jensen	Centre	Italy
Giorgia Pratelli	Centre	Italy
Sofia Stefanini	Centre	Italy
Silvia Bonotto	Wing	Italy
Agata Busetto	Wing	Italy
Manuela De Fato	Wing	Italy
Alessia Liziero	Wing	Italy
Martina Busana	Fullback	Italy
**Beatrice Capomaggi**	Fullback	Italy
**Maria Magatti**	Back	Italy

- Senior 15s internationally capped players are listed in **bold**.

== Honours ==
- Serie A Elite:
  - Champion (3): 2018–19, 2023–24, 2024–25.
  - Runner-up (2): 2021–22, 2022–23.
