= Benetton Rugby Women =

Benetton Rugby
- Nickname: Red Panthers
- Founded: 1982; 44 years ago
- Ground: La Ghirada Sports Center
- President: Antonio Pavanello
- Coach: Walter Pozzebon
- League: Serie A Elite
- 2024–25: 7th
Team kit

Official website
- benettonrugby.it

Benetton Rugby Women is an Italian women's rugby union club, they are based in Treviso and was established in 1982. They compete in the Serie A Elite competition, which is the top division of women's rugby in Italy. They are the women's section of Benetton Rugby.

As of the 2024–25 season, they are the only team to have competed in all editions of the Italian women's rugby union first division championship; both those under the aegis of UISP (1984–1991) and the official ones under the Italian Rugby Federation (IRF) from 1991 onwards. They have won 16 titles (23 including the UISP ones too).

== History ==
Women's rugby in Treviso began to take shape at the end of the seventies, although initially outside the orbit of the men's club, which had just been acquired by Benetton, it was thanks to the other local team, Tarvisium, that the first rugby players in the city found a playing field. In homage to the red social colour of the club, the players took on the nickname of Red Panthers.

The first match played by a Treviso team, the Red Panthers, was in Lancenigo di Villorba, at the old Treviso rugby fields on 13 April 1980 against a representative team from CUS Milano; the chronicles say that it ended 8 to 4 for the Venetians with two tries to one by Bruna Collodo (cousin of then Italian international Oscar Collodo) and Valentina Napolitano against that of Donatella Gentile for the Lombards. In 1982 the nucleus was structured within Benetton.

In 1985, under the auspices of UISP, which had launched the Charter of Women's Rights in Sport that year, the first women's rugby championship was born in Italy, which the Red Panthers participated in victoriously.

Treviso won all seven championships during the management period under UISP; when the Italian Rugby Federation (IRF) recognised and incorporated the women's competition in 1991, the Red Panthers continued to win championships, from 1992 to 2003 they won 12 consecutive titles, in addition to the seven won under UISP, overall they had a winning streak of 19 seasons at the top of national women's rugby.

The 2002–03 season was the beginning of a dualism that characterized the whole following decade: the Panthers would meet Rugby Riviera in 11 consecutive championship finals, claiming five titles to Riviera's six.

In 2014, the first year when the championship left Veneto, the Red Panthers for the first time in their history did not reach the championship play-offs.

As of 2023, the 2015–16 season was the most recent for the Panthers to reach the qualifying round for the semi-finals, they lost to Bologna on free kicks. At the end of the season, due to transfers abroad for work or to other clubs, the club ran the risk of not being able to field the minimum number of players to compete in Serie A and therefore having to play only in the Italian Sevens Cup, so much so that some former players were pushed to register the Red Panthers brand with a notary in order to eventually collect the club's sporting title.

Nonetheless, Benetton managed to present the management staff and the necessary number of athletes to the federation to continue their activity; at the end of the 2022–23 Excellence championship, the Panthers achieved safety on the last day by overcoming Parabiago and finished second to last.

== Honours ==
- Serie A Elite :
  - Champion: 1991–92, 1992–93, 1993–94, 1994–95, 1995–96, 1996–97, 1997–98, 1998–99, 1999–00, 2000–01, 2001–02, 2002–03, 2005–06, 2007–08, 2008–09, 2010–11.
  - Runner-up: 2003–04, 2004–05, 2006–07, 2009–10, 2011–12, 2012–13.
