= Serie A Elite (women's rugby union) =

Top division of the Italian women's rugby union system

- Sport: Rugby union
- Founded: 1991; 35 years ago
- No. of teams: 8
- Country: Italy
- Most recent champion: Villorba (3rd title) (2024–25)
- Most titles: Benetton Treviso (16 titles)
- Level on pyramid: Level 1
- Relegation to: Serie A
- Website: federugby.it

Serie A Elite is the highest tier of the national women's rugby union competition in Italy. It was organized by UISP from 1985–86 to 1990–91, the following season it came under the jurisdiction of the Italian Rugby Federation with the name of Serie A, held until the 2021–22 season. It was renamed Eccellenza for 2022–23 before adopting its current name, Serie A Elite for the upcoming season.

== Teams ==
Teams that are competing in the 2025–26 Serie A Elite season.

Teams
Capitolina
Colorno
CUS Milano
CUS Torino
Neapolis (Napoli)
Benetton Treviso (aka Red Panthers)
Valsugana (Padova)
Villorba

== Champions ==
=== UISP tournaments ===
Season	Winner
1984-85	Benetton Treviso
1985-86	Benetton Treviso
1986-87	Benetton Treviso
1987-88	Benetton Treviso
1988-89	Benetton Treviso
1989-90	Benetton Treviso
1990-91	Benetton Treviso

=== IRF tournaments ===
Season	Winner	Runner-up
1991-92	Benetton Treviso	Perugia
1992-93	Benetton Treviso	Bologna
1993-94	Benetton Treviso	Villa Pamphili
1994-95	Benetton Treviso	Rugby Rome
1995-96	Benetton Treviso	Villa Pamphili
1996-97	Benetton Treviso	Grazia Deledda
1997-98	Benetton Treviso	
1998-99	Benetton Treviso	Villa Pamphili
1999-00	Benetton Treviso	Messina
2000-01	Benetton Treviso	Messina
2001-02	Benetton Treviso	CUS Rome
2002-03	Benetton Treviso	Brenta Riviera
2003-04	Brenta Riviera	Benetton Treviso
2004-05	Brenta Riviera	Benetton Treviso
2005-06	Benetton Treviso	Brenta Riviera
2006-07	Brenta Riviera	Benetton Treviso
2007-08	Benetton Treviso	Brenta Riviera
2008-09	Benetton Treviso	Brenta Riviera
2009-10	Brenta Riviera	Benetton Treviso
2010-11	Benetton Treviso	Brenta Riviera
2011-12	Brenta Riviera	Benetton Treviso
2012-13	Brenta Riviera	Benetton Treviso
2013-14	Monza	Brenta Riviera
2014-15	Valsugana	Monza
2015-16	Valsugana	Monza
2016-17	Valsugana	Colorno
2017-18	Colorno	Valsugana
2018-19	Villorba	Valsugana
2019-20	Cancelled due to the COVID-19 pandemic.	
2020-21	Cancelled due to the COVID-19 pandemic.	
2021-22	Valsugana	Villorba
2022-23	Valsugana	Villorba
2023-24	Villorba	Valsugana
2024-25	Villorba	Valsugana

=== Total wins ===
Club	Wins
Benetton Treviso (aka Red Panthers)	16 (23; including UISP tournaments).
Riviera	6
Valsugana	5
Villorba	3
Colorno	1
Monza	1

== Broadcast ==
Eleven Sports was home to the Serie A Championship from 2022 to 2023.
