= Valsugana Rugby Padova Women =

Valsugana Rugby Padova
- Nickname: Valsugirls
- Founded: 2007; 19 years ago
- Ground: Centro Sportivo Altichiero
- President: Franco Beraldin
- Coach: Nicola Bezzati
- League: Serie A Elite
- 2024–25: Runner-up
1st kit	2nd kit

Official website
- www.valsuganarugby.it

Valsugana Rugby Padova Women are an Italian women's rugby union club, based in Padua. They compete in the Serie A Elite competition, which is the top division of women's rugby in Italy.

The women's section was established in 2007, and have participated in the Serie A Élite championship since the 2010–11 season, they have won it five times, three of which were consecutive from 2015 to 2017.

== History ==
In 2007, a women's youth section was established and entered the Under-16 age group championship.

In the 2010–11 season, a senior women's team was established and entered the Serie A championship. In their first season, they reached the playoff for the championship semi-finals, but were defeated by Red & Blu Rugby.

The following season, they beat Colorno and qualified for the semi-final before being defeated by Benetton in their semi-final encounter. A similar result was achieved in the two subsequent tournaments, after winning the playoff's against the Red & Blue on two consecutive occasions, they were eliminated in the semi-finals, first by Benetton, and then Riviera in 2014.

In 2015, Valsugana won their first championship title, after eliminating the two teams from the capital (CUS Roma and Red & Blue respectively), they went on to beat outgoing champions Monza 9–5 in the final in Parma. They met Monza once again in the final the following year and successfully defended their title. A third consecutive championship came at the end of the 2016–17 season, Valsugana qualified directly for the semi-finals after topping their group in the regular season. They eliminated Monza in the semi-final, and thrashed Colorno 32–0 in the final in Calvisano.

At the 2017 Women's Rugby World Cup in Ireland, Valsugana had the most representatives in the Italian squad.

== Honours ==
- Serie A Elite:
  - Champion: 2014–15, 2015–16, 2016–17, 2021–22, 2022–23.
