= 2025 Women's Rugby World Cup Pool C =

Pool C of the 2025 Women's Rugby World Cup began in August 2025. The pool includes Ireland, Japan, Spain, and defending champions New Zealand.

== Teams ==
The draw for the pool stage took place on 17 October 2024 in London. A seeding system was used for the draw, with teams allocated a seed based on their World Rugby Women's World Rankings as of 14 October 2024. The top four teams in the rankings were placed into band 1 and prepopulated into the first position in each pool. The remaining 12 teams were drawn into bands 2, 3, and 4 based on their rankings and drawn one by one.

Pos.	Team	Band	Confederation	Method of qualification	Date of qualification	Apps.	Last	Previous best performance	World Rugby Rankings	
Pos.	Team	Band	Confederation	Method of qualification	Date of qualification	Apps.	Last	Previous best performance	14 October 2024 (Note: The rankings of 14 October 2024 were used for seeding for the draw.)	18 August 2025 (Note: The final rankings before the tournament started)
C1	New Zealand	1	Oceania	Top 4 at 2021 RWC	29 October 2022	9th	2021	Winners (1998, 2002, 2006, 2010, 2017, 2021)	3	3
C2	Ireland	2	Europe	Europe 1	27 April 2024	8th	2017	Fourth place (2014)	7	5
C3	Japan	3	Asia	Asia 1	27 May 2024	6th	2021	Quarter-finals (1994)	11	11
C4	Spain	4	Europe	2024 WXV 3	12 October 2024	7th	2017	Quarter-finals (1998, 2002)	13	13

== Standings ==
Pos	Team	Pld	W	D	L	PF	PA	PD	TF	TA	TB	LB	Pts	
1	New Zealand	3	3	0	0	156	27	+129	24	4	3	0	15	Advance to knockout stage
2	Ireland	3	2	0	1	85	81	+4	13	13	2	0	10	Advance to knockout stage
3	Japan	3	1	0	2	62	125	−63	10	19	1	0	5	
4	Spain	3	0	0	3	56	126	−70	9	20	1	0	1	

Source: World Rugby

== Matches ==
The match schedule was confirmed by World Rugby on 22 October 2024. Ireland vs Japan will be the first game of pool C.

=== Ireland vs Japan ===
24 August 2025
12:00 BST (UTC+1)

(1 BP) Ireland	42–14	Japan
Try: Costigan 5' c Jones 10' c Parsons 24' c Tuite 37' c Higgins 53' c Breen 63' c Con: O'Brien (6/6) 6', 11', 25', 38', 54', 64'	Report	Try: Hirotsu 29' c Kawamura 43' c Con: Ōtsuka (2/2) 30', 44'

Franklin's Gardens, Northampton
Attendance: 13,053
Referee: Clara Munarini (Italy)

FB	15	Stacey Flood
RW	14	Béibhinn Parsons
OC	13	Aoife Dalton
IC	12	Eve Higgins		(substituted off) 61'
LW	11	Amee-Leigh Costigan		(substituted off) 61'
FH	10	Dannah O'Brien
SH	9	Aoibheann Reilly		(substituted off) 74'
N8	8	Brittany Hogan		(substituted off) 74'
OF	7	Edel McMahon (cc)		(substituted off) 76'
BF	6	Fiona Tuite
RL	5	Sam Monaghan (cc)
LL	4	Ruth Campbell		(substituted off) 61'
TP	3	Linda Djougang	(yellow card) 69'
HK	2	Neve Jones		(substituted off) 61'
LP	1	Niamh O'Dowd		(substituted off) 61'
Replacements:
HK	16	Cliodhna Moloney-MacDonald		(substituted in) 61'
PR	17	Ellena Perry		(substituted in) 61'
PR	18	Sadhbh McGrath
SR	19	Eimear Corri Fallon		(substituted in) 61'
BR	20	Grace Moore		(substituted in) 74'
SH	21	Emily Lane		(substituted in) 74'
CE	22	Enya Breen		(substituted in) 61'
WG	23	Anna McGann		(substituted in) 61'
Coach:
Scott Bemand

FB	15	Sora Nishimura	(substituted off) 61'
RW	14	Misaki Matsumura
OC	13	Mana Furuta
IC	12	Haruka Hirotsu
LW	11	Komachi Imakugi	(substituted off) 68'
FH	10	Ayasa Ōtsuka
SH	9	Moe Tsukui	(substituted off) 61'
N8	8	Seina Saito	(substituted off) 61'
OF	7	Iroha Nagata (c)
BF	6	Masami Kawamura
RL	5	Otoka Yoshimura	(substituted off) 51'
LL	4	Yuna Sato
TP	3	Wako Kitano	(substituted off) 50'
HK	2	Asuka Kuge	(substituted off) 64'
LP	1	Sachiko Kato	(substituted off) 61'
Replacements:
HK	16	Kotomi Taniguchi	(substituted in) 64'
PR	17	Manami Mine	(substituted in) 61'
PR	18	Nijiho Nagata	(substituted in) 50'
SR	19	Ayano Sakurai	(substituted in) 51'
BR	20	Kyoko Hosokawa	(substituted in) 61'
SH	21	Megumi Abe	(substituted in) 61'
FH	22	Minori Yamamoto	(substituted in) 61'
CE	23	Sakurako Hatada	(substituted in) 68'
Coach:
Lesley McKenzie

Player of the Match:
Brittany Hogan (Ireland)

Assistant referees:
Precious Pazani (Zimbabwe)
Amelia Luciano (United States)
Television match official:
Matteo Liperini (Italy)
Foul play review officer:
Andrew McMenemy (Scotland)

=== New Zealand vs Spain ===
24 August 2025
17:30 BST (UTC+1)

(1 BP) New Zealand	54–8	Spain
Try: Miller (2) 13' c, 17' c Mikaele-Tu'u 24' c Leti-I'iga (2) 46' c, 58' m Ponsonby 50' c Woodman-Wickliffe 61' c Setefano 73' c Con: Holmes (7/8) 14', 18', 25', 47', 51', 62', 74'	Report	Try: Antolínez 80+2' m Pen: Argudo (1/1) 35'

York Community Stadium, York
Attendance: 7,458
Referee: Ella Goldsmith (Australia)

FB	15	Renee Holmes
RW	14	Braxton Sorensen-McGee	(substituted off) 51'
OC	13	Amy du Plessis	(substituted off) 41'
IC	12	Theresa Setefano
LW	11	Ayesha Leti-I'iga		(substituted off) 63'
FH	10	Kelly Brazier
SH	9	Iritana Hohaia	(substituted off) 41'
N8	8	Liana Mikaele-Tu'u
OF	7	Jorja Miller	(substituted off) 41'
BF	6	Layla Sae
RL	5	Chelsea Bremner
LL	4	Alana Bremner (cc)	(substituted off) 41'
TP	3	Amy Rule	(substituted off) 47'
HK	2	Vici-Rose Green	(substituted off) 47'
LP	1	Awhina Tangen-Wainohu	(substituted off) 47'
Replacements:
HK	16	Georgia Ponsonby	(substituted in) 47'
PR	17	Chryss Viliko	(substituted in) 47'
PR	18	Tanya Kalounivale	(substituted in) 47'
SR	19	Laura Bayfield	(substituted in) 41'
BR	20	Kaipo Olsen-Baker	(substituted in) 41'	(substituted off) 54'
SH	21	Risi Pouri-Lane	(substituted in) 41'
FH	22	Ruahei Demant (cc)	(substituted in) 41'
WG	23	Portia Woodman-Wickliffe	(substituted in) 51'
Coach:
Allan Bunting

FB	15	Lea Ducher	(substituted off) 57'
RW	14	Tecla Masoko	(substituted off) 66'
OC	13	Clàudia Peña
IC	12	Zahía Pérez
LW	11	Clara Piquero
FH	10	Amàlia Argudo
SH	9	Anne Fernández de Corres
N8	8	Alba Capell
OF	7	Nerea García	(substituted off) 75'
BF	6	Victoria Rosell	(substituted off) 54'
RL	5	Lourdes Alameda
LL	4	Mónica Castelo
TP	3	Sidorella Bracic	(substituted off) 54'
HK	2	Cristina Blanco	(substituted off) 61'
LP	1	Laura Delgado (c)	(substituted off) 41'
Replacements:
HK	16	Nuria Jou	(substituted in) 61'
PR	17	Inés Antolínez	(substituted in) 41'
PR	18	Mireia De Andres	(substituted in) 54'
SR	19	Anna Puig	(substituted in) 75'
BR	20	Lia Piñeiro	(substituted in) 54'
SH	21	Maider Aresti		(substituted in) 69'
CE	22	Alba Vinuesa	(substituted in) 57'	(substituted off) 69'
CE	23	Claudia Pérez	(substituted in) 66'
Coach:
Juan González Marruecos

Player of the Match:
Liana Mikaele-Tu'u (New Zealand)

Assistant referees:
Kat Roche (United States)
Amber Stamp-Dunstan (Wales)
Television match official:
Quinton Immelman (South Africa)
Foul play review officer:
Andrew McMenemy (Scotland)

Notes:

- Maia Joseph was originally named to start for New Zealand but she was withdrawn due to an injury; she was replaced in the starting line-up by Iritana Hohaia.
- No replacements were made for Ayesha Leti-I'iga or Kaipo Olsen-Baker; as a consequence, New Zealand finished the match with 13 players.

=== Ireland vs Spain ===
31 August 2025
12:00 BST (UTC+1)

(1 BP) Ireland	43–27	Spain (1 BP)
Try: O'Brien 7' c Costigan 18' m Higgins 35' c McGann (2) 38' m, 70' c Moore (2) 46' m, 56' c Con: O'Brien (3/6) 8', 35', 57'; Breen (1/1) 70'	Report	Try: Pérez 23' m Román 28' c Peña 43' m Alameda 60' m Blanco 80+1' m Con: Argudo (1/4) 29'

Franklin's Gardens, Northampton
Attendance: 8,834
Referee: Kat Roche (United States)

FB	15	Stacey Flood
RW	14	Anna McGann
OC	13	Aoife Dalton	(substituted off) 62'
IC	12	Eve Higgins
LW	11	Amee-Leigh Costigan
FH	10	Dannah O'Brien	(substituted off) 62'
SH	9	Molly Scuffil-McCabe	(substituted off) 52'
N8	8	Grace Moore
OF	7	Claire Boles
BF	6	Fiona Tuite	(substituted off) 71'
RL	5	Sam Monaghan (c)	(substituted off) 24'
LL	4	Eimear Corri Fallon
TP	3	Linda Djougang	(substituted off) 62'
HK	2	Cliodhna Moloney-MacDonald	(substituted off) 62'
LP	1	Ellena Perry	(substituted off) 62'
Replacements:
HK	16	Neve Jones	(substituted in) 62'
SR	17	Siobhán McCarthy	(substituted in) 62'
PR	18	Sadhbh McGrath	(substituted in) 62'
SR	19	Ruth Campbell	(substituted in) 71'
BR	20	Brittany Hogan	(substituted in) 24'
SH	21	Emily Lane	(substituted in) 52'
CE	22	Enya Breen	(substituted in) 62'
CE	23	Nancy McGillivray	(substituted in) 62'
Coach:
Scott Bemand

FB	15	Amàlia Argudo	(substituted off) 66'
RW	14	Claudia Pérez
OC	13	Clàudia Peña
IC	12	Claudia Cano
LW	11	Clara Piquero
FH	10	Zahía Pérez
SH	9	Anne Fernández de Corres	(substituted off) 71'
N8	8	Valentina Pérez
OF	7	Ana Peralta
BF	6	Lia Piñeiro	(substituted off) 68'
RL	5	Elena Martínez	(substituted off) 52'
LL	4	Lourdes Alameda (cc)	(substituted off) 71'
TP	3	Eider García	(substituted off) 44'
HK	2	Marieta Román	(substituted off) 56'
LP	1	Gemma Silva	(substituted off) 59'
Replacements:
HK	16	Cristina Blanco	(substituted in) 56'
PR	17	Laura Delgado (cc)	(substituted in) 59'
PR	18	Mireia De Andres	(substituted in) 44'
SR	19	Anna Puig	(substituted in) 71'
SR	20	Mónica Castelo	(substituted in) 52'
BR	21	Nerea García	(substituted in) 68'
SH	22	Bingbing Vergara	(substituted in) 71'
CE	23	Lea Ducher	(substituted in) 66'
Coach:
Juan González Marruecos

Player of the Match:
Ellena Perry (Ireland)

Assistant referees:
Clara Munarini (Italy)
Amber Stamp-Dunstan (Wales)
Television match official:
Matteo Liperini (Italy)
Foul play review officer:
Ian Tempest (England)

Notes:

- Linda Djougang (Ireland) earned her 50th test cap.

=== New Zealand vs Japan ===
31 August 2025
14:00 BST (UTC+1)

(1 BP) New Zealand	62–19	Japan
Try: Woodman-Wickliffe 13' m Miller (2) 16' c, 68' m Vahaakolo 25' c Sorensen-McGee (3) 31' m, 50' m, 70' c Tukuafu 35' c Pouri-Lane 39' c Holmes 72' c Con: Sorensen-McGee (4/6) 17', 26', 36', 40'; Holmes (2/4) 71', 73'	Report	Try: Hatada 4' m Tsukui 47' c Penalty try 67'; Con: Ōtsuka (1/2) 48'

Sandy Park, Exeter
Attendance: 13,902 (Note: This fixture was sold under a single ticket with the France vs Brazil Pool D match. The recorded attendance corresponds to the France vs Brazil game.)
Referee: Aurélie Groizeleau (France)

FB	15	Braxton Sorensen-McGee
RW	14	Portia Woodman-Wickliffe
OC	13	Stacey Waaka			(substituted off) 40'	(substituted in) 41'
IC	12	Sylvia Brunt			(substituted off) 40'
LW	11	Katelyn Vaha'akolo
FH	10	Ruahei Demant (cc)				(substituted off) 41'
SH	9	Risi Pouri-Lane			(substituted off) 41'
N8	8	Layla Sae			(substituted off) 53'
OF	7	Jorja Miller
BF	6	Kennedy Tukuafu			(substituted off) 41'
RL	5	Alana Bremner (cc)
LL	4	Maia Roos
TP	3	Tanya Kalounivale			(substituted off) 46'
HK	2	Georgia Ponsonby			(substituted off) 51'
LP	1	Chryss Viliko			(substituted off) 51'
Replacements:
HK	16	Atlanta Lolohea			(substituted in) 51'
PR	17	Kate Henwood			(substituted in) 51'
PR	18	Veisinia Mahutariki-Fakalelu			(substituted in) 46'
SR	19	Laura Bayfield	(yellow card) 43'	(red card) 67'	(substituted in) 41'
BR	20	Liana Mikaele-Tu'u			(substituted in) 53'
SH	21	Maia Joseph			(substituted in) 41'
FB	22	Renee Holmes			(substituted in) 40'
CE	23	Theresa Setefano			(substituted in) 40'
Coach:
Allan Bunting

FB	15	Sora Nishimura		(substituted off) 1'
RW	14	Sakurako Hatada
OC	13	Mana Furuta
IC	12	Haruka Hirotsu	(yellow card) 39'	(substituted off) 66'
LW	11	Komachi Imakugi
FH	10	Ayasa Ōtsuka
SH	9	Moe Tsukui		(substituted off) 53'
N8	8	Seina Saito		(substituted off) 53'
OF	7	Iroha Nagata (c)
BF	6	Masami Kawamura
RL	5	Otoka Yoshimura		(substituted off) 53'
LL	4	Yuna Sato
TP	3	Wako Kitano		(substituted off) 69'
HK	2	Asuka Kuge		(substituted off) 58'
LP	1	Sachiko Kato		(substituted off) 58'
Replacements:
HK	16	Kotomi Taniguchi		(substituted in) 58'
PR	17	Manami Mine		(substituted in) 58'
PR	18	Nijiho Nagata		(substituted in) 69'
SR	19	Ayano Sakurai		(substituted in) 53'
BR	20	Jennifer Nduka		(substituted in) 53'
SH	21	Megumi Abe		(substituted in) 53'
FH	22	Minori Yamamoto		(substituted in) 1'
CE	23	Kanako Kobayashi		(substituted in) 66'
Coach:
Lesley McKenzie

Player of the Match:
Braxton Sorensen-McGee (New Zealand)

Assistant referees:
Aimee Barrett-Theron (South Africa)
Jess Ling (Australia)
Television match official:
Leo Colgan (Ireland)
Foul play review officer:
Quinton Immelman (South Africa)

Notes:

- With her 50th international try, Portia Woodman-Wickliffe became New Zealand's top try scorer – male or female – in test history, surpassing the previous record of 49 set by Doug Howlett.

=== Japan vs Spain ===
7 September 2025
12:00 BST (UTC+1)

(1 BP) Japan	29–21	Spain
Try: Nishimura 6' m Nagata 45' c Kitano 57' m Imakugi 61' m Nduka 69' c Con: Ōtsuka (1/4) 46'; Yamamoto (1/1) 70'	Report	Try: Blanco 11' c Castelo 38' c Rosell 78' c Con: Argudo (2/2) 12', 39'; Peña (1/1) 79'

York Community Stadium, York
Attendance: 3,779
Referee: Sara Cox (England)

FB	15	Sora Nishimura	(substituted off) 65'
RW	14	Misaki Matsumura	(substituted off) 19'
OC	13	Mana Furuta
IC	12	Haruka Hirotsu		(substituted off) 65'	(substituted in) 77'
LW	11	Komachi Imakugi
FH	10	Ayasa Ōtsuka
SH	9	Megumi Abe	(substituted off) 41'
N8	8	Jennifer Nduka	(substituted off) 57'	(substituted in) 65'	(substituted off) 77'
OF	7	Iroha Nagata (c)
BF	6	Masami Kawamura
RL	5	Otoka Yoshimura	(substituted off) 61'
LL	4	Yuna Sato
TP	3	Wako Kitano	(substituted off) 70'
HK	2	Asuka Kuge	(substituted off) 65'
LP	1	Sachiko Kato	(substituted off) 57'
Replacements:
HK	16	Kotomi Taniguchi	(substituted in) 65'
PR	17	Manami Mine	(substituted in) 57'
PR	18	Nijiho Nagata	(substituted in) 70'
SR	19	Ayano Sakurai	(substituted in) 61'
BR	20	Seina Saito	(substituted in) 57'
SH	21	Moe Tsukui	(substituted in) 41'
FH	22	Minori Yamamoto	(substituted in) 65'
WG	23	Mele Yua Havili Kagawa	(substituted in) 19'
Coach:
Lesley McKenzie

FB	15	Amàlia Argudo		(substituted off) 52'
RW	14	Claudia Pérez				(substituted off) 70'
OC	13	Clàudia Peña		(substituted off) 29'	(substituted in) 41'
IC	12	Lea Ducher
LW	11	Clara Piquero		(substituted off) 65'
FH	10	Zahia Pérez
SH	9	Anne Fernández de Corres	(yellow card) 65'
N8	8	Alba Capell
OF	7	Nerea García
BF	6	Ana Peralta		(substituted off) 65'
RL	5	Lourdes Alameda (c)		(substituted off) 54'
LL	4	Mónica Castelo
TP	3	Sidorella Bracic		(substituted off) 57'
HK	2	Cristina Blanco		(substituted off) 65'
LP	1	Inés Antolínez		(substituted off) 65'
Replacements:
HK	16	Marieta Román		(substituted in) 65'
PR	17	Gemma Silva		(substituted in) 65'
PR	18	Mireia De Andres		(substituted in) 57'
SR	19	Victoria Rosell		(substituted in) 54'
BR	20	Valentina Pérez		(substituted in) 65'
SH	21	Bingbing Vergara		(substituted in) 52'
WG	22	Tecla Masoko		(substituted in) 29'	(substituted off) 41'	(substituted in) 70'
WG	23	Ana Cortés		(substituted in) 65'
Coach:
Juan González Marruecos

Player of the Match:
Sora Nishimura (Japan)

Assistant referees:
Holly Wood (England)
Amber Stamp-Dunstan (Wales)
Television match official:
Ian Tempest (England)
Foul play review officer:
Matteo Liperini (Italy)

Notes:

- Sara Cox became the first female official to referee 50 test matches.

=== New Zealand vs Ireland ===
7 September 2025
14:45 BST (UTC+1)

(1 BP) New Zealand	40–0	Ireland
Try: Waaka 15' c Viliko 20' m Sorensen-McGee (3) 37' c, 58' c, 79' c Joseph 80+1' c Con: Holmes (5/6) 16', 38', 59', 80', 80+2'	Report

Brighton & Hove Albion Stadium, Brighton
Attendance: 30,017
Referee: Hollie Davidson (Scotland)

FB	15	Renee Holmes
RW	14	Braxton Sorensen-McGee
OC	13	Stacey Waaka
IC	12	Sylvia Brunt	(substituted off) 69'
LW	11	Portia Woodman-Wickliffe	(substituted off) 52'
FH	10	Ruahei Demant (cc)
SH	9	Risi Pouri-Lane	(substituted off) 63'
N8	8	Liana Mikaele-Tu'u
OF	7	Jorja Miller
BF	6	Layla Sae	(substituted off) 55'
RL	5	Alana Bremner	(substituted off) 26'	(substituted in) 34'	(substituted off) 55'
LL	4	Maia Roos
TP	3	Tanya Kalounivale	(substituted off) 31'
HK	2	Georgia Ponsonby	(substituted off) 67'
LP	1	Chryss Viliko	(substituted off) 55'
Replacements:
HK	16	Vici-Rose Green	(substituted in) 67'
PR	17	Kate Henwood	(substituted in) 55'
PR	18	Amy Rule	(substituted in) 31'
SR	19	Laura Bayfield	(substituted in) 26'	(substituted off) 34'	(substituted in) 55'
BR	20	Kennedy Tukuafu (cc)	(substituted in) 55'
SH	21	Maia Joseph	(substituted in) 63'
CE	22	Theresa Setefano	(substituted in) 69'
WG	23	Ayesha Leti-I'iga	(substituted in) 52'
Coach:
Allan Bunting

FB	15	Stacey Flood	(substituted off) 34'
RW	14	Béibhinn Parsons	(substituted off) 45'	(substituted in) 74'
OC	13	Aoife Dalton
IC	12	Eve Higgins		(substituted off) 74'
LW	11	Amee-Leigh Costigan
FH	10	Dannah O'Brien
SH	9	Aoibheann Reilly	(substituted off) 61'
N8	8	Brittany Hogan
OF	7	Edel McMahon (cc)	(substituted off) 45'
BF	6	Grace Moore
RL	5	Sam Monaghan (cc)	(substituted off) 61'
LL	4	Ruth Campbell
TP	3	Linda Djougang	(substituted off) 61'
HK	2	Neve Jones	(substituted off) 50'
LP	1	Niamh O'Dowd	(substituted off) 61'
Replacements:
HK	16	Cliodhna Moloney-MacDonald	(substituted in) 50'
PR	17	Siobhán McCarthy	(substituted in) 61'
PR	18	Sadhbh McGrath	(substituted in) 61'
SR	19	Eimear Corri Fallon	(substituted in) 61'
SR	20	Claire Boles	(substituted in) 45'
SH	21	Emily Lane	(substituted in) 61'
CE	22	Nancy McGillivray	(substituted in) 34'
WG	23	Anna McGann	(substituted in) 45'
Coach:
Scott Bemand

Player of the Match:
Sylvia Brunt (New Zealand)

Assistant referees:
Precious Pazani (Zimbabwe)
Amelia Luciano (United States)
Television match official:
Quinton Immelman (South Africa)
Foul play review officer:
Matteo Liperini (Italy)
