= List of Spain women's national rugby union players =

List of Spain women's national rugby union players is a list of people who have played for the Spain women's national rugby union team.

== List ==
As of Caps as of 29 March 2025

No.	Name	Position	Caps	Debut opponent	Debut date
1	Matilde Fernández Rico		3	England	06-Apr-1991
2	Eloisa Lorente Catalán		2	England	06-Apr-1991
3	Paloma Loza López		15	England	06-Apr-1991
4	Maria José Maiquez Orenes		5	England	06-Apr-1991
5	Montserrat Martín Horcajo		4	England	06-Apr-1991
6	Judit Martínez Gillve		6	England	06-Apr-1991
7	Mariana Marxuach Pérez Montero		12	England	06-Apr-1991
8	Susan Monclús Twomey		24	England	06-Apr-1991
9	Maria Dolores Moyano Tost		5	England	06-Apr-1991
10	Maria José Moyano Tost		6	England	06-Apr-1991
11	Paloma Peña Fernández		5	England	06-Apr-1991
12	Mariola Rus Rufino		19	England	06-Apr-1991
13	Lidia Sáez Camí		4	England	06-Apr-1991
14	Lourdes Tendero Granda		3	England	06-Apr-1991
15	Mercedes Vega Muñoz		5	England	06-Apr-1991
16	Nancy Villarroya de Jonch		22	England	06-Apr-1991
17	Alicia Yubero Malva		4	England	06-Apr-1991
18	Rocío Ramón Pardo		4	Italy	10-Apr-1991
19	Rosa Vega Muñoz		5	Italy	10-Apr-1991
20	Arantxa Arana Cárcamo		1	Japan	11-Apr-1991
21	Raquel Arranz Muñoz		1	Japan	11-Apr-1991
22	Ana Ayerra Poyal		1	Japan	11-Apr-1991
23	Montserrat Hernández Ibáñez		2	Japan	11-Apr-1991
24	Beatriz Jiménez López		12	Japan	11-Apr-1991
25	Maria Isabel Pérez Garrido		46	Japan	11-Apr-1991
26	Anna Agustí Company		7	France	13-Jun-1992
27	Meritxell Baste Batalla		17	France	13-Jun-1992
28	Yolanda Matías Maestro		1	France	13-Jun-1992
29	Karitte Alegría Mendaza		43		14-May-1994
30	Begoña Díaz Carrasco		1	Italy	14-May-1994
31	Maria Paz Estévan de Meriz		42	Italy	14-May-1994
32	Inés Etxegibel Alberdi		64	Italy	14-May-1994
33	Marta Grant Rodríguez		33	Italy	14-May-1994
34	Maria José Martín González		1	Italy	14-May-1994
35	Mercedes Batidor Llabrés		47	Italy	14-Apr-1995
36	Rosa Calafat Ponseti		37	Italy	14-Apr-1995
37	Olatz Fernández de Arroyabe		42	Italy	14-Apr-1995
38	Amaya Fernández Vázquez		5	Italy	14-Apr-1995
39	Olga Pons Prior		34	Italy	14-Apr-1995
40	Otilia Roca Martínez		10	Italy	14-Apr-1995
41	Beltxa Villalobos Vencela		3	Italy	14-Apr-1995
42	Iriade Manzano Basabe		2	France	16-Apr-1995
43	Pilar López Ferrando		49	England	07-Jan-1996
44	Beatriz Muriel Mencía		42	England	07-Jan-1996
45	Elena Saura de la Campa		1	England	07-Jan-1996
46	Cristina Valdés Serrano		38	England	07-Jan-1996
47	Coral Vila Torrents		43	England	07-Jan-1996
48	Elena Díez de la Lastra		33		10-Apr-1996
49	Lourdes López Ceballos		8	Germany	10-Apr-1996
50	Rosanna Ros Petit		10	Germany	10-Apr-1996
51	Rocío Ramírez Arregui		32	England	05-Jan-1997
52	Cristina López Casla		36	England	05-Jan-1997
53	Aroa González de la Concepción		74	Ireland	02-Apr-1997
54	Montserrat Poza Fernández		40	Ireland	02-Apr-1997
55	Teresa Fuster Amades		5	Netherlands	15-Feb-1998
56	Ariadna Selga Pérez		13	Netherlands	15-Feb-1998
57	Raquel Socias Olmos		39	New Zealand	09-May-1998
58	Eider Barrena Salgado		20	Scotland	06-Dec-1998
59	Naiara Moreno Aburto		1	Scotland	06-Dec-1998
60	Idoia Salazar Arretxea		17	Scotland	06-Dec-1998
61	Ioana Barrena Salgado		24	Wales	19-Apr-1999
62	Olga García Miguel		39	Wales	19-Apr-1999
63	Nieves Simó Claros		1	Wales	19-Apr-1999
64	Nerea Martínez Miguel		30	Scotland	21-Apr-1999
65	Ascensión Herrero Moneo		1	France	24-Apr-1999
66	Maria Teresa Delgado Martínez		27	England	09-Jan-2000
67	Silvia Fernández Izquierdo		6	England	09-Jan-2000
68	Azucena Fraile Molina		1	England	09-Jan-2000
69	Patricia Molina Calero		1	England	09-Jan-2000
70	Estibalitz Uriarte López		11	Scotland	19-Feb-2000
71	Nerea Lasa Alonso		19	France	18-Mar-2000
72	Ana Isabel De La Parte Gutiérrez		28	Wales	02-Apr-2000
73	Otilia Camacho Mendoza		3	Italy	08-May-2000
74	Angelina Masdeu Anguera		38	Italy	08-May-2000
75	Itziar Díez Murga		10	Ireland	03-Feb-2001
76	Elena Roca Moro		45	Ireland	03-Feb-2001
77	Marta Román Cid		2	Ireland	03-Feb-2001
78	Sonia Gallardo Feliu		10	Wales	03-Feb-2002
79	Aitziber Porras Conde		41	Japan	12-May-2002
80	Nuria Casañe Seró		7	France	01-Jul-2014
81	Cristina Casas Campos		4	Wales	15-Feb-2003
82	Ana Isabel Dolera Ruiz		10	Wales	15-Feb-2003
83	Nerea Otxoa De Aspuru		49	Wales	15-Feb-2003
84	Maria del Mar Pérez Martínez		24	Wales	15-Feb-2003
85	Isabel Rodríguez Bergareche		56	Wales	15-Feb-2003
86	Mariona Vila Torrents		18	Wales	15-Feb-2003
87	Elena Buján Francesch		1	Ireland	22-Feb-2003
88	Rosanna Estanyol Marín		29	Ireland	22-Feb-2003
89	Rocío García Eiras		64	Ireland	22-Feb-2003
90	Maria del Mar Martínez Miguel		1	Ireland	22-Feb-2003
91	Concepción Ramos Tallada		16	Ireland	22-Feb-2003
92	Meritxell Urbiola Coma		5	Ireland	22-Feb-2003
93	Beatriz Del Valle Millán		4	England	09-Mar-2003
94	Beatriz García Palacio		5	England	09-Mar-2003
95	Agurtzane Obregozo Bereau		32	England	09-Mar-2003
96	Marta Carreras Espina		16	Scotland	29-Mar-2003
97	Bibiana González Colago		1	Scotland	29-Mar-2003
98	Sonia Jiménez Palenzuela		5	England	14-Feb-2004
99	Laura Gómez Molina		8	England	14-Feb-2004
100	Maria del Carmen Hidalgo Rudilla		1	England	14-Feb-2004
101	Beatriz Pareja Millán		4	England	14-Feb-2004
102	Anna Pico Benet		1	France	21-Feb-2004
103	Bárbara Pla		53	France	01-May-2004
104	Ana Maria Aigneren Frodden		35	Ireland	05-Feb-2005
105	Helena Estévan De Heriz		2	England	12-Mar-2005
106	Lia Bailán Zamora		34	Ireland	04-Feb-2006
107	Berta García		40	Ireland	04-Feb-2006
108	Francisca Natalia Moreno Hoces		10	Ireland	04-Feb-2006
109	Maria del Carmen Sequedo Gallego		36	Ireland	04-Feb-2006
110	Alhambra Nievas		2	England	11-Feb-2006
111	Georgina De Swert Burrull		5	France	26-Feb-2006
112	Maria Victoria Hernández Rebollo		1	Samoa	08-Sep-2006
113	Clara Costa Fabregas		13	Italy	28-Apr-2007
114	Sara De La Llama Van Den Eynde		18	Italy	28-Apr-2007
115	Irene Heras Lizuain		6	Italy	28-Apr-2007
116	Paula Medín		44	Italy	28-Apr-2007
117	Julia Pla Vegue		25	Italy	28-Apr-2007
118	Marta Pocurrul Bosch		17	Italy	28-Apr-2007
119	Itsaso Salazar Berriozabalgoitia		5	Italy	28-Apr-2007
120	Eva Guerra García		4	Russia	30-Apr-2007
121	Marina Bravo		36	England	10-Feb-2008
122	Ángela del Pan		37	England	10-Feb-2008
123	Laura Lladó Martí		8	England	10-Feb-2008
124	Vanessa Rial		30	England	10-Feb-2008
125	Eva Rincón Ortiz		12	England	10-Feb-2008
126	Amets Castrejana Fernández		6	Ireland	17-May-2008
127	Marta Cabané Pascual		9	England	07-Feb-2009
128	Begoña Jiménez Ocio		1	England	14-May-1994
129	Marta Lliteras Ruiz		11	England	07-Feb-2009
130	Tania Marxell Piñón		1	England	07-Feb-2009
131	Elisabet Martínez		17	England	14-Feb-2010
132	María Ribera		30	England	14-Feb-2010
133	Patricia García		44	Netherlands	08-May-2010
134	Meritxell Carreras Gruat		3	Scotland	03-Jan-2011
135	Laura Esbrí Antón		8	Scotland	03-Jan-2011
136	Judit Rius Camprubí		1	Scotland	03-Jan-2011
137	Isis Velazco Morán		6	Scotland	03-Jan-2011
138	Ana Crespo Ramírez		3	Finland	30-Apr-2011
139	Anna Arnau Vidal		7	England	12-May-2012
140	Marina Cabré Castells		2	England	12-May-2012
141	Marta Calviño Forján		3	England	12-May-2012
142	Alexandra Castillón Serrano		5	England	12-May-2012
143	Carina Castillón Serrano		3	England	12-May-2012
144	Maria del Carmen Gallego Sánchez		3	England	12-May-2012
145	Bibiana González-Colaço Yañez-Sedeño		2	England	12-May-2012
146	Micaela Martínez Benavente		3	England	12-May-2012
147	Lorena Martínez Gutiérrez		1	England	12-May-2012
148	Elena Redondo Casado		22	England	12-May-2012
149	Isabel Rico Vázquez		37	England	12-May-2012
150	Raquel Santiago Álvarez		3	England	12-May-2012
151	Irene Schiavon Matteo		17	England	12-May-2012
152	Cristina Yanara Soriano Palomo		3	England	12-May-2012
153	Mónica Castelo		30	France	15-May-2012
154	Marta Costa Fabregas		2	France	15-May-2012
155	María Sobrinos Martín		2	France	15-May-2012
156	María Casado		14	Italy	09-Dec-2012
157	Diana Gasso García		19	Italy	09-Dec-2012
158	Lourdes Alameda		45	Netherlands	23-Apr-2013
159	Saioa Jaurena Atxa		28	Italy	27-Apr-2013
160	Nuria Carreras		1	France	01-Jul-2014
161	Iera Echebarría		24	France	01-Jul-2014
162	África Felez Barragán		4	France	01-Jul-2014
163	Tania Ortega Moreno		3	France	01-Jul-2014
164	Elsa Porto Vieiras		3	France	01-Jul-2014
165	Nerea Agirre Moragues		1	Hong Kong	19-Dec-2015
166	Claudia Arranz Alonso		1	Hong Kong	19-Dec-2015
167	Macarena Del Valle Gelineau		1	Hong Kong	19-Dec-2015
168	Lucía Díaz Martín		31	Hong Kong	19-Dec-2015
169	Amaia Erbina		23	Hong Kong	20-Dec-2015
170	Anne Fernández de Corres		38	Hong Kong	19-Dec-2015
171	Isabel Macías Valcayo		20	Hong Kong	19-Dec-2015
172	Carlota Meliz Pérez		6	Hong Kong	19-Dec-2015
173	Magdalena Pérez Galmes		1	Hong Kong	19-Dec-2015
174	Carmen Pérez Ruiz		6	Hong Kong	19-Dec-2015
175	Anna Ramón Guardia		4	Hong Kong	19-Dec-2015
176	Selene Roz Cortina		1	Hong Kong	19-Dec-2015
177	Jeanina Alejandra Vinueza Loyola		14	Hong Kong	19-Dec-2015
178	Nuria Yurrita Coll		1	Hong Kong	19-Dec-2015
179	Maria Losada Gifra		13	Belgium	06-Oct-2016
180	Laura Delgado Dueñas		53	Belgium	06-Oct-2016
181	Enara Cacho Gabilondo		1	Czech Republic	09-Oct-2016
182	Ángela Soria Mazcunan		1	Czech Republic	09-Oct-2016
183	Ingrid Algar González		4	Hong Kong	03-Jun-2017
184	Uribarri Barrutieta Barrenetxea		7	Hong Kong	03-Jun-2017
185	Elisa Castro Camarero		1	Hong Kong	03-Jun-2017
186	Raquel García Godín		1	Hong Kong	03-Jun-2017
187	Sabina Hurtado Vaquerizo		8	Hong Kong	03-Jun-2017
188	Idoia Olabarrieta Arranz		1	Hong Kong	03-Jun-2017
189	Maria Ahís Adell		11	England	09-Aug-2017
190	Bárbara García Ordoñez		1	Italy	17-Aug-2017
191	Eva Aguirre Díez		8	Germany	27-Feb-2018
192	Maria Calvo Balaguer		28	Germany	27-Feb-2018
193	Lide Erbina Araña		8	Germany	27-Feb-2018
194	Maria García Gala		12	Germany	27-Feb-2018
195	Jimena Parra Llorente		2	Germany	27-Feb-2018
196	Anna Puig		38	Germany	27-Feb-2018
197	Margarita Rodríguez Gómez		14	Germany	27-Feb-2018
198	Maitane Salinas Lizoain		5	Germany	27-Feb-2018
199	Judith Vélez Gallardo		2	Germany	27-Feb-2018
200	Alba Vinuesa		36	Germany	27-Feb-2018
201	Marta Carmona Pérez		5	Netherlands	03-Mar-2018
202	Mayka Brust		12	Hong Kong	11-Nov-2018
203	Marta Estellés Chaparro		11	Hong Kong	11-Nov-2018
204	Olivia Fresneda Fernández		12	Hong Kong	11-Nov-2018
205	Ruth Hernando Martínez		2	Hong Kong	11-Nov-2018
206	Carla Rodríguez Martínez		4	Hong Kong	11-Nov-2018
207	Paula Requena Zamora		6	Hong Kong	11-Nov-2018
208	Inmaculada Bargues Celda		1	Russia	23-Feb-2019
209	Carmen Rodera Leguey		8	Russia	23-Feb-2019
210	Beatriz Domínguez Sánchez		7	Netherlands	30-Mar-2019
211	Cristina Blanco		34	South Africa	21-Sep-2019
212	Inés Bueso Inchausti		18	South Africa	21-Sep-2019
213	Iciar Pozo Eizaguirre		10	South Africa	21-Sep-2019
214	Amàlia Argudo		29	Scotland	19-Jan-2020
215	Paula Gil Martín		1	Scotland	19-Jan-2020
216	Elisabeth Segarra Cararach		3	Scotland	19-Jan-2020
217	Carmen Castellucci		22	Russia	20-Feb-2021
218	Sidorella Bracic		30	Netherlands	27-Feb-2021
219	Lea Ducher		12	Ireland	13-Sep-2021
220	Julia Castro		11	Netherlands	19-Feb-2022
221	Aleuzenev Cid		2	Netherlands	19-Feb-2022
222	Bruna Elias		2	Netherlands	19-Feb-2022
223	Nuria Jou		14	Netherlands	19-Feb-2022
224	Cristina López		4	Netherlands	19-Feb-2022
225	Zahía Pérez		33	Netherlands	19-Feb-2022
226	Clara Piquero		31	Netherlands	19-Feb-2022
227	Clàudia Peña		29	Russia	27-Feb-2022
228	Maria de las Huertas Román		25	Russia	26-Feb-2022
229	Alba Capell		31	South Africa	13-Aug-2022
230	Blanca Ruiz		3	South Africa	13-Aug-2022
231	Maria Del Castillo		15	South Africa	13-Aug-2022
232	Kassandra Sylla		5	South Africa	19-Aug-2022
233	Lucía Gayoso		5	South Africa	19-Aug-2022
234	Claudia Pérez		21	Netherlands	19-Feb-2023
235	Maider Aresti		14	Netherlands	19-Feb-2023
236	Cecilia Huarte		3	Netherlands	19-Feb-2023
237	Alba Alpin		3	Netherlands	19-Feb-2023
238	Ana Peralta		11	Netherlands	19-Feb-2023
239	Maria Miguel		3	Netherlands	19-Feb-2023
240	Vico Gorrochategui		11	Sweden	25-Feb-2023
241	Inés Antolínez		25	Sweden	25-Feb-2023
242	Cristina García Terrón		3	Sweden	25-Feb-2023
243	Nerea García		18	United States	25-Mar-2023
244	Elena Martínez		10	Japan	15-Jul-2023
245	Sara Martori		1	Japan	15-Jul-2023
246	Sara Rodríguez		1	Japan	15-Jul-2023
247	Bingbing Vergara		12	Scotland	30-Sep-2023
248	Jimena Blanco Hortiguera		1	Scotland	30-Sep-2023
249	Leyre Bianchi		2	Scotland	30-Sep-2023
250	Nadina Cisa		14	Kenya	14-Oct-2023
251	Tecla Masoko		11	Italy	11-Feb-2023
252	Lia Piñeiro		14	South Africa	23-Mar-2024
253	Claudia Cano		17	South Africa	23-Mar-2024
254	Mireia De Andrés		12	South Africa	23-Mar-2024
255	Martina Márquez		7	Portugal	30-Mar-2024
256	Beatriz Rivera		3	Portugal	30-Mar-2024
257	Judith Hernández		1	Portugal	30-Mar-2024
258	Valentina Pérez		10	Netherlands	06-Apr-2024
259	Gemma Silva		9	Sweden	13-Apr-2024
260	Matilda Toca Altes		1	Sweden	13-Apr-2024
261	Naroa Azpitarte		4	Sweden	13-Apr-2024
262	Estrella Gago		1	Sweden	13-Apr-2024
263	Victoria Rosell		9	Brazil	22-Mar-2025
264	Eider García		9	Brazil	22-Mar-2025
265	Ana Cortés Ekobo		6	Brazil	22-Mar-2025
266	Belsay Escudero		2	Portugal	29-Mar-2025
