= York Community Stadium =

Multi-purpose stadium in Huntington, England

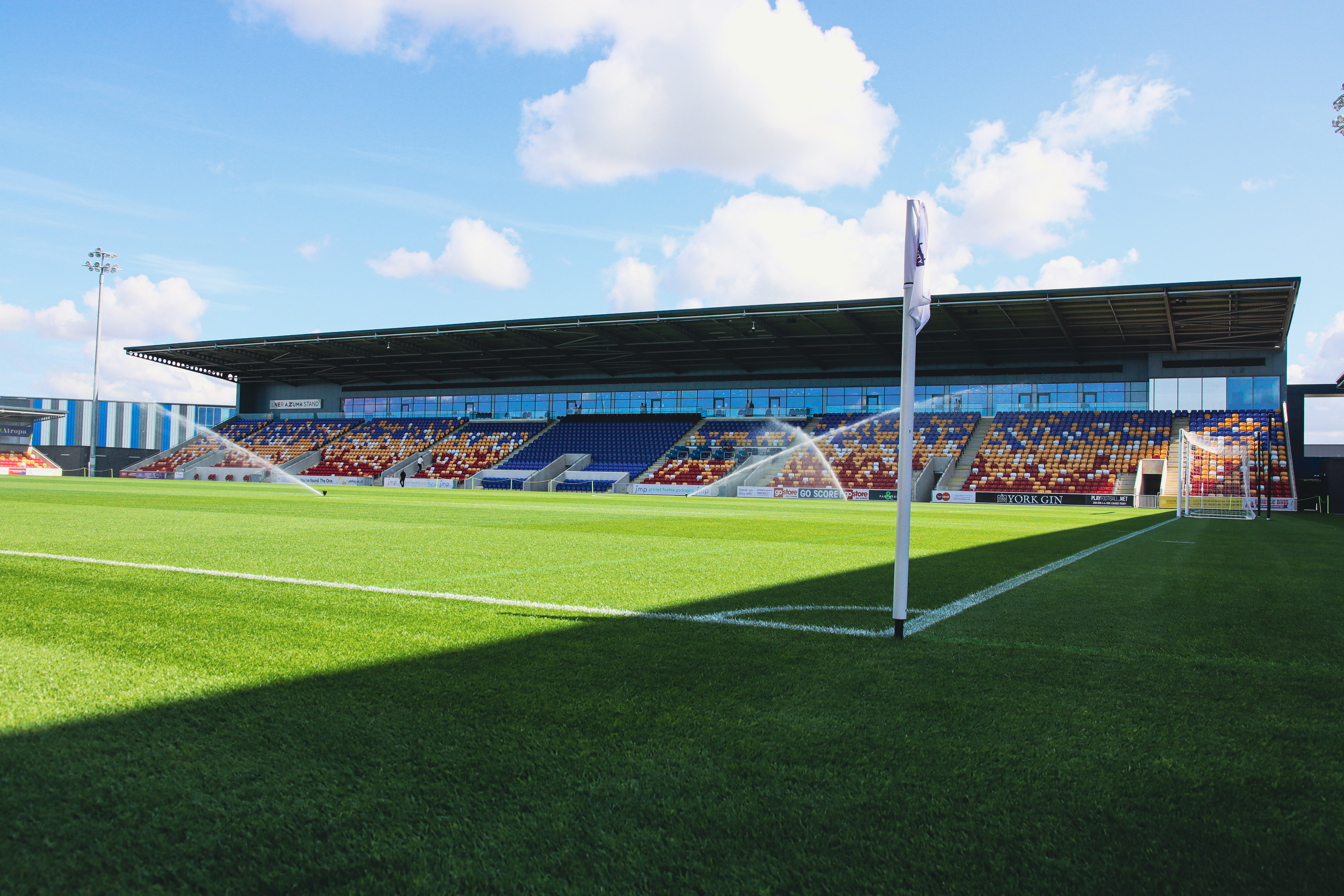
- The East stand of the York Community Stadium

- Location of York Community Stadium
- Full name: York Community Stadium
- Location: Huntington, York, England
- Coordinates: 53°59′05″N 1°03′10″W
- Owner: City of York Council
- Operator: Greenwich Leisure Limited and York Stadium Management Company
- Capacity: 8,500
- Surface: Reinforced natural grass
- Record attendance: 8,402 (2025 Challenge Cup Semi Final): Hull KR vs Catalans Dragons – (10 May 2025)
- Field size: 105 by 68 metres (115 by 74 yd) (football); 100 by 68 metres (109 by 74 yd) (rugby league)
- Public transit: York (train) Monks Cross Car Park (bus)

Construction
- Groundbreaking: 4 December 2017
- Built: 2017–2021
- Opened: February 2021
- Cost: £44.2 million
- Architect: Greenwich Leisure

Tenants
- York City F.C. (2021–present); York RLFC (2021–present); York Valkyrie (2022-present); Hull City Academy (2021–present); Leeds United Academy (2021–present); Sheffield United Academy (2021–present)

The York Community Stadium (known for sponsorship purposes as the LNER Community Stadium) is a multi-purpose stadium in Huntington, York, England. It is owned by City of York Council, and is home to York City Football Club, York Knights Men's Rugby League Football Club and also the York Valkyrie Women's team. The capacity of the all-seater stadium is 8,500.

The move to a new stadium was necessitated by the terms of the loan York City secured from the Football Stadia Improvement Fund to purchase their Bootham Crescent ground. Planning permission for the current design, put forward by Greenwich Leisure, was granted in March 2015. After several delays, construction began in December 2017 and was completed in December 2020. In addition to the stadium, the site houses a leisure complex and a community hub.

The opening match at the York Community Stadium saw York City take on AFC Fylde on 16 February 2021, which ended in a 3–1 victory for Fylde, with Alex Whitmore scoring the opening goal at the stadium. The stadium hosted both women's semi-finals of the 2021 Rugby League World Cup.

== Background ==
York City F.C. ceased ownership of their Bootham Crescent ground in the summer of 1999, after the club's real property assets were transferred to a holding company called Bootham Crescent Holdings. The club secured a £2 million loan from the Football Stadia Improvement Fund (FSIF) to buy the ground in February 2004. The terms of this loan required the club to identify a site for a new stadium by 2007, and have detailed planning permission by 2009, to avoid financial penalties. Once plans for a new stadium were in place, the loan would turn into a grant to assist in funding the relocation.

As part of the loan agreement, Persimmon had first refusal on purchasing Bootham Crescent once York City left, for 10% lower than its market value. Persimmon intended to build 93 homes on the site, and the proceeds of the sale would go towards building the new stadium. In March 2008, York City's managing director Jason McGill cited "the annual cost of £60,000 for the maintenance and upkeep of a 1932 stadium with few commercial and income-generating opportunities" as the reason for the continued need to move to a new stadium.

== Planning history ==
York City had identified a preferred site for a new stadium by April 2007, but were unable to disclose the location due to confidentiality clauses. Despite the club failing to formally identify a site by the end of 2007, financial penalties were not incurred, as the FSIF were satisfied with the progress made. However, McGill said plans with the preferred site had stalled by March 2008. City of York Council announced its commitment to building a community stadium in May 2008, which would be used by York City and the city's rugby league club, York City Knights.

A project board was established in January 2009, with the objective of ensuring the stadium be built by 2012. City councillors approved the outline business case for the stadium in June 2009, meaning officials could start searching for sites. Four sites were put forward to the council in June 2010, and York City favoured the option of building a 6,000 all-seater stadium at Monks Cross in Huntington, to the north of York, on the site of Huntington Stadium (home of the Knights), which would be ready by 2014 at the earliest. Mark Stead of The Press noted the advantages of this site, including the potential for land value to include, the opportunity to build health and fitness facilities and commercial interest, and the disadvantages, including a scheduled ancient monument being located on adjacent land and traffic concerns. In July 2010, this location was chosen by the council executive as their preferred option.

Developers Oakgate (Monks Cross) Ltd submitted a planning application for a community stadium, for use by York City and York City Knights, and a retail park in September 2011. The council granted planning permission for the development in May 2012, with the stadium expected to be ready during the 2014–15 season. Gavin Aitchison of The Press commented that "one of York's biggest planning controversies in years finally came to a head" after the planning committee meeting that lasted over eight hours. Critics argued the development would damage the city centre economy, with a report by Deloitte saying the development would cost the city centre £50 million a year. In November 2012, construction was delayed until June 2014, for a completion date of July 2015. A delay to the construction of the shopping park in June 2013, caused by the discovery of protected great crested newts at the site, meant the stadium completion date was moved to January 2016.

In August 2014, Greenwich Leisure (GLL) were named as the council's preferred bidder to deliver an 8,000 all-seater stadium, to be shared by York City and York City Knights, and a leisure complex and a community hub. Construction was due to start during spring 2015, for a completion date of July 2016. York City were given responsibility for operating and managing the stadium on an initial 13-year contract. A planning application for the GLL plan was submitted to the council in December 2014, which was passed in March 2015. The cost of the stadium and leisure complex, including a replacement athletics track at another site, stood at £37 million.

In July 2015, construction was delayed as contracts were still being finalised, and the completion date was moved to during the 2016–17 season. Construction was delayed again a month later, with work to begin in February or March 2016, for completion in April or May 2017. With construction costs increasing due to more detailed design work, construction inflation and delays, the council pledged an additional £7.2 million in March 2016, raising the total cost of the project to £44.2 million. Construction was delayed to the summer of 2016, for completion in early 2018.

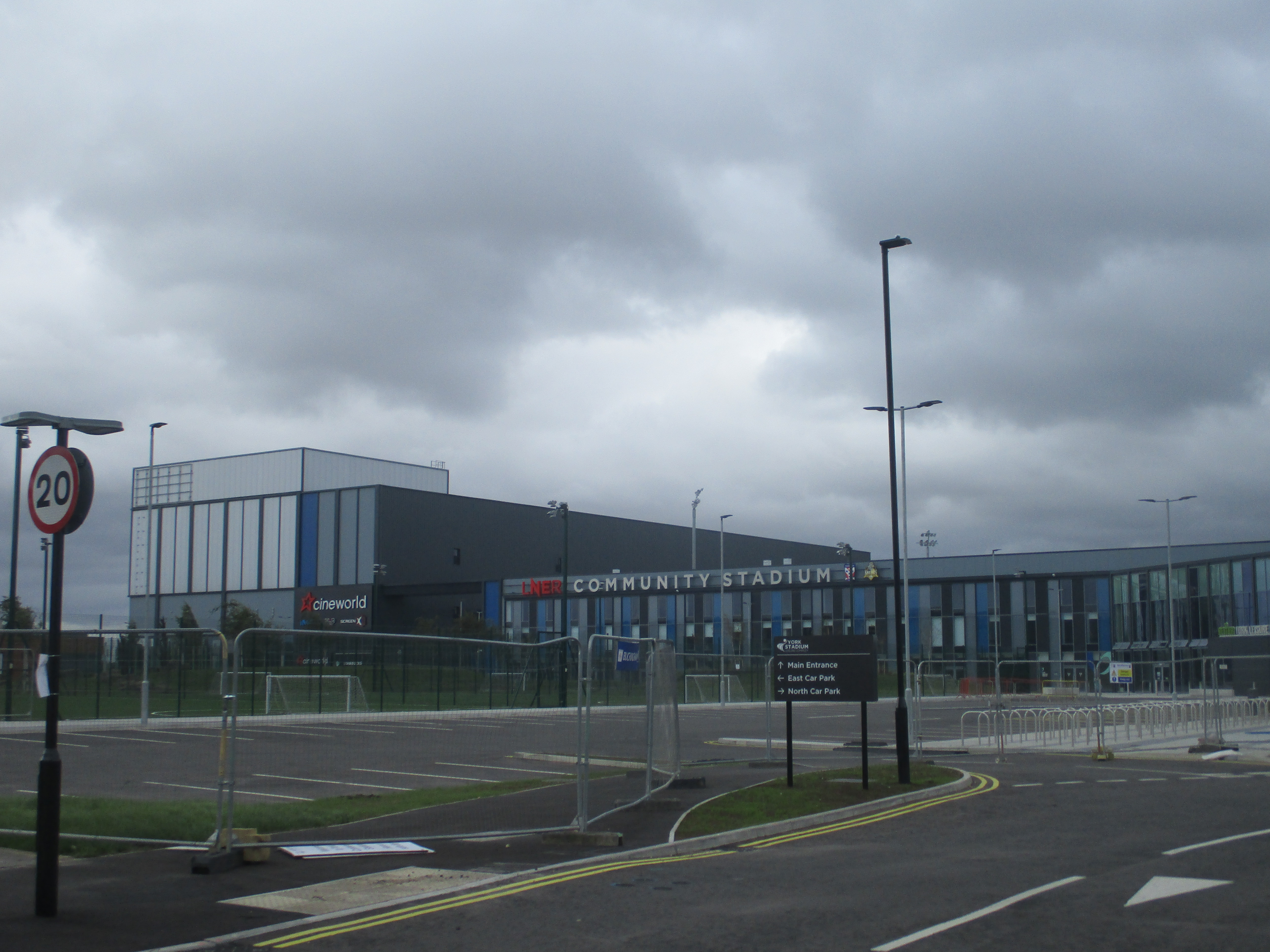
August 2020 exterior view of the stadium, having not yet hosted a game

A judicial review of the development was launched in October 2016 by Vue Cinemas, who objected to an extra screen being approved at the site. Later that year, principal contractor ISG withdrew, citing rising costs and the judicial review, which was settled in the City of York's favour in January 2017. By May that year, construction had not yet begun nor had a new contractor been found. In November, the council stated that work would begin on the stadium before the end of the year, to be opened for the 2019–20 season. Construction began on 4 December 2017. After a number of delays, the stadium was completed and handed to the operators GLL in December 2020.

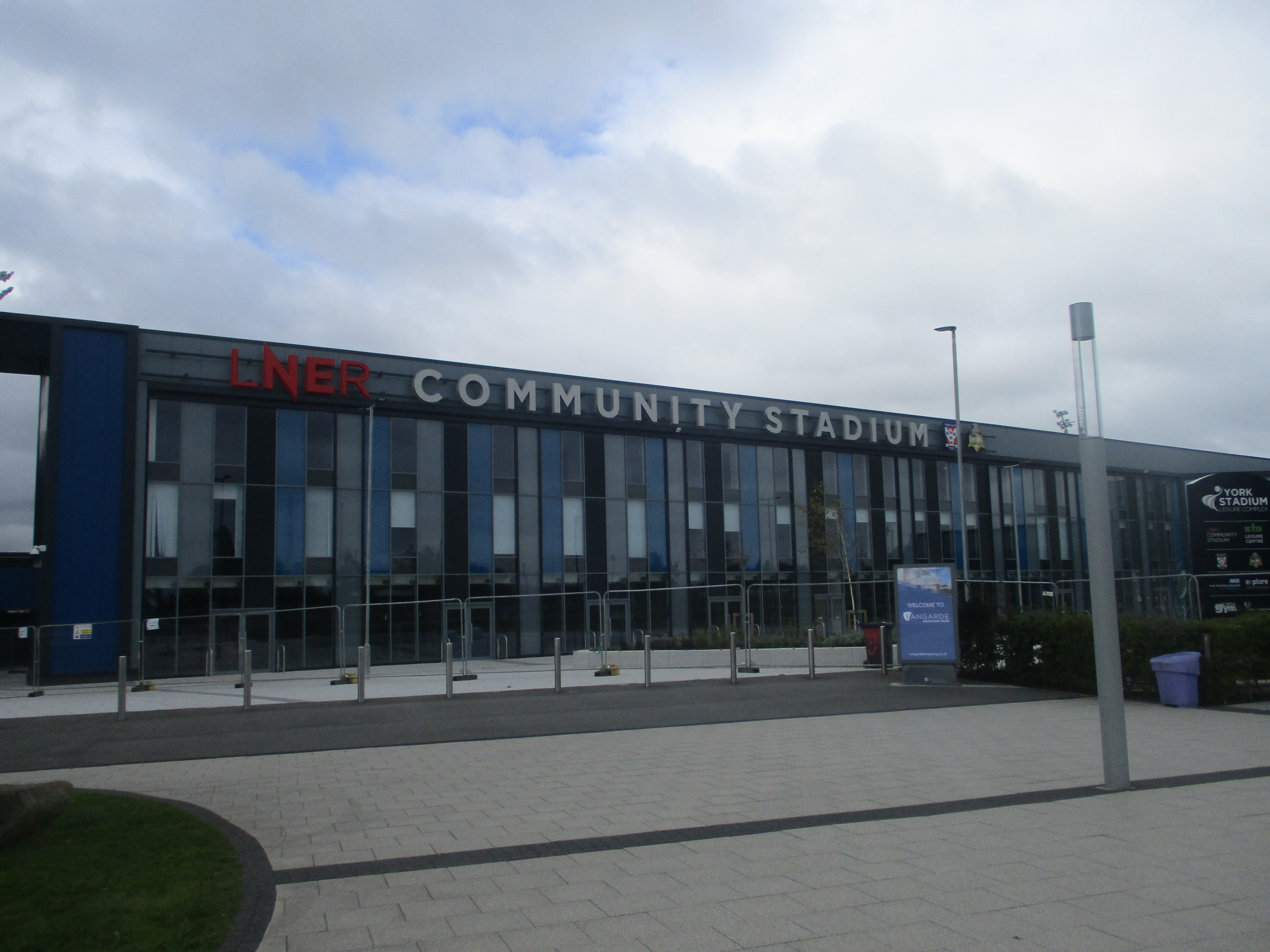
Exterior view

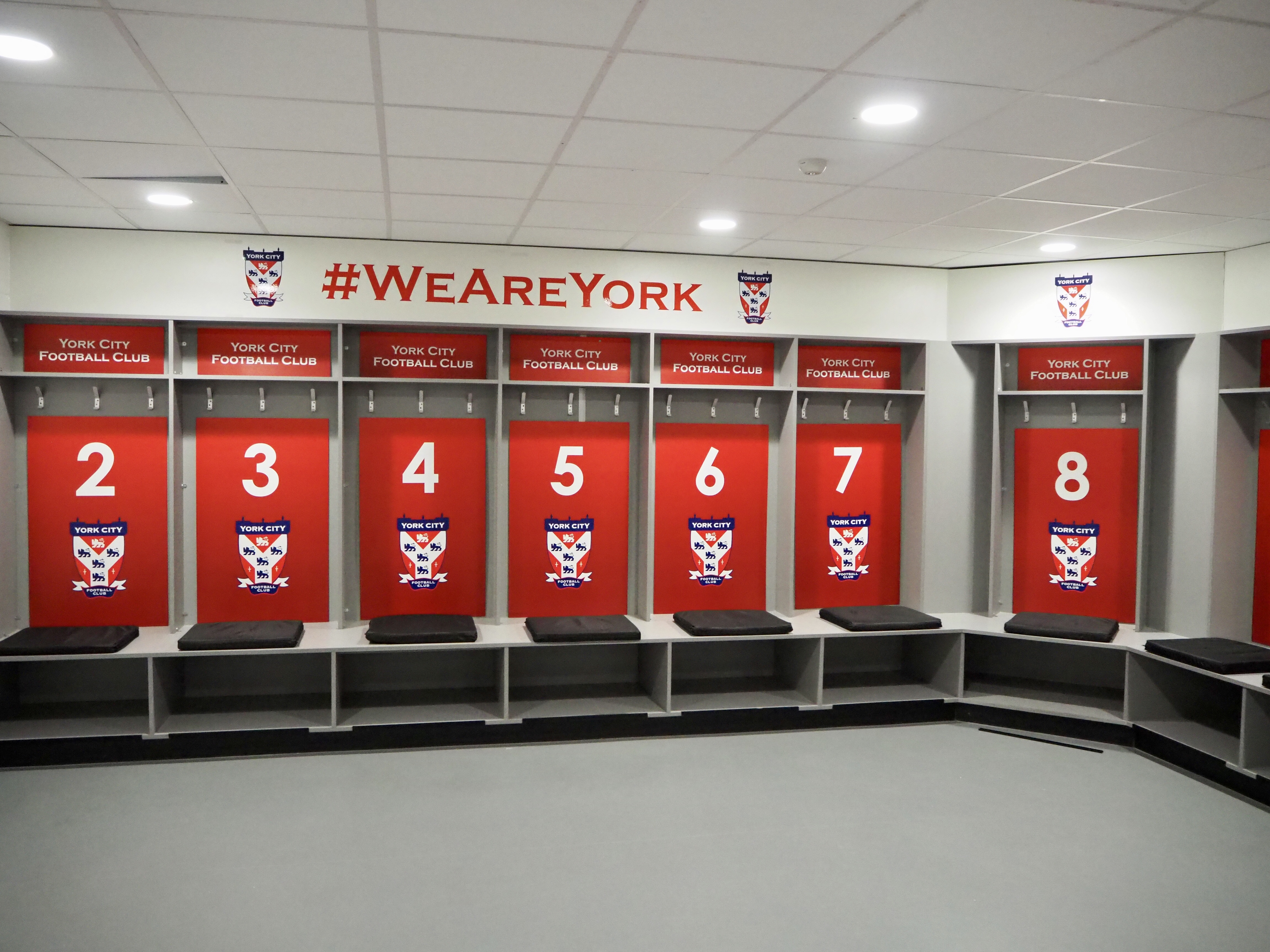
The dressing room for York City

== Structure and facilities ==
The stadium has an all-seated capacity of 8,500. It comprises four stands; the East Stand (Main Stand), the West Stand, the North Stand and the South Stand. The three-floored East Stand accommodates hospitality guests, players, officials and the media, and is connected to the adjacent retail and community facilities. The stands stretch the length of the playing field, and each corner hosts stadium facilities, including matchday emergency services, stewarding, groundsman accommodation, plant space and a fan zone. The seats are coloured red, white, yellow and blue, a combination of the colours of both teams.

The pitch uses reinforced natural grass, with provision to counter frost. The dimensions for football matches are 105 by 68 metres (115 by 74 yd), with 3 metre wide run-offs on the sides and 6.5 metre wide run-offs behind the goals, which meet FIFA recommendations. The dimensions for rugby league matches are 100 by 68 metres (109 by 74 yd), with 6 metre in-goal areas, and 3 metre wide run-offs on the sides and after the dead ball lines.

Adjoining the stadium is the leisure complex, which includes a 25-metre, six-lane swimming pool, a sports hall for netball, badminton and basketball, a gym with dance and spinning studios, an adventure sports zone and three 3G five-a-side pitches. A community hub houses health and well-being services for York residents and visitors, including clinical services, an independent living assessment centre and a library.

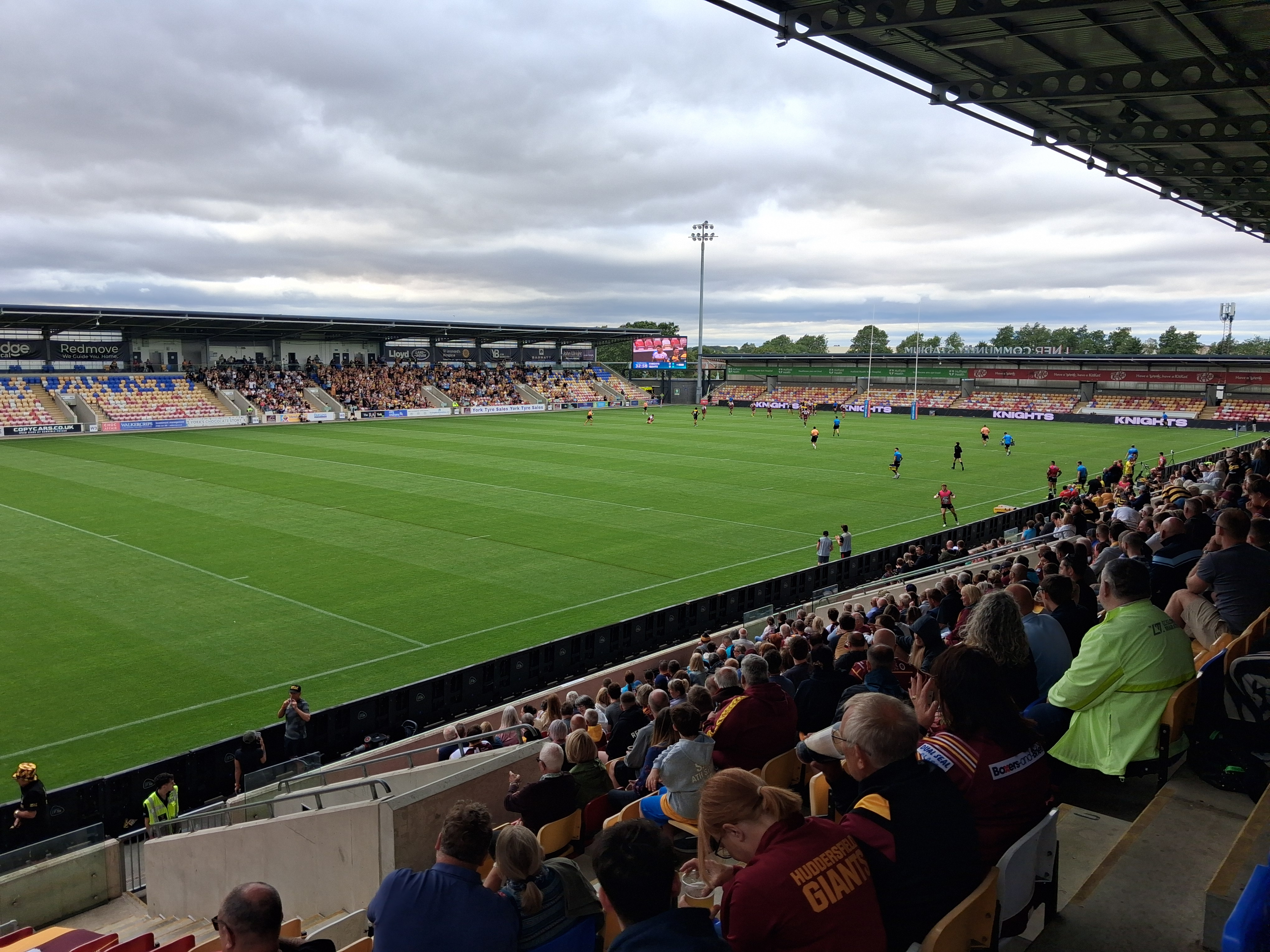
View from the East stand, York Knights v Huddersfield Giants, July 2026

== Mural ==
In 2021, a large mural was painted on the West Stand depicting Clifford's Tower, the York city walls, York Minster, York City F.C. players, York City Knights players, and an "Azuma" train. It was designed by the University of York.

== Transport ==
Regular bus services serve the stadium from the city centre, and additional services to other areas will be considered if there is sufficient demand. A review of the park and ride operating times will take place, with an extension to the service to be sought. On matchdays, 400 car parking places and 355 cycle parking places are available at the stadium. A cycle route exists between the site and the city centre.

== York City league attendances ==
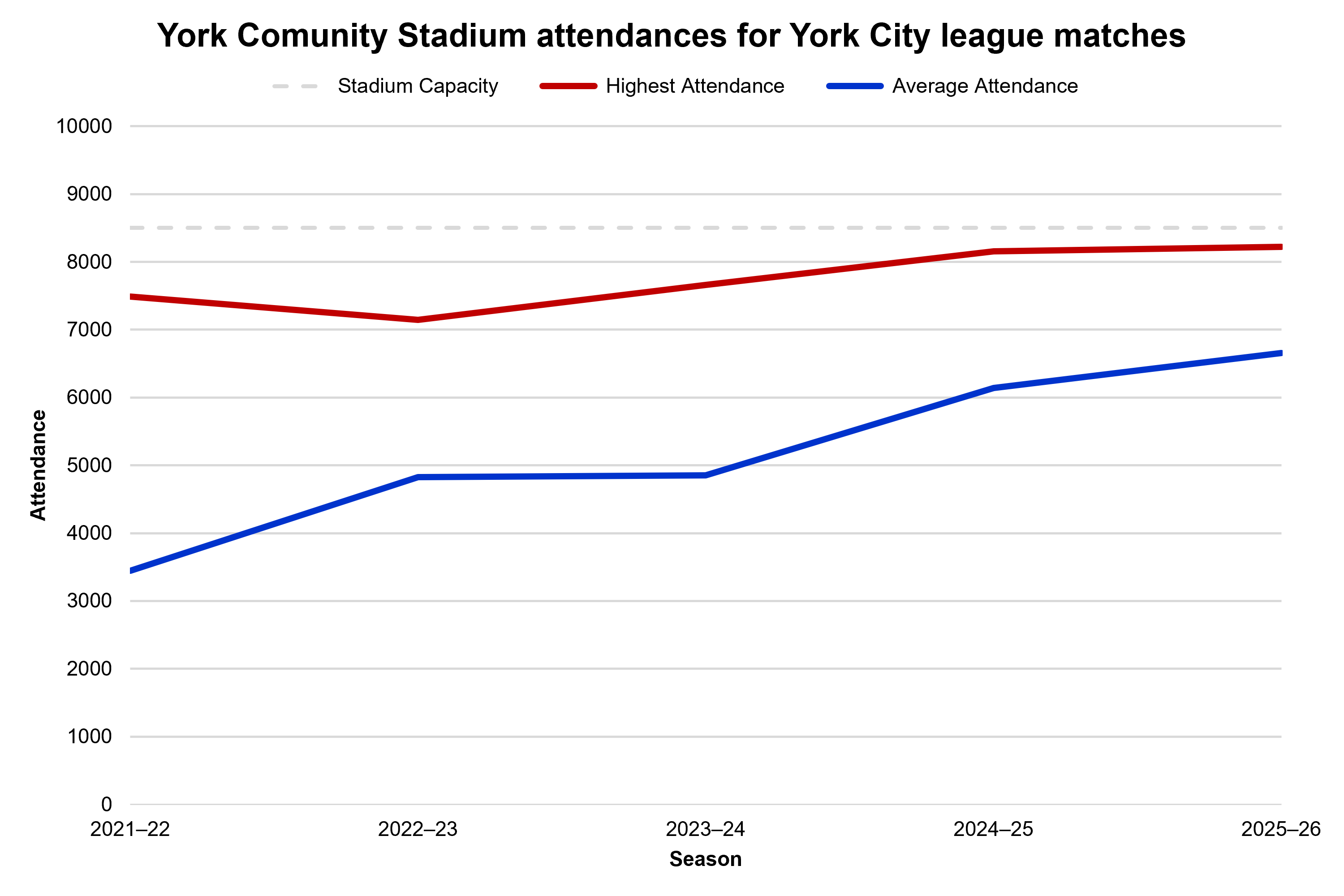
Evolution of York City absolute league attendances

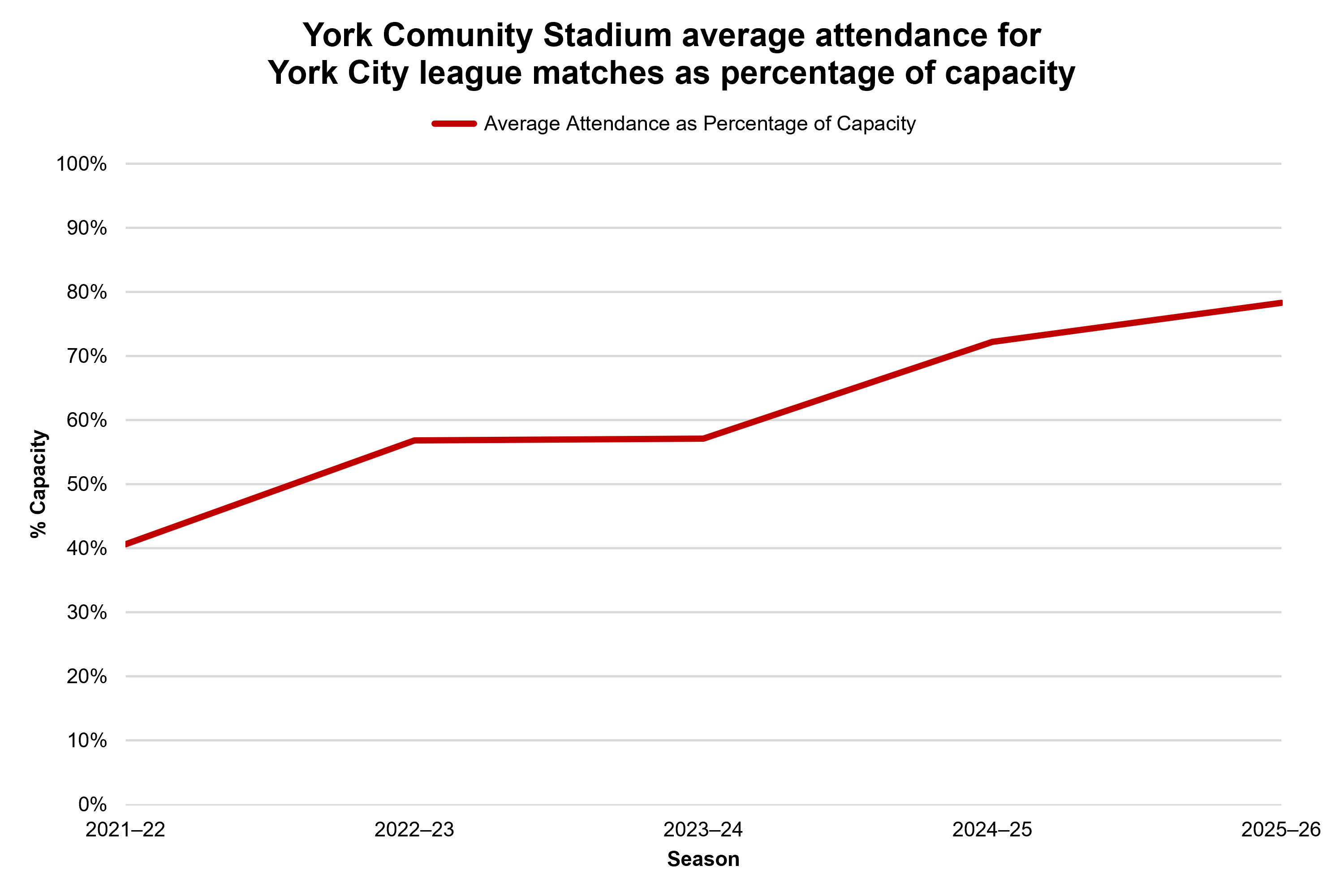
Evolution of York City average league attendances as a percentage of capacity

Season	League	Stadium capacity	Highest attendance	Average attendance	% of capacity
2021–22	National League North	8,500	7,488	3,448	40.6%
2022–23	National League	8,500	7,145	4,827	56.8%
2023–24	National League	8,500	7,657	4,854	57.1%
2024–25	National League	8,500	8,153	6,138	72.2%
2025–26	National League	8,500	8,219	6,657	78.3%

== Other uses ==
=== General ===
Beyond the main tenants, the stadia is regularly used by other teams, including Leeds United, Sheffield United and Hull City for development side and friendly fixtures.

The England rugby union team squad hosted an open training session at the ground on 1 March 2024 and England's women's team beat Italy 38–5 on 23 March 2025, the latter initially set a ground record attendance of 8,391 beating the 8,209 who saw Leeds United play Monaco in a friendly on 22 July 2023. This record was then broken when 8,402 attended a rugby league Challenge Cup semi-final fixture between Hull Kingston Rovers and the Catalans Dragons on 10 May 2025.

=== 2021 Women's Rugby League World Cup ===
York Community Stadium was selected as the venue for the Group B matches and the semi-finals of the 2021 Women's Rugby League World Cup.

Date		Result		Attendance	Refs
2 November 2022	New Zealand	46–0	France	3,091	
2 November 2022	Australia	74–0	Cook Islands	3,091	
6 November 2022	New Zealand	34–4	Cook Islands	3,006	
6 November 2022	Australia	92–0	France	3,006	
10 November 2022	France	18–26	Cook Islands	3,370	
10 November 2022	Australia	10–8	New Zealand	3,370	
14 November 2022	Australia	82–0	Papua New Guinea	7,139	
14 November 2022	England	6–20	New Zealand	7,139	

=== 2025 Women's Rugby World Cup ===
In August 2023, York Community Stadium was confirmed as one of eight host venues for the 2025 Women's Rugby World Cup.

2025 Women's rugby union world cup matches held at York Community Stadium
Date	Country	Score	Country	Attendance	Stage of Tournament	Ref
23 August 2025	Canada	65–7	Fiji	4,810	Pool stage (Pool B)	
24 August 2025	New Zealand	54–8	Spain	7,458	Pool stage (Pool C)	
30 August 2025	United States	31–31	Australia	7,828	Pool stage (Pool A)	
31 August 2025	Italy	24–29	South Africa	6,045	Pool stage (Pool D)	
6 September 2025	United States	60–0	Samoa	7,124	Pool stage (Pool A)	
7 September 2025	Japan	29–21	Spain	3,779	Pool stage (Pool C)	
