= Sidorella Bracic =

Spanish rugby player

- Born: 12 June 1993 (age 33)
- Height: 164 cm (5 ft 5 in)
- Weight: 83 kg (183 lb; 13 st 1 lb)

Rugby union career
- Position: Prop
Senior career
| Years | Team | Apps | (Points) |
| ?–2024 | Olímpico RC | | |
| 2024– | El Salvador | | |
International career
| Years | Team | Apps | (Points) |
| 2021– | Spain | 29 | (0) |

Sidorella Bracic (born 12 June 1993) is a Spanish rugby union player. She competed for Spain in the 2025 Women's Rugby World Cup.

== Early life and career ==
Bracic was born to an Italian father, and a Spanish mother. Her grandparents are of Montenegrin descent. She previously competed in shot put, she placed fifth at the national championships before a serious wrist injury made her switch to rugby.

== Rugby career ==
Bracic made her test debut for Spain against the Netherlands in the 2020 Rugby Europe Women's Championship, which was played in March 2021.

In 2022, she played in the friendly match against Colombia, it was a non-test match. A week later, she got her first start against Netherlands in the opening game of the European Championship.

In 2024, she was part of the Spanish side that won their fourth European Championship. She played for Olímpico RC before joining El Salvador for the 2024–2025 season. She competed at the 2024 WXV 3 tournament where Spain went undefeated and earned a spot at the Rugby World Cup.

Bracic also was in the team that were crowned European champions for an eighth consecutive time, making it their twelfth title. She was named in Spain's squad for the 2025 Women's Rugby World Cup in England.
