= FSIF =

FSIF may stand for:

- Football Stadia Improvement Fund, organisation providing funding to lower-level football clubs in England
- Friendly Society of Iron Founders, former British trade union
