= 2023 Rugby Europe Women's Championship =

Tournament details
- Date: February 11, 2023 - February 25, 2023
- Countries: Netherlands; Spain; Sweden
- Teams: 3

Final positions
- Champions: Spain
- Runner-up: Netherlands

Tournament statistics
- Matches played: 3
- Tries scored: 35 (11.67 per match)
- Attendance: 3,900 (1,300 per match)
- Top scorer(s): (Spain) Claudia Peña Hidalgo (38 points)
- Most tries: (Spain) Alba Vinuesa García (5 tries)
- Website: Rugby Europe

The 2023 Rugby Europe Women's Championship was the 26th edition of Rugby Europe's first division competition for women's national rugby union teams. It was celebrated in February 2023, and the winner will qualify to the first edition of WXV.

Sweden was the new team in the Championship, they were promoted after winning the 2021–22 Rugby Europe Women's Trophy. They replaced Russia, who were suspended.

Spain won their sixth consecutive title after going undefeated throughout the tournament.

== Standings ==
Pos	Team	P	W	D	L	PF	PA	PD	BP	Pts
1	Spain	2	2	0	0	160	5	+155	2	10
2	Netherlands	2	1	0	1	38	82	-44	1	5
3	Sweden	2	0	0	2	17	128	-111	0	0

== Results ==
11 February 2023	(1 BP) Netherlands	38–12	Sweden	National Rugby Center, Amsterdam
16:00 CET (UTC+1)	Try: Anouk Veerkamp (3) 13' c, 19' c, 34' c Noa Johanna Donkersloot 26' m Helen Adriana Maria Van Hattem (2) 36' c, 56' m Con: Helen Adriana Maria Van Hattem (4/6) 14', 20', 35', 37'; Cards: Isa Suzanne Prins (yellow card) 69' to 79'		Try: Matilda Mahlberg 18' m Sara Jacobsson 66' c Con: Frida Nilsson (1/2) 67'	Attendance: 2000; Referee: Adele Robert (BEL)

19 February 2023	(1 BP) Spain	70–0	Netherlands	Poliesportiu de Pins Vens, Sitges
14:00 CET (UTC+1)	Try: Clara Piquero Fernández 1' m Claudia Peña Hidalgo (2) 9' c, 39' m Alba Capell Sandín (2) 14' m, 51' c Alba Vinuesa García 21' c Maider Aresti Félix 25' c Claudia Pérez Pérez (2) 28' m, 47' m Lucia Gayoso Aycart 55' m Maria Miguel Gil 70' m Carmen Castellucci Ocaña 77' c Con: Claudia Peña Hidalgo (4/11) 10', 22', 25', 51'; Alba Alpín Bardaji (1/1) 77'; Cards: Alba Capell Sandín (yellow card) 41' to 51'; Carmen Castellucci Ocaña (yellow card) 60' to 70'		Cards: Liza Maria Sara De Wild (yellow card) 45' to 55'	Attendance: 450; Referee: Melissa Leboeuf (FRA)

25 February 2023	(1 BP) Spain	90–5	Sweden	Campo del Pantano, Villajoyosa
17:00 CET (UTC+1)	Try: Zahía Pérez (2) 4' c, 77' c Maider Aresti Félix (2) 11' m, 16' c Vico Gorrochategui Juste 18' m Alba Vinuesa García (4) 22' c, 37' c, 45' c, 54' c Claudia Pérez Pérez (2) 27' m, 42' m Lucia Gayoso Aycart 56' c Ceci Huarte Sebastián 67' c Alba Alpín Bardaji 71' c Con: Claudia Peña Hidalgo (10/14) 5', 16', 24', 39', 47', 55', 58', 68', 72', 80+2'		Try: Olivia Palmgren 62' m	Attendance: 1450; Referee: Maria Heitor (POR)

== Leading scorers ==
=== Most points ===
Rank	Player	Country	Points
1	Claudia Peña Hidalgo	Spain	38
2	Alba Vinuesa García	Spain	25
3	Claudia Pérez Pérez	Spain	20
4	Helen Adriana Maria Van Hattem	Netherlands	18

=== Most tries ===
Rank	Player	Country	Tries
1	Alba Vinuesa García	Spain	5
2	Claudia Pérez Pérez	Spain	4
3	Anouk Veerkamp	Netherlands	3
3	Maider Aresti Félix	Spain	3
