= Anna Puig =

- Born: 14 October 1999 (age 27) Barcelona
- Height: 174 cm (5 ft 9 in)
- Weight: 82 kg (181 lb; 12 st 13 lb)

Rugby union career
- Position: Lock
Senior career
| Years | Team | Apps | (Points) |
| 2016– | UE Santboiana | | |
International career
| Years | Team | Apps | (Points) |
| 2018– | Spain | 38 | (50) |
National sevens team
| Years | Team | | Comps |
| 2017– | Spain 7s | | |

Anna Puig Delgado (born 14 October 1999) is a Spanish rugby union player. She competed for Spain in the 2025 Women's Rugby World Cup.

== Early career ==
Puig started playing rugby at the age of five, as she used to accompany her brother to training sessions. She made her senior debut during the 2016–17 season in the División de Honor Catalana (Catalonia's top regional division). She achieved the long-awaited promotion to the División de Honor B Femenina de Rugby in the 2023–24 season.

== Rugby career ==
Puig made her international debut for Spain against Germany on 27 February at the 2018 Rugby Europe Women's Championship in Waterloo, Belgium. She also plays for UE Santboiana in Spain.

At the 2019 European Championship, she scored a try in her side's 54–0 victory over Netherlands in the final. Two weeks later, she underwent surgery on her left shoulder due to a grade III acromioclavicular dislocation.

She was part of the team that won the 2025 Europe Championship, Spain's twelfth European title. She was selected in Spain's squad for the 2025 Women's Rugby World Cup in England.
