= Mónica Castelo =

- Born: 18 April 1987 (age 39) Oleiros, Spain
- Height: 175 cm (5 ft 9 in)
- Weight: 83 kg (183 lb; 13 st 1 lb)

Rugby union career
- Position: Lock
Senior career
Years	Team	Apps	(Points)
?–2021	CR Arquitectura Técnica		(0)
2021–2025	Stade Rennais		(0)
International career
Years	Team	Apps	(Points)
2012–2025	Spain	31	(20)

Mónica Castelo (born 18 April 1987) is a former Spanish rugby union player. She has competed for Spain in the 2017 and 2025 Women's Rugby World Cups.

== Early life and career ==
Castelo was born in Oleiros and has been participating in sports from a very young age. Before she dedicated herself to rugby, she took part in swimming, and rowing, in which she was part of the women's crew that were runners-up in the Spanish batel category. She later joined CR Arquitectura Técnica, where she began to stand out in the top tier of Spanish women's rugby and caught the attention of national team coaches.

== Rugby career ==
Castelo made her international debut for Spain against France in 2012, and quickly established herself as a key player in the Second row. She has participated in numerous international matches and contributed to Spain's European titles, including the 2020 title in which her side trounced the Netherlands, and the 2022 title, when Spain were crowned continental champions again.

Throughout her career at CR Arquitectura Técnica, she distinguished herself with her physical strength and scoring ability, scoring decisive tries in the Spanish league. Her performance opened the doors to professional rugby in France, where she signed with Stade Rennais in the Élite 1 competition. Drawing on her experience in Brittany, she has highlighted in interviews the differences between Spanish and French women's rugby, emphasizing the greater professionalism, technical resources, and support for athletic development she found in France.

Although she announced her retirement from the Spanish national team in 2022, she was recalled two years later to the side to face Wales in a key qualifying match for the 2025 World Cup and the fight for promotion in the WXV competition, demonstrating her continued relevance at the elite level of rugby.

Castelo was selected in Spain's squad for the 2025 Women's Rugby World Cup in England, she was the oldest player on the team. After Spain's elimination in the group stage during the tournament, she announced her retirement from international rugby.

== Personal life ==
Castelo holds a degree in education from the University of A Coruña. During her time in France, she combined rugby with her work as an education assistant in a school, a role she describes as a liaison between teachers and students. In addition to her professional career, she has been an active voice in promoting women's rugby, emphasizing the need to move towards greater professionalization of the sport in Spain.
