= Alba Vinuesa =

- Born: 30 March 1999 (age 27)
- Height: 171 cm (5 ft 7 in)
- Weight: 74 kg (163 lb; 11 st 9 lb)

Rugby union career
- Position: Centre
Senior career
Years	Team	Apps	(Points)
2023–	Stade Français		
International career
Years	Team	Apps	(Points)
2018–	Spain	36	(65)
National sevens team
Years	Team		Comps
2018–	Spain 7s		11

Alba Vinuesa (born 30 March 1999) is a Spanish rugby union player. She competed for Spain in the 2025 Women's Rugby World Cup.

== Rugby career ==
Vinuesa switched from basketball to rugby, and started her rugby career at Rugby Cisneros in Madrid.

She made her international debut for Spain in 2018 and was part of the side that won the European Championship that year. In 2019, she underwent a left hip arthroscopy.

Vinuesa also featured in the side that won the 2020 Rugby Europe Women's Championship.

After graduating from university, she moved to France and joined Stade Français in 2023. She scored four tries against Sweden and helped Spain win their 10th European Championship title. She also featured for Spain at the 2024 European Championship.

Vinuesa was named in Spain's squad for the 2025 Women's Rugby World Cup in England.
