= Cristina Blanco =

Spain international rugby union player

- Born: 30 September 1995 (age 31)
- Height: 170 cm (5 ft 7 in)
- Weight: 80 kg (176 lb; 12 st 8 lb)

Rugby union career
- Position: Hooker
Senior career
Years	Team	Apps	(Points)
2021–2023	Wasps		
2023–	Trailfinders		
International career
Years	Team	Apps	(Points)
2019–	Spain	34	(55)

Cristina Blanco Herrera (born 30 September 1995) is a Spanish rugby union player. She represents Spain internationally, and plays for Trailfinders in the Premiership Women's Rugby competition. She competed for Spain in the 2025 Women's Rugby World Cup.

== Early career ==
Blanco only started playing rugby in university when a friend asked her if she wanted to try the sport out, which led to her playing for the University sevens team for a few years before joining Olímpico RC, her first rugby club. She was still playing basketball at the time.

== Rugby career ==
During her time at Olímpico RC, she started out as a Loose forward before she transitioned to a Hooker. She made her test debut for Spain when they played against South Africa in her sides 2019 tour.

Blanco was part of the team that attempted to qualify for the 2021 Rugby World Cup in New Zealand, but were unsuccessful. She signed with the Wasps in 2021.

She was named as Spain's captain and led them at the inaugural 2023 WXV 3 tournament in Dubai. She then joined Trailfinders ahead of the 2023–24 Premiership Women's Rugby season, she won the Players’ Player of the Year award at the end of the season.

She competed in the 2024 WXV 3 tournament where Spain were crowned WXV 3 champions and had also earned a spot in the 2025 Rugby World Cup.

Blanco re-signed with the Trailfinders in 2025. She was part of the victorious Spanish side that won their twelfth European championship. She was eventually selected in Spain's squad for the 2025 Women's Rugby World Cup in England.
