= Sora Nishimura =

Japan international rugby union player

- Born: 29 September 2000 (age 26)
- Height: 167 cm (5 ft 6 in)
- Weight: 68 kg (150 lb; 10 st 10 lb)

Rugby union career
- Position: Fullback
Senior career
Years	Team	Apps	(Points)
2023–	Mie Pearls		
International career
Years	Team	Apps	(Points)
2023–	Japan	24	(28)

Sora Nishimura (born 29 September 2000) is a Japanese rugby union player. She represented Japan at the 2025 Women's Rugby World Cup.

== Early life and career ==
Nishimura graduated from Otemon Gakuin High School in 2019 and enrolled at Rissho University. In 2022, she was named co-captain of Rissho University's rugby club.

== Rugby career ==
Nishimura graduated from Rissho University in 2023 and joined Mie Pearls. On May 28, she started in her international debut for Japan against Kazakhstan in the final of the 2023 Asia Rugby Women's Championship in Almaty. She scored a try in her team's 72–0 thrashing of Kazakhstan.

She started in nine matches for Japan at fullback in 2024.

On 28 July 2025, she was named in the Japanese side to the Women's Rugby World Cup in England. During their match against the Black Ferns, Nishimura collided with teammate, Ayasa Otsuka, when they both attempted to field the kick-off. She injured her leg in the process and was replaced in the opening minute of the game.
