= Zahía Pérez =

Spanish rugby union player

- Born: 14 January 2004 (age 22)
- Height: 172 cm (5 ft 8 in)
- Weight: 71 kg (157 lb; 11 st 3 lb)

Rugby union career
- Position(s): Centre, Fly-half
Senior career
Years	Team	Apps	(Points)
2021–2026	CR Cisneros		
2026–	AC Bobigny 93		
International career
Years	Team	Apps	(Points)
2022–	Spain	33	(67)
National sevens team
Years	Team		Comps
2021–	Spain 7s		

Zahía Pérez (born 14 January 2004) is a Spanish rugby union player. She competed for Spain in the 2025 Women's Rugby World Cup.

== Rugby career ==
Pérez made her international debut for Spain against the Netherlands in the 2022 Europe Women's Championship. She had played in the non-test match against Colombia a few days earlier.

In 2023, she was stretchered off the field in the test against the United States after sustaining an injury after an awkward collision with a teammate.

She was part of the Spanish side that competed at the 2024 Rugby Europe Women's Championship. She scored the final try in Spain's 19–36 loss to South Africa in Cape Town in September that year.

She was selected in Spain's squad for the 2025 Women's Rugby World Cup in England. She started in all three of Spain's matches in the tournament.
