= Alba Capell =

- Born: 28 October 2003 (age 23)
- Height: 164 cm (5 ft 5 in)

Rugby union career
- Position: Back row
Senior career
| Years | Team | Apps | (Points) |
| 2019–2023 | FC Barcelona | 14 | (20) |
| 2023–2024 | Stade Rennais | | |
| 2024– | Sale Sharks | | |
International career
| Years | Team | Apps | (Points) |
| 2022– | Spain | 31 | (25) |
National sevens team
| Years | Team | | Comps |
| 2023– | Spain 7s | | |

Alba Capell (born 28 October 2003) is a Spanish rugby union and sevens player. She competed for Spain in the 2025 Women's Rugby World Cup.

== Rugby career ==
Capell began her rugby career playing for FC Barcelona's under-10 team. She joined their senior women's team as soon as it was created. The club, which notably included Clàudia Peña, achieved successive promotions, ultimately leading them to the Spanish first division at the end of the 2022–2023 season.

She became a Spanish international in the summer of 2022, she made her test debut against South Africa. The following May, she was selected for the Spanish sevens team and played in the Toulouse tournament of the World Rugby Sevens Series.

She joined Stade Rennais in the Élite 1 competition for their 2023–2024 season. She was selected for the inaugural edition of the WXV tournament.

Capell travelled to England after she was recruited by Sale Sharks for the 2024–2025 season. She was again selected for the WXV tournament, which saw Spain qualify for the 2025 World Cup. She had her moment of fame when she held up the trophy which broke in her hands.

She was eventually selected in Spain's squad for the 2025 Women's Rugby World Cup in England.
