= Ayano Sakurai =

Japan international rugby union player

- Born: 15 April 1996 (age 30)
- Height: 167 cm (5 ft 6 in)
- Weight: 73 kg (161 lb; 11 st 7 lb)

Rugby union career
- Position: Lock
Senior career
Years	Team	Apps	(Points)
- Yokogawa Musashino Artemi-Stars
International career
Years	Team	Apps	(Points)
2015–	Japan	26	(20)
National sevens team
Years	Team		Comps
- Japan 7s

Ayano Sakurai (born 15 April 1996) is a Japanese rugby union player. She competed for Japan at the 2017 and 2025 Women's Rugby World Cups.

== Early life and career ==
Sakurai was born in Annaka, Gunma and began playing rugby at the age of three. After graduating from Takasaki Girls' High School in 2015, she entered Nippon Sport Science University. Her mother is a former referee and both of her parents played rugby.

== Rugby career ==
Sakurai has previously represented Japan women's national sevens team. She made her international fifteens debut for Japan against Hong Kong in 2015.

In December 2016, she featured for the Sakura fifteens in their clash against Fiji during their Asia/Oceania regional qualification tournament for the 2017 Women’s Rugby World Cup.

In 2017, she was selected in Japan's squad to the Women's Rugby World Cup in Ireland. She scored twice against Hong Kong during their eleventh place playoff, Japan were victorious in what was their biggest ever World Cup win.

After graduating from Nippon Sport Science University in 2019, she joined Yokogawa Musashino Artemi-Stars. In 2021, she sustained a serious injury in a match against Scotland, which saw her miss out on playing in the delayed 2021 Rugby World Cup.

On 28 July 2025, she was named in the Japanese side to the Women's Rugby World Cup in England.
