= Amàlia Argudo =

- Born: 24 January 2000 (age 26)
- Height: 169 cm (5 ft 7 in)

Rugby union career
- Position: Fly-half
Senior career
Years	Team	Apps	(Points)
2018–	Stade Toulousain		
International career
Years	Team	Apps	(Points)
2020–	Spain	28	(155)
National sevens team
Years	Team		Comps
2021–	Spain 7s		42 (-)

Amàlia Argudo (born 24 January 2000) is a Spanish rugby union and sevens player. She competed for Spain in the 2025 Women's Rugby World Cup.

== Early life and career ==
Argudo grew up in a family of rugby players. She began playing rugby at CR Sant Cugat, where she was a teammate of Joel Merkler, she was also team captain.

She injured her shoulder while skiing, her injury did not heal and required surgery, she was plagued by complications and relapses. She underwent five operations within seven years.

Outside of rugby, she is a Personal trainer.

== Rugby career ==
In 2016, she joined Stade Toulousain, with whom she won the French Cadet Championship. In May 2017, she was selected by the French Federation for a national under-18 training camp. She considered playing for France for a while, but her injury problems coupled with administrative hassles made her give up.

In January 2020, Argudo made her international fifteens debut for Spain against Scotland. In October 2024, Spain won the WXV 3 tournament, which was also a qualifier for the 2025 World Cup.

In April 2025, she was part of the Spanish squad that were crowned European champions for a fifth time after winning the Rugby Europe Women's Championship. Argudo and her Stade Toulousain side, were defeated in the 2025 Élite 1 final by Stade Bordelais. In August that year, she was named in Spain's squad for the 2025 Women's Rugby World Cup in England.
