= Eider García =

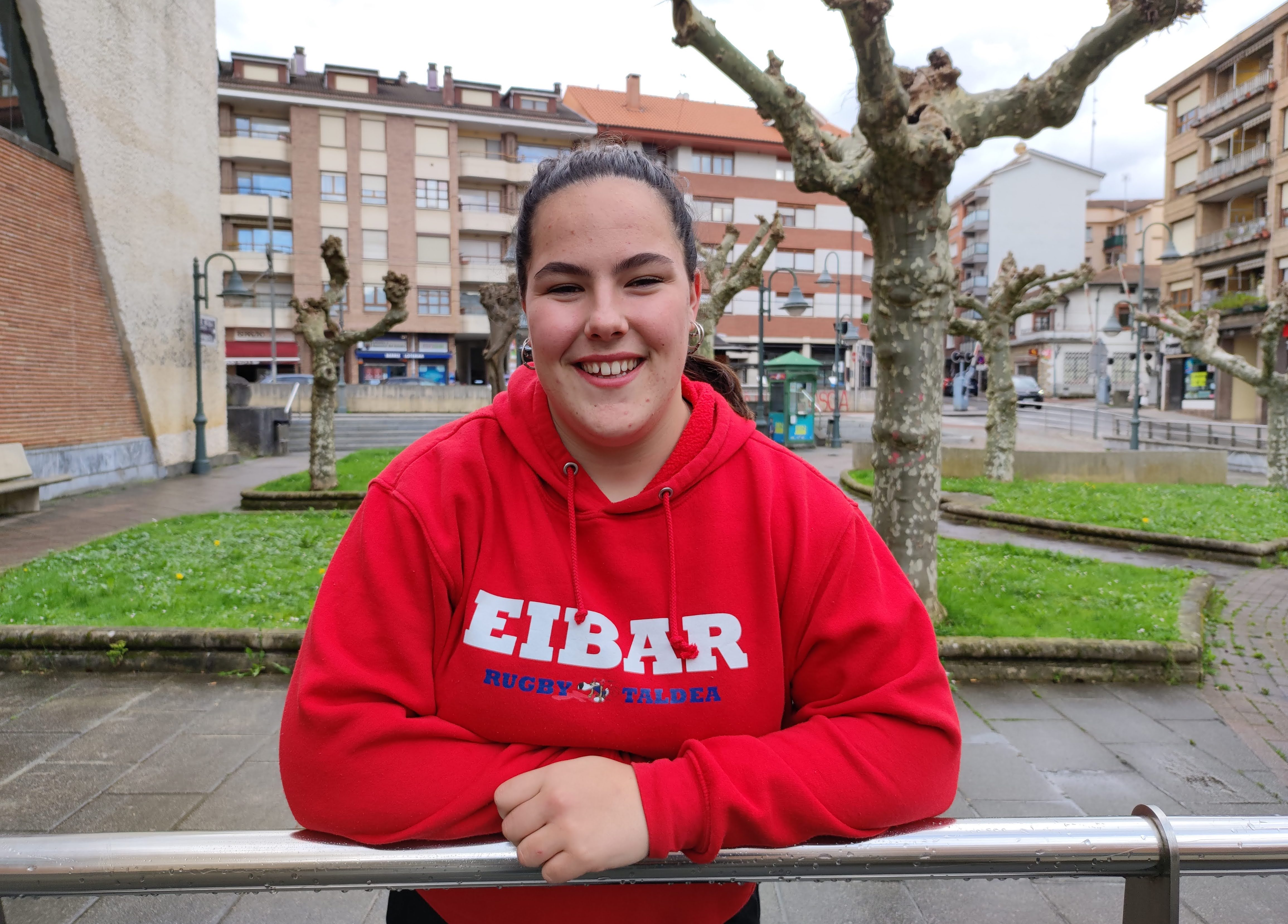
- Born: 3 February 2005 (age 21) Berriz, Spain
- Height: 185 cm (6 ft 1 in)
- Weight: 135 kg (298 lb; 21 st 4 lb)

Rugby union career
- Position: Prop
Senior career
Years	Team	Apps	(Points)
2020–2022	Eibar RT		
2022–	Lyon OU		
International career
Years	Team	Apps	(Points)
2025–	Spain	8	(5)

Eider García (born 3 February 2005) is a Spanish rugby union player. She competed for Spain in the 2025 Women's Rugby World Cup.

== Early career ==
García was born in Berriz, Spain, she started playing rugby union at the age of six. Even as a child, she was tall and strong. She also played basketball but found it more difficult to fully express herself in that sport. In rugby, she was taught to use her unusual physique, which for the first time became an advantage.

== Rugby career ==
At sixteen, García joined Eibar RT who were newly promoted to the Spanish first division. As a minor, federal regulations prohibited her from playing Prop, so she was placed in the Second row.

In early 2022, at the age of 17, García participated in her first national team training camp. Her senior teammates were amazed by her physique. She gained her first international experience with the Spanish A team, against Colombia in February. At the end of the season, while she was taking her baccalaureate exams, she was contacted by the French club Lyon OU, which she joined without hesitation, eager to develop her full sporting potential and perhaps become a professional.

In March 2025, García made her international debut for Spain against Brazil. The following week, at the European Championship, she got her first start against Portugal. She also scored her first international try against Sweden. In August, she was named in Spain's squad for the 2025 Women's Rugby World Cup in England.
