= Masami Kawamura =

Japan international rugby union player

- Born: 13 July 1999 (age 27) Hiroshima Prefecture, Japan
- Height: 173 cm (5 ft 8 in)
- Weight: 75 kg (165 lb; 11 st 11 lb)

Rugby union career
- Position: Back row
Senior career
Years	Team	Apps	(Points)
	Yokogawa Musashino Artemi-Stars		(0)
International career
Years	Team	Apps	(Points)
2022–	Japan	25	(15)

Masami Kawamura (川村雅未) (born 13 July 1999) is a Japanese rugby union player. She plays in the Back row for the Japan women's national rugby union team at an international level. She competed at the delayed 2021 Rugby World Cup in New Zealand.

== Early life ==
In 2018, she graduated from Iwami Chisuikan High School and entered Ryukoku University. She graduated from Ryutsu Keizai University in 2022.

== Rugby career ==
Kawamura made her international debut for Japan on 24 July 2022, she was a substitute in the Taiyo Life Japan Rugby Challenge Series match against South Africa. In September that year, she was subsequently selected for the Japanese side for the delayed 2021 Rugby World Cup that was held in New Zealand.

She scored a try in her sides 72–0 trouncing of Kazakhstan in the 2023 Asia Rugby Women's Championship in Almaty.

In 2024, she featured in the 17 all draw against the United States in Kitakyushu, she scored the final try for her side.

On 28 July 2025, she was named in the Japanese side to the Women's Rugby World Cup in England.
