= Paula Medín =

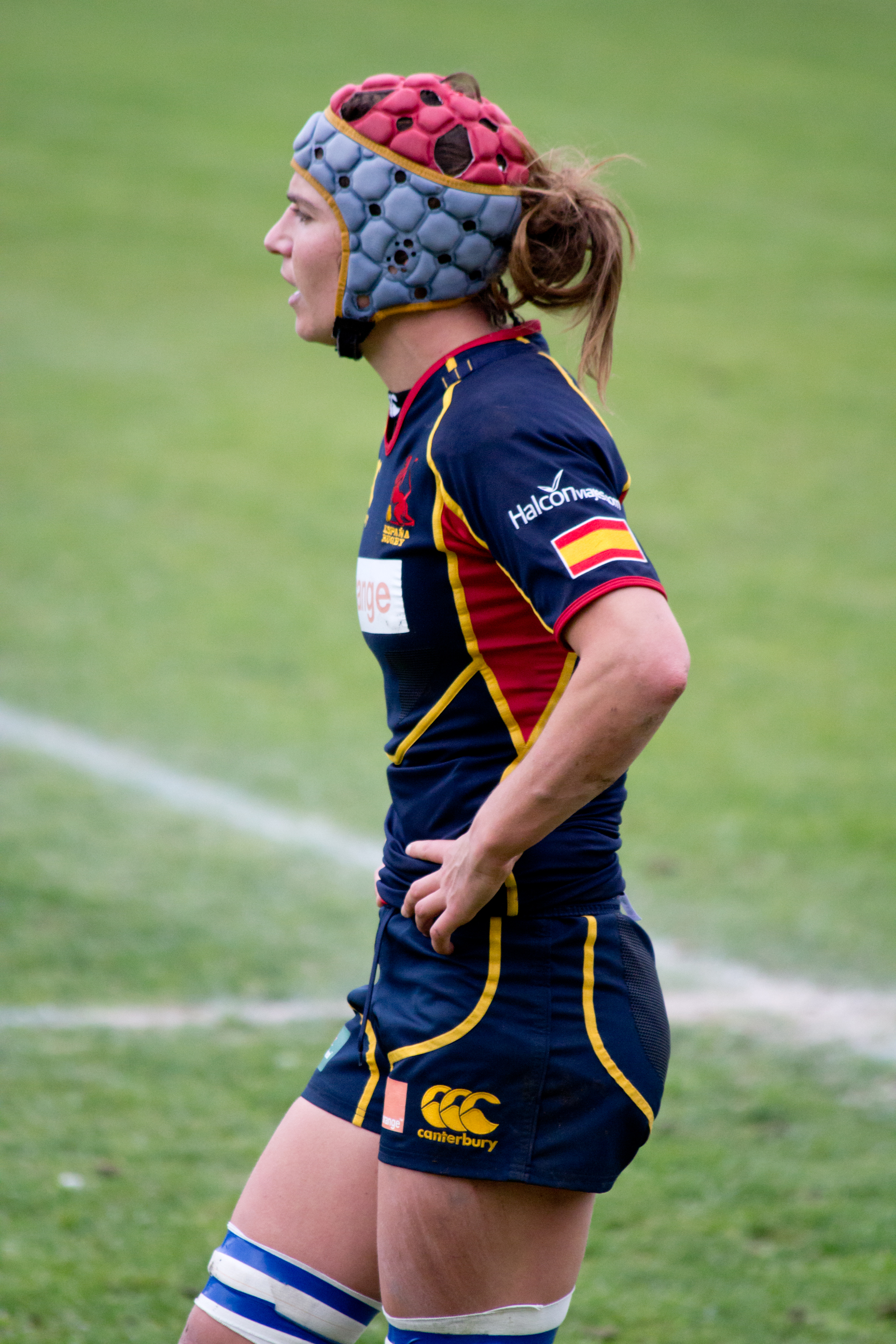
- Medín in 2013
- Full name: Paula Medín López
- Born: June 17, 1984 (age 42) Galicia, Spain
- Height: 1.71 m (5 ft 7 1/2 in)
- Weight: 66 kg (146 lb; 10 st 6 lb)

Rugby union career
- Position: Flanker
Senior career
Years	Team	Apps	(Points)
2015-Now	CR Arquitectura Técnica		
International career
Years	Team	Apps	(Points)
	Spain	44	
National sevens team
Years	Team		Comps
	Spain		131

Paula Medín (born June 17, 1984) is a Spanish rugby sevens player. She was named in Spain's women's sevens team for the 2016 Summer Olympics. She was part of the team that won the final olympic spot for Rio.

She was also at the 2013 Rugby World Cup Sevens.
