= Clara Piquero =

Spanish rugby union player

- Born: 11 February 1999 (age 27)
- Height: 168 cm (5 ft 6 in)
- Weight: 57 kg (126 lb; 9 st 0 lb)

Rugby union career
- Position: Wing
Senior career
Years	Team	Apps	(Points)
- Section Paloise
International career
Years	Team	Apps	(Points)
2022–	Spain	31	(70)
National sevens team
Years	Team		Comps
2017–	Spain 7s		5

Clara Piquero (born 11 February 1999) is a Spanish rugby union player. She competed for Spain in the 2025 Women's Rugby World Cup.

== Early career ==
Piquero used to play baseball before she switched to rugby, which she started playing in 2014.

== Rugby career ==
Piquero made her international debut for Spain in the opening match of the 2022 European Championship against the Netherlands, she scored twice in their 69–0 victory. She also featured in the win over Russia as her side claimed their ninth championship title. During the game she cracked her left fibula after colliding with a Russian player. She recovered in time to join the national sevens team in Bucharest, Romania for the 2022 World Cup Sevens European qualifier, they eventually earned a spot in the tournament in Cape Town, South Africa.

She plays for French club, Section Paloise. She participated in the 2024 Rugby Europe Women's Championship, she scored four tries in their 53–0 victory against Sweden and helped Spain win their seventh consecutive title.

Piquero was named in Spain's squad for the 2025 Women's Rugby World Cup in England.

== Personal life ==
Piquero is dating Spanish rugby player, Kerman Aurrekoetxea, who plays Scrum-half for Biarritz Olympique. She is studying social education at the University of the Basque Country and hopes to work with people with disabilities in the future.
