= Lia Piñeiro =

Spanish rugby player

- Born: 28 August 2001 (age 25) Málaga, Spain
- Height: 167 cm (5 ft 6 in)

Rugby union career
- Position: Back row
Senior career
Years	Team	Apps	(Points)
2019–2025	Olímpico RC		
2025–	Stade Villeneuvois LM		
International career
Years	Team	Apps	(Points)
2024–	Spain	13	(5)

Lia Piñeiro (born 28 August 2001) is a Spanish rugby union player. She competed for Spain in the 2025 Women's Rugby World Cup.

== Early life and career ==
Piñeiro grew up in Manilva, Spain and played golf throughout her childhood because her family lived next to a golf course. At sixteen, she took up mixed martial arts. At 18, she went to study mechanical engineering in Madrid, there she discovered rugby union and joined Olímpico RC.

== Rugby career ==
Piñeiro's first season with Olímpico RC was cut short due to the COVID-19 pandemic. She made her official debut in the first division during the 2020–2021 season.

In March 2024, she made her international debut for Spain against South Africa in Valladolid. She also competed in the 2024 WXV 3 which saw the Spanish side qualify for the 2025 Rugby World Cup.

Piñeiro was selected in Spain's squad for the 2025 Women's Rugby World Cup in England.
