= 2018 Rugby Europe Women's Championship =

2018 Women's European Championship
Tournament details
- Host: Belgium

Final positions
- Champions: Spain
- Runner-up: Netherlands

Tournament statistics
- Matches played: 4

The 2018 Rugby Europe Women's Championship was the 22nd edition of Rugby Europe's top division competition for women's national rugby union teams, and the tenth such tournament for which the European Championship title was awarded. The tournament was held in Belgium from 27 February to 3 March 2018 as a knockout competition, with matches played at Brussels and Waterloo. Spain won the championship to take its third European title and second in a row.

== Format ==
The four teams, based on the world rankings at the time of issuing the tournament regulations, were assigned a seeding from 1 to 4, the highest being that of Spain and, subsequently, the Netherlands, Belgium and Germany. The format was a four team semifinal bracket, with the teams seeded 1 and 2 meeting the teams seeded 4 and 3 respectively. A final for the title was played between the two winners and a match for third place was played by the defeated semifinal teams. All competitions took place at the Stade du Pachy in Waterloo except for the final held at the Petit Heysel in Brussels.

== Results ==
Semifinals
Spain	44
Germany	0
Belgium	12
Netherlands	84

Finals
Spain	40
Netherlands	7
Third place
Belgium	5
Germany	24

=== Semi-finals ===
2018-02-27

Spain	44–0	Germany

Waterloo, Belgium

2018-02-27

Belgium	12–84	Netherlands

Waterloo, Belgium

=== 3rd Place ===
2018-03-02

Belgium	5–24	Germany

Waterloo, Belgium

=== Final ===
2018-03-03

Spain	40–7	Netherlands

Waterloo, Belgium

== See also ==
- 2018–19 Rugby Europe Women's Trophy
- Rugby Europe Women's Championship
- Women's international rugby union § 2018
