= Claudia Pérez =

Spanish rugby union player

- Born: Claudia Pérez Pérez; 29 June 2004 (age 22)
- Height: 162 cm (5 ft 4 in)
- Weight: 63 kg (139 lb; 9 st 13 lb)

Rugby union career
- Position(s): Centre, Wing
Senior career
Years	Team	Apps	(Points)
- Majadahonda
International career
Years	Team	Apps	(Points)
2023–	Spain	21	(35)
National sevens team
Years	Team		Comps
2022–	Spain 7s		

Claudia Pérez Pérez (born 29 June 2004) is a Spanish rugby union player. She competed for Spain in the 2025 Women's Rugby World Cup.

== Personal life ==
Pérez started playing rugby when she was 12. Her mother, Luisa Pérez, is a former Spanish international player.

== Rugby career ==
Pérez competed for Spain's under-18 women's sevens team in the European under-18 sevens championship in 2022, she won a silver medal at the tournament.

In 2023, she made her test debut for Spain in the European Championship. She scored twice in Spain's 70–0 victory over the Netherlands, it was their sixth consecutive European championship title. Later in October, she featured for the Spanish side at the inaugural WXV 3 tournament in Dubai and scored against Kenya in the opening game.

In 2024, she played in Spain's WXV play-off against Wales, it was to determine who got promoted to WXV 2. Despite scoring the last of three tries, she couldn't help her side avoid defeat as they went down 52–20.

Pérez was selected in Spain's squad for the 2025 Women's Rugby World Cup in England. She started in the match against Ireland and scored the first try for Spain in their 43–27 loss.
