= Football Stadia Improvement Fund =

Financial organisation for lower level football clubs in England

- Headquarters: Whittington House; 19–30 Alfred Place; London; WC1E 7EA
- Chairman: Peter McCormick
- Premier League Rep.: Richard Scudamore
- FA Representative: Jonathan Hall
- Affiliations: Premier League; The Football Association
- Budget: £6 million (2015)
- Website: www.fsif.co.uk

The Football Stadia Improvement Fund (FSIF) is an organisation that provides grants and loans to lower level football clubs in England. Financing activities are meant to develop the comfort and safety of football grounds and the FSIF is the largest provider for this type of grant in the country. The organisation receives funding exclusively from the Premier League and has contributed more than £50 million to various projects since 2000.

== Significant Investments ==
- £2 million loaned, and later converted into a grant to the York City F.C. for the construction of an 8,000 seat stadium which will open sometime around 2019.
- £1.2 million (withdrawn) to promote the efforts of Supporters Direct.
- £150,000 provided to Cheshunt F.C. for various improvements including floodlights, grandstands, turnstiles, and barrier fencing.
- £100,000 provided to March Town United F.C. for the construction of a new clubhouse.
- £100,000 provided to Bromsgrove Sporting F.C. for the construction of new floodlights, clubhouse refurbishments and wheelchair-accessibility.
- £99,998 provided to the Irchester Sports Association for new pavilion and clubhouse refurbishments.
- £94,000 provided to Runcorn Linnets towards a new ground.
