= Lourdes Alameda =

- Born: Lourdes Alameda Garcia-Moreno; 29 July 1991 (age 35) Madridejos , Spain
- Height: 175 cm (5 ft 9 in)
- Weight: 78 kg (172 lb; 12 st 4 lb)

Rugby union career
- Position: Lock
Senior career
| Years | Team | Apps | (Points) |
| 2011–2019 | Sanse Scrum | | |
| 2019–2026 | AC Bobigny 93 | | |
| 2026– | Rugby Turia | | |
International career
| Years | Team | Apps | (Points) |
| 2013–2025 | Spain | 45 | (35) |
National sevens team
| Years | Team | | Comps |
| 2014 | Spain 7s | | |

Lourdes Alameda Garcia-Moreno (born 29 July 1991) is a Spanish rugby union player. She has competed for Spain in the 2014, 2017 and 2025 Women's Rugby World Cups.

== Early career ==
Alameda first participated in rhythmic gymnastics at the age of three, she later took part in other sports like tennis and badminton.

She first got involved with rugby at 18 while attending the Complutense University of Madrid in 2009. She intended to play handball in college but there wasn't a women's league. There were other sports to choose from but rugby caught her attention. She knew she wanted to play rugby because she knew nothing about it.

== Rugby career ==
Alameda earned her first cap in the 2013 European Qualification Tournament for the 2014 World Cup, she played in the final 20 minutes in Spain’s victory over the Netherlands.

She has played in two Rugby World Cups, and has won the Rugby Europe Championship multiple times. She has also competed for the Spanish sevens team in the Sevens World Series.

She has previously played for the Sanse Scrum Rugby Club in San Sebastián de los Reyes. She first played for them in the 2011–2012 season. In 2019, she joined French club, AC Bobigny 93, in the Élite 1 competition.

In 2023, she got injured after a ruck and couldn’t move her head the following day. However, she continued playing and featured in matches against Italy and the Netherlands. She was later told that she had contracted a cervical radiculopathy and had to go to the hospital for two months.

Alameda was selected in Spain's squad for the 2025 Women's Rugby World Cup in England.

== Personal life ==
Alameda has a degree in Biology.
