= 2020 Rugby Europe Women's Championship =

2020 Women's European Championship
- Countries: Netherlands; Russia; Spain

Final positions
- Champions: Spain
- Runner-up: Russia

Tournament statistics
- Matches played: 3

The 2020 Rugby Europe Women's Championship was the 24th edition of Rugby Europe's top division competition for women's national rugby union teams outside the Six Nations, and the twelfth such tournament for which the European Championship title was awarded. Spain won the title and advanced to the European Qualification Tournament to decide teams for the 2021 Rugby World Cup, with the winner of that tournament qualifying for the World Cup and the runner-up progressing to the repechage.

The tournament was held from 7 March to 11 April 2020 as a knockout competition, with the three highest ranked teams in Europe not participating in the Women's Six Nations competing.

== Format ==
Unlike the previous year, the tournament is a round-robin tournament in which each team will face each other once.

== Table ==
| Pos | Team | Pld | W | D | L | PF | PA | PD | Pts |
|---|---|---|---|---|---|---|---|---|---|
| 1 | Spain | 2 | 2 | 0 | 0 | 143 | 7 | +136 | 11 |
| 2 | Russia | 2 | 1 | 0 | 1 | 34 | 77 | −43 | 4 |
| 3 | Netherlands | 2 | 0 | 0 | 2 | 21 | 114 | −93 | 1 |

== Results ==
2020-03-07
11:50 CET (UTC+1)

| (1 BP) Netherlands | 21–27; Report | Russia |

Amsterdam

2021-03-20
14:00 CET (UTC+1)

| (1 BP) Spain | 56–7; Report | Russia |

Estadio Pedro Escartín, Guadalajara (Spain)

2021-03-27
14:45 CET (UTC+1)

| (1 BP) Spain | 87–0; Report | Netherlands |

Estadio Pedro Escartín, Guadalajara (Spain)
