= Spain women's national rugby union team =

Spain
- Nickname: Las Leonas
- Union: Spanish Rugby Federation
- Head coach: Régis Sonnes
- Captain: Cristina Blanco
- Most caps: Aroa González (74)
First colours	Second colours

World Rugby ranking
- Current: 14 (as of 22 September 2025)

First international
- Spain 0–28 France (2 May 1989)

Biggest win
- Spain 119–0 Finland (A Coruña, Spain; 30 April 2011)

Biggest defeat
- England 97–7 Spain (Leicester, England; 2 August 2025)

World Cup
- Appearances: 7 (First in 1991)
- Best result: 6th place (1991)

The Spain women's national rugby union team played their first match on 2 May 1989, against France, losing 0-28. The team played the Women's Six Nations from 2000 to 2006, but they were replaced by Italy for 2007, in order to mirror the men's tournament.

== History ==
Women's World Rugby Rankings Top 20 rankings as of 6 April 2026
Rank	Change*	Team	Points
1	Steady	England	98.09
2	Steady	Canada	91.53
3	Steady	New Zealand	89.85
4	Steady	France	83.60
5	Steady	Ireland	78.20
6	Steady	Scotland	77.39
7	Steady	Australia	75.46
8	Steady	United States	72.90
9	Steady	Italy	72.37
10	Steady	South Africa	71.62
11	Steady	Japan	69.72
12	Steady	Wales	66.13
13	Steady	Fiji	63.98
14	Steady	Spain	62.42
15	Steady	Samoa	59.72
16	Steady	Hong Kong	57.56
17	Steady	Netherlands	57.42
18	Steady	Russia	55.10
19	Steady	Kazakhstan	53.88
20	▲1	Germany	51.10
*Change from the previous week

Currently there are over 200 clubs in Spain and a league similar to that of male rugby. The first steps were taken in 1913, when women played in secret in schools, but rugby first began to be played seriously at training camps at the School of Architecture of Madrid in the early 70s by a group of architecture students. They formed a group of about 20 girls who trained regularly twice per week and as they were the only ones who practiced, played sided games between themselves. They played well

In the late seventies a group of female PE students taught by Jose Antonio Sancha, a professor of Rugby at Barcelona INEF, decided to train with the men's rugby and played the game seriously (though they were not recognised by the Catalan Federation rugby until 1983).

The first game was played in Barcelona between the BUC and INEF clubs and other clubs quickly formed in different parts of Spain but mainly in the early years only came from Barcelona and Madrid. In a few years female rugby spread to Madrid, the Basque Country and Valencia. In 1991 27 women's teams participating in regional competitions.

The national team first played in Cardiff (Wales) at the Rugby World Cup, where they won the fifth place behind the United States, England, France and New Zealand. In 1994, the Spanish team was unable to come to Scotland because of budgetary problems, however Spain remained one of the top teams in Europe. In 1995 Spain became the unexpected champions of the first European Championship by defeating rival France, in the final 21–6. The 1996 European brought a repeat of that final but this time the Spanish lost by 15–10.

In January 1997 a tour of England took place where Spain and were in the lead against the World Champions until 10 minutes from the end of the match. Only a last minute try by England gave them the win and in European (the first where all the British teams competed) played the final but Spain came 3rd. Spain qualified for the World Championships in Amsterdam and managed a creditable 7th place. Spain again reached the European final in 1999 against France, losing 13–5, after beating Wales (14–8) and Scotland (11–9).

The 2002 World Cup was held in Barcelona, New Zealand retaining its title in defeating (19–9) to England in the final at the Olympic Stadium Lluis Companys. France took the bronze after beating Canada (41–7), while Spain finished in 8th place after yielding to the United States (23–5).

Spain were also members of the Five and Six Nations from 2000 to 2006, finishing third on three occasions and winning 10 of the 33 games they played. However, in 2007 they were replaced by Italy because the Six Nations Committee wished to align the women's tournament with the men's. This has severely reduced Spain's opportunities to play top level international rugby, and may have been a factor in Spain's failure to qualify for the 2010 World Cup. However, they were compensated a little in 2010 when they won the "double" of the European 15s and 7s titles without losing a game.

== Competitive record ==
=== Rugby World Cup ===
Rugby World Cup
Year	Round	Position	Pld	W	D	L	PF	PA
(Wales) 1991	Plate final	6th	5	3	0	2	55	38
(Scotland) 1994	Withdrew							
(Netherlands) 1998	Plate Semi-final	8th	5	1	0	4	71	141
(Spain) 2002	Quarter-finals	8th	4	1	0	3	83	66
(Canada) 2006	Group stage	9th	5	3	0	2	41	132
(England) 2010	Did not qualify							
(France) 2014	Group stage	9th	5	3	0	2	105	86
(Ireland) 2017	Group stage	10th	5	2	0	3	73	134
(New Zealand) 2021	Did not qualify							
(England) 2025	Group stage	—	3	0	0	3	56	126
(Australia) 2029	TBD							
(United States) 2033	TBD							
Total	7/10	6th^{†}	32	13	0	19	484	723
Champion Runner-up Third place Fourth place: * Tied placing ^{†} Best placing / Home venue

=== Five/Six Nations Championship ===
Women's Six Nations Championship record
Year	Position	Pld	W	D	L	PF	PA
2000 Women's Five Nations	3rd place, bronze medalist(s)	4	2	0	2	53	88
2001 Women's Five Nations	3rd place, bronze medalist(s)	4	2	0	2	31	47
2002 Women's Six Nations	4th	5	2	0	3	56	100
2003 Women's Six Nations	6th	5	0	0	5	14	204
2004 Women's Six Nations	3rd place, bronze medalist(s)	5	3	0	2	29	114
2005 Women's Six Nations	4th	5	1	1	3	32	161
2006 Women's Six Nations	6th	5	0	0	5	25	175
Total	3rd (best result)	33	10	1	22	240	889

=== Rugby Europe Women's Championship ===
Rugby Europe Women's Championship record
Year	Position	Pld	W	D	L	PF	PA
(France) 1988 European Cup	Withdrew						
(Italy) 1995 European Championship	1st place, gold medalist(s)	2	2	0	0	27	6
(Spain) 1996 European Championship	2nd place, silver medalist(s)	3	2	0	1	82	15
(France) 1997 European Championship	3rd place, bronze medalist(s)	3	2	0	1	62	19
(Italy) 1999 European Championship	2nd place, silver medalist(s)	3	2	0	1	30	30
(Spain) 2000 European Championship	2nd place, silver medalist(s)	3	2	0	1	71	57
(France) 2001 European Championship	2nd place, silver medalist(s)	3	2	0	1	52	26
(Italy) 2002 European Nations Cup	Withdrew						
(Sweden) 2003 European Championship	1st place, gold medalist(s)	2	2	0	0	45	15
(France) 2004 European Championship	6th	3	1	0	2	48	49
(Germany) 2005 European Championship	Withdrew						
(Italy) 2006 European Nations Cup	Withdrew						
(Spain) 2007 European Championship	3rd place, bronze medalist(s)	4	3	0	1	128	31
(Netherlands) 2008 European Championship	6th	3	1	0	2	52	68
(Sweden) 2009 European Trophy	3rd place, bronze medalist(s)	3	2	0	1	92	18
(France) 2010 European Trophy	1st place, gold medalist(s)	4	4	0	0	145	33
(Spain) 2011 European Trophy	2nd place, silver medalist(s)	4	3	0	1	152	19
(Italy) 2012 European Championship	4th	3	0	0	3	6	175
(Spain) 2013 European Championship	1st place, gold medalist(s)	3	3	0	0	171	7
(Belgium) 2014 European Trophy	Withdrew						
(Switzerland) 2015 European Trophy	Withdrew						
(Spain) 2016 European Championship	1st place, gold medalist(s)	3	3	0	0	208	7
(Belgium) 2018 European Championship	1st place, gold medalist(s)	2	2	0	0	84	7
(European Union) 2019 European Championship	1st place, gold medalist(s)	2	2	0	0	95	0
(European Union) 2020 European Championship	1st place, gold medalist(s)	2	2	0	0	143	7
(European Union) 2022 European Championship	1st place, gold medalist(s)	2	2	0	0	96	0
(European Union) 2023 European Championship	1st place, gold medalist(s)	2	2	0	0	160	5
(European Union) 2024 European Championship	1st place, gold medalist(s)	3	3	0	0	99	5
(European Union) 2025 European Championship	1st place, gold medalist(s)	3	3	0	0	115	24
Total	12 titles	65	50	0	15	2,163	623

== Overall ==
(Full internationals only, updated to 18 April 2026)

Spain Internationals From 1989
Opponent	First Match	Played	Won	Drawn	Lost	For	Against	Win %
Australia	1998	1	0	0	1	15	17	0.00%
Belgium	2010	3	3	0	0	181	0	100.00%
Brazil	2025	1	1	0	0	41	12	100.00%
Canada	1991	3	0	0	3	9	129	0.00%
Czech Republic	2016	1	1	0	0	97	0	100.00%
England	1991	19	2	2	15	145	806	10.53%
Fiji	2023	2	2	0	0	36	27	100.00%
Finland	2011	1	1	0	0	119	0	100.00%
France	1989	20	6	0	14	154	442	30.00%
Germany	1996	3	3	0	0	171	0	100.00%
Hong Kong	2015	4	4	0	0	189	30	100.00%
Ireland	1997	11	6	0	5	154	154	54.55%
Italy	1991	16	10	0	6	297	235	62.50%
Japan	1991	5	2	0	3	151	89	40.00%
Kazakhstan	1998	3	3	0	0	64	20	100.00%
Kenya	2023	1	1	0	0	32	0	100.00%
Madagascar	2024	1	1	0	0	83	0	100.00%
Netherlands	1991	16	16	0	0	673	72	100.00%
New Zealand	1998	1	0	0	1	3	46	0.00%
Portugal	2024	3	3	0	0	88	12	100.00%
Russia	2007	4	4	0	0	178	10	100.00%
Samoa	2006	3	3	0	0	65	22	100.00%
Scotland	1997	23	8	0	15	275	442	34.78%
South Africa	2014	9	3	0	6	179	232	33.33%
Sweden	2004	8	7	0	1	342	24	87.50%
United States	1998	4	0	0	4	35	124	0.00%
Wales	1998	12	7	1	4	177	190	58.33%
Summary	1989	178	97	3	78	4010	3261	54.49%

== Players ==
=== Recent squad ===
On 11 August 2025, Spain named their final 32-player squad to the Women's Rugby World Cup in England.

Note: The age and number of caps listed for each player is as of 22 August 2025, the first day of the tournament.

Player	Position	Date of birth (age)	Caps	Club/province
Cristina Blanco	Hooker	30 September 1995 (aged 29)	31	(England) Trailfinders
Nuria Jou	Hooker	10 November 2001 (aged 23)	11	(Spain) UE Santboiana
Marieta Román	Hooker	12 February 1999 (aged 26)	23	(Spain) Cocodrilas
Inés Antolínez	Prop	16 January 1997 (aged 28)	21	(Spain) El Salvador
Sidorella Bracic	Prop	12 June 1993 (aged 32)	27	(Spain) El Salvador
Mireia de Andrés	Prop	10 September 1999 (aged 25)	9	(Spain) Sant Cugat
Laura Delgado (cc)	Prop	7 April 1990 (aged 35)	51	(England) Harlequins
Eider García	Prop	3 February 2005 (aged 20)	5	(France) Lyon OU
Gemma Silva	Prop	9 May 2005 (aged 20)	6	(Spain) AVR FC Barcelona
Lourdes Alameda	Second row	29 July 1991 (aged 34)	42	(France) AC Bobigny 93
Mónica Castelo	Second row	18 April 1987 (aged 38)	28	(France) Stade Rennais
Elena Martínez	Second row	9 September 1995 (aged 29)	9	(France) Stade Rennais
Ana Peralta	Second row	25 June 2003 (aged 22)	8	(Spain) CRAT
Anna Puig	Second row	14 October 1999 (aged 25)	36	(Spain) UE Santboiana
Victoria Rosell	Second row	30 September 2005 (aged 19)	7	(Spain) Complutense Cisneros
Nerea García	Flanker	17 November 1996 (aged 28)	8	(Spain) El Salvador
Alba Capell	Back row	28 October 2003 (aged 21)	29	(England) Sale Sharks
Valentina Pérez	Back row	27 December 2004 (aged 20)	7	(Spain) Turia
Lia Piñeiro	Back row	18 August 2001 (aged 24)	10	(Spain) Olímpico de Pozuelo
Maider Aresti	Scrum-half	24 July 2003 (aged 22)	13	(Spain) Getxo
Anne Fernández de Corres	Scrum-half	30 May 1998 (aged 27)	35	(Spain) Eibar RT
Bingbing Vergara	Scrum-half	19 April 2005 (aged 20)	9	(Spain) El Salvador
Amàlia Argudo	Fly-half	24 January 2000 (aged 25)	25	(France) Stade Toulousain
Lea Ducher	Centre	29 April 2002 (aged 23)	5	(Spain) Cocodrilas
Clàudia Peña	Centre	26 October 2004 (aged 20)	26	(England) Harlequins
Claudia Pérez	Centre	29 June 2004 (aged 21)	17	(Spain) Majadahonda
Zahía Pérez	Centre	14 January 2004 (aged 21)	30	(Spain) Complutense Cisneros
Alba Vinuesa (cc)	Centre	30 March 1999 (aged 26)	35	(France) Stade Français
Claudia Cano	Wing	2 August 2005 (aged 20)	14	(Spain) Complutense Cisneros
Ana Cortés	Wing	7 November 2006 (aged 18)	6	(Spain) CRC Pozuelo
Tecla Masoko	Wing	20 May 2000 (aged 25)	8	(Spain) El Salvador
Clara Piquero	Wing	11 February 1999 (aged 26)	28	(France) Lons Section Paloise

=== Most capped Players ===
As of 30 October 2022

#	Player	Position	Career	Caps
1.	(Catalonia) Aroa González	Hooker	1997–2017	74
2.	(Basque Country (autonomous community)) Inés Etxegibel	Fly-half	1994–2007	64
2.	(Galicia (Spain)) Rocío García	Prop	2003–2017	64
4.	(Basque Country (autonomous community)) Isabel Rodríguez	Scrum-half	2003–2011	56
5.	(Catalonia) Bárbara Plà	Centre	2004–2017	53
6.	(Community of Madrid) Pilar López	Lock	1996–2003	49
6.	(Basque Country (autonomous community)) Nerea Otxoa de Aspuru	Prop	2003–2013	49
8.	(Balearic Islands) Mercedes Batidor	Flanker	1995–2002	47
9.	(Castilla–La Mancha) María Isabel Pérez	Wing	1991–2002	46
10	(Galicia (Spain)) Helena Roca	Centre / Fly-half	2001–2014	45
10.	(Basque Country (autonomous community)) Karitte Alegria	Number 8	1994–2005	43
10.	(Catalonia) Coral Vila	Fullback	1996–2003	43
10.	(Galicia (Spain)) Paula Medín	Loose forward	2007–2022	43
10.	(Community of Madrid) Patricia García	Scrum-half	2010–2022	43

== See also ==
- Spain women's national rugby sevens team
- Spain men's national rugby union team
