= Clàudia Peña =

Spain international rugby union player

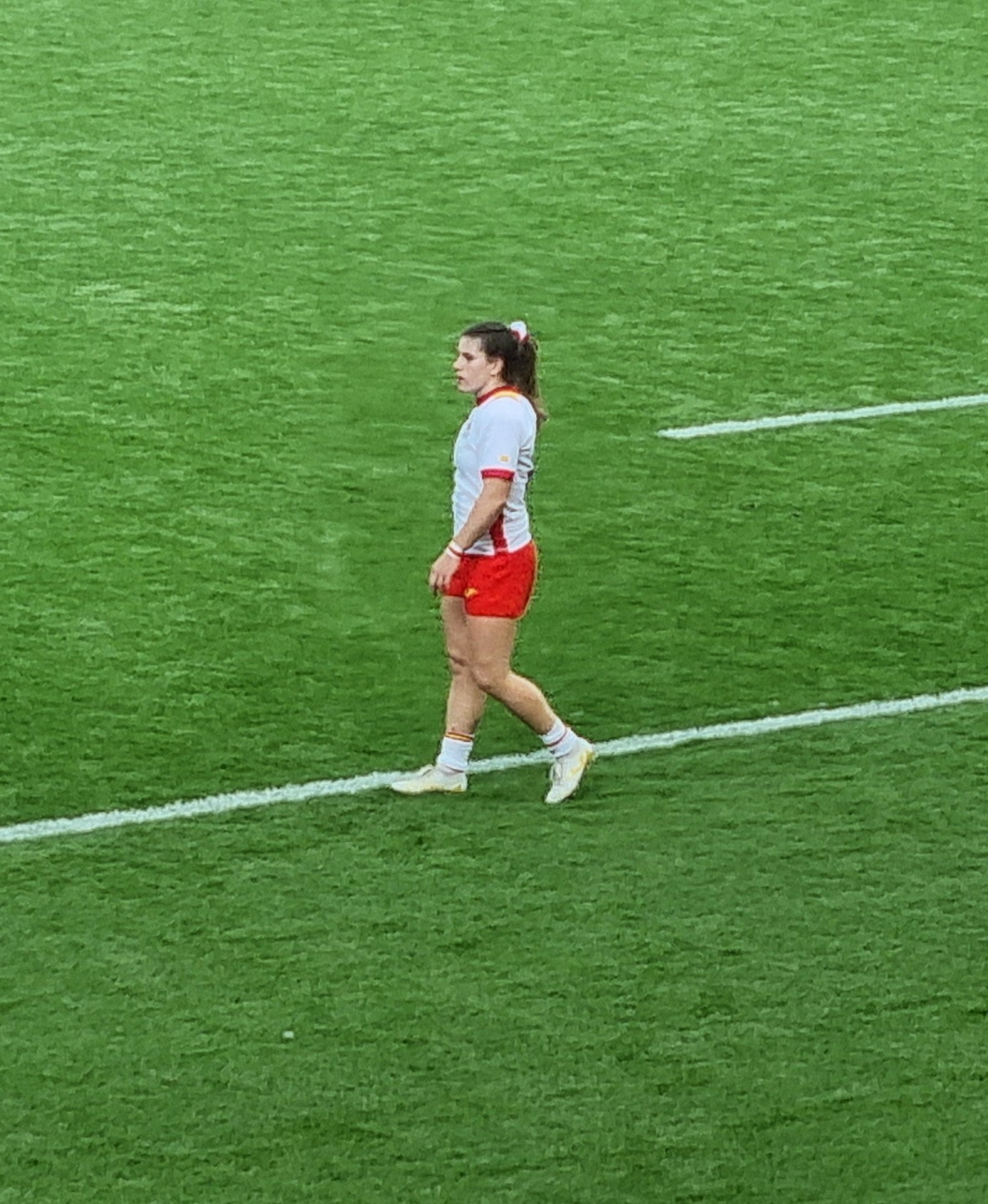
- 2025 Rugby World Cup in Northampton
- Born: 26 October 2004 (age 22) Barcelona, Spain
- Height: 1.65 m (5 ft 5 in)
- Weight: 63 kg (139 lb)

Rugby union career
- Position: Full-back / Centre
- Current team: Harlequins
Amateur team(s)
Years	Team	Apps	(Points)
- AVR FC Barcelona
Senior career
Years	Team	Apps	(Points)
2022-2024	AVR FC Barcelona	14	(177)
2024	Iberians Sitges	2	(4)
2024–	Harlequins	7	(25)
- Correct as of 2025-01-13
International career
Years	Team	Apps	(Points)
2022–Present	Spain	29	(136)
- Correct as of 2025-09-12
National sevens team
Years	Team		Comps
2022–2023	Spain		

Clàudia Peña Hidalgo (born 26 October 2004) is a Spanish rugby union player who plays full-back for the Harlequins team and the Spain women's national rugby union team.

== Rugby career ==
Peña joined AVR FC Barcelona in 2020 when they created a women's team to compete on the 2nd tier of the Catalan league. That season they were promoted to the Catalan Honor Division, and the next one to the Spanish Honor Division B. After another season, they got promoted to the Iberdrola League, top tier of Spanish domestic rugby.

She won her first international cap against Russia in the 2022 Europe Championship.

She played during the 2023 France Women's Sevens in Toulouse where she was chosen as part of the Dream Team of the tournament.

Peña was part of the Spanish squad for 2023 WXV and 2024 WXV. In June 2024 she signed for Harlequins Women.

On 11 August 2025, she was named in the Spanish side to the Women's Rugby World Cup in England.
