= 2025 Rugby Europe Women's Championship =

Tournament details
- Date: 29 March – 19 April 2025
- Teams: Netherlands; Portugal; Spain; Sweden

Final positions
- Champions: Spain (12th title)
- Runner-up: Netherlands

Tournament statistics
- Matches played: 6
- Tries scored: 48 (8 per match)
- Attendance: 3,700 (617 per match)
- Website: Rugby Europe

The 2025 Rugby Europe Women's Championship was the 28th edition of Rugby Europe's first division competition for women's national rugby union teams. It began on 29 March and concluded on 19 April 2025.

No team entered or left the competition as no Rugby Europe Women's Trophy event was held in 2023/24. Spain entered as reigning champions after winning their seventh consecutive title in 2024 after going undefeated throughout the tournament.

Spain won the championship and clinched their 12th European title.

== Standings ==
Pos	Team	Pld	W	D	L	PF	PA	PD	TF	TA	TB	LB	Pts
1	Spain	3	3	0	0	115	24	+91	17	4	1	0	13
2	Netherlands	3	2	0	1	147	35	+112	23	4	2	0	10
3	Portugal	3	1	0	2	50	62	−12	8	8	1	0	5
4	Sweden	3	0	0	3	6	197	−191	0	31	0	0	0

== Fixtures ==
29 March 2025
16:00 WET (UTC+0)

Portugal	7–19	Spain
Try: Elsa Santos 74' c Con: Daniela Correia (1/1) 75'		Try: Clàudia Peña Hidalgo (2) 6' m, 12' c Alba Vinuesa García 30' c Con: Amàlia Argudo Llobregat (2/3) 13', 31'; Cards: Claudia Cano (yellow card) 19'

Estádio Municipal do Cartaxo, Cartaxo
Attendance: 400
Referee: Amber Stamp-Dunstan (WRU)

5 April 2025
16:00 CEST (UTC+2)

Spain	69–0	Sweden
Try: Lea Ducher (2) 10' c, 69' c Claudia Cano 16' m Cristina Blanco 32' c Anna Puig 34' m Valentina Pérez (2) 39' m, 50' c Eider García 44' c Gemma Silva 56' c Clara Piquero 59' m Zahía Pérez 75' c Con: Lea Ducher (7) 11', 33', 45', 51', 57', 70', 76'; Cards: Mireia de Andrés (yellow card) 80'		Cards: Linnéa Flyman (yellow card) 31'

Camp Municipal El Vergeret, Tavernes de la Valldigna
Attendance: 1500
Referee: Maria Heitor (FPR)

6 April 2025
14:00 CEST (UTC+2)

Netherlands	40–5	Portugal
Try: Kika Mulling (2) 30' c, 67' c Esmee Ligtvoet 42' c Isa Prins 50' m Gwen van der Schoot 54' c Gaya van Nifterik 80' c Con: Pleuni Kievit (5) 31', 43', 55', 68', 80+1'		Try: Daniela Correia 71' m

National Rugby Center, Amsterdam
Attendance: 800
Referee: Jenny Lee (RFER)

12 April 2025
12:00 CEST (UTC+2)

Sweden	3–38	Portugal
Pen: Maja Framming 39'; Cards: Isabell Wijkström (yellow card) 25'		Try: Francisca Mendes 13' c Beatriz Rodrigues 28' m Mariana Santos 32' m Raquel Andrade Santos 58' c Daniela Correia 76' c Ana Fernandes 80' c Con: Daniela Correia (4) 14', 59', 77', 80'

Trelleborg Rugby Arena, Trelleborg
Attendance: 200
Referee: Cara Senneka (DRV)

13 April 2025
16:00 CEST (UTC+2)

Spain	27–17	Netherlands
Try: Nerea García 10' c Marieta Román 25' c Lourdes Alameda 51' c Con: Amàlia Argudo (3) 11', 26', 52'; Pen: Amàlia Argudo (2) 65', 76'		Try: Inger Jongerius 6' m Kika Mulling 39' c Linde van der Velden 61' m Con: Pleuni Kievit 40'; Cards: Esmee Ligtvoet (yellow card) 48'

Estadio Nelson Mandela, Torrevieja
Attendance: 500
Referee: Doriane Domenjo (FFR)

19 April 2025
14:00 CEST (UTC+2)

Sweden	3–90	Netherlands
Pen: Maja Framming 44'		Try: Anouk Veerkamp (2) 2' c, 29' c Berte Anniek Nauta (2) 11' c, 40' m Linneke Gevers 15' m Isa Prins 19' c Pleuni Kievit (2) 25' m, 36' c Mariet Luijken 34' c Jara Bunnik 41' c Inger Jongerius 51' c Kyra Elzinga 65' c Isis Touw 71' m Elizabeth Shermer 80' c Con: Pleuni Kievit (10) 3', 12', 20', 30', 35', 37', 42', 52', 66', 81'

Trelleborg Rugby Arena, Trelleborg
Attendance: 300
Referee: Adèle Robert (FBRB)
