= 2022 Rugby Europe Women's Championship =

Rugby union tournament

- Date: 20 February 2022– 27 February 2022
- Countries: 3

Final positions
- Champions: Spain (9th title)

Tournament statistics
- Matches played: 2
- Tries scored: 15 (7.5 per match)
- Attendance: 1,550 (775 per match)
- Top scorer(s): Patricia Garcia (21 points)
- Most tries: Anna Puig (3 tries)

The 2022 Rugby Europe Women's Championship was the 25th edition of the tournament. The competition was held from 20 to 27 February and was played in a round-robin format. Spain thrashed the Netherlands 69–0 in the first match. Spain won the Championship after defeating Russia 27–0 to retain the title.

== Table ==
#	Nation	P	W	D	L	F	A	B	Pts
1	Spain	2	2	0	0	96	0	2	10
2	Russia	1	0	0	1	0	27	0	0
3	Netherlands	1	0	0	1	0	69	0	0

== Results ==
=== Round 1 ===
Test: 1451	February 19, 2022	Netherlands	0–69	Spain	National Rugby Centre Amsterdam
	12:20 AM, 13:20:00 (Local)		Report	Try: Clara PIQUERO (2) 2', 75'; Patricia GARCIA 8'; Elisabet SEGARRA 14'; Lea DUCHER 45'; Anna PUIG (2) 55', 81'; Zahia PEREZ 59'; Julia CASTRO 67'; Monica CASTELO 71'; Olivia FRESNEDA 77'; Con: Patricia GARCIA (3/6) 3', 15', 56'; Lea DUCHER (4/5) 68', 72', 78', 82'	Attendance: 300; Referee: (France) Doriane DOMENJO

LP	1	Nicky DIX
HK	2	Lynn KOELMAN
TP	3	Jara BUNNIK
LL	4	Mhina DE VOS
RL	5	Julia VERHOEVEN
BF	6	Liza DE WILD
OF	7	Judith FRINKING
N8	8	Inger JONGERIUS (c)
SH	9	Esmee LIGTVOET
FH	10	Jet METZ
LW	11	Merel DE GROOT
IC	12	Quen MAKKINGA
OC	13	Hiske BLOM
RW	14	Noa DONKERSLOOT
FB	15	Jordan HEIL
Replacements:
	16	Anouk VEERKAMP
	17	Irene JANSEN
	18	Brechtje KARST
	19	Shereza POOL
	20	Isis TOUW
	21	Inge Maria VAN DER VELDEN
	22	Lieve STALLMANN
	23	Flore VOOGD
Coach:
Sylke HAVERKORN

LP	1	Marta ESTELLES
HK	2	Nuria JOU
TP	3	Sidorella BRACIC
LL	4	Anna PUIG
RL	5	Carmen CASTELLUCCI
BF	6	Olivia FRESNEDA
OF	7	Maria CALVO
N8	8	Maria LOSADA
SH	9	Lucia DIAZ
FH	10	Anne FERNANDEZ (c)
LW	11	Clara PIQUERO
IC	12	Patricia GARCIA
OC	13	Bruna ELIAS
RW	14	Elisabet SEGARRA
FB	15	Lea DUCHER
Replacements:
	16	Laura DELGADO
	17	Iciar POZO
	18	Aleuzenev CID
	19	Monica CASTELO
	20	Lourdes ALAMEDA
	21	Julia CASTRO
	22	Zahia PEREZ
	23	Cristina LOPEZ
Coach:
José BARRIO

=== Round 2 ===
Test: 1453	February 26, 2022	Spain	27–0	Russia	Campo de Rugby Las Terrazas, Madrid
	02:50 AM, 15:50:00 (Local)	Try: Lea DUCHER 14'; Patricia GARCIA 39'; Anna PUIG 70'; Zahia PEREZ 80'; Con: Patricia GARCIA (1/2) 15'; Lea DUCHER (1/2) 71'; Pen: Patricia GARCIA 62'	Report	Cards: Anastasiia CHIRKOVA (yellow card) 61' to 71'	Attendance: 1,250; Referee: (England) Kathie RITCHIE

LP	1	Marta ESTELLES
HK	2	Iciar POZO
TP	3	Laura DELGADO (c)
LL	4	Monica CASTELO
RL	5	Lourdes ALAMEDA
BF	6	Olivia FRESNEDA
OF	7	Maria CALVO
N8	8	Maria LOSADA
SH	9	Lucia DIAZ
FH	10	Anne FERNANDEZ
LW	11	Clara PIQUERO
IC	12	Patricia GARCIA
OC	13	Claudia PENA
RW	14	Bruna ELIAS
FB	15	Lea DUCHER
Replacements:
	16	Sidorella BRACIC
	17	Nuria JOU
	18	Maria ROMAN
	19	Anna PUIG
	20	Carmen RODERA
	21	Julia CASTRO
	22	Zahia PEREZ
	23	Ines BUESO-INCHAUSTI
Coach:
José BARRIO

LP	1	Viktoriia SEMCHENOK
HK	2	Mariia EROSHKINA
TP	3	Tamara AKHMEDOVA
LL	4	Mariia MOLOKOEDOVA
RL	5	Svetlana KUZNETSOVA
BF	6	Diana LOGINOVA
OF	7	Kseniia POZDEEVA
N8	8	Kristine KHACHATURIAN
SH	9	Anastasiia CHIRKOVA
FH	10	Daria LUSHINA (c)
LW	11	Anna GAVRILYUK
IC	12	Alina ARTERCHUK
OC	13	Mariia PERESTIAK
RW	14	Mariia POGREBNIAK
FB	15	Amina SAILAONOVA
Replacements:
	16	Aleksandra EFANOVA
	17	Elmira GADZHIKERIMOVA
	18	Elena LOBACHEVA
	19	Kseniia KRASNOPEROVA
	20	Mariia ISAEVA
	21	Iana DANILOVA
	22	Alsu MARDEEVA
	23	Cholpon CHARGYNOVA
Coach:
Pavel BARANOVSKIY
