= 2021 Rugby World Cup statistics =

This article documents statistics from the 2021 Rugby World Cup, held in New Zealand from 8 October to 12 November 2022.

As of: 5 November 2022

== Team statistics ==
Team statistics
Team	Played	Won	Drawn	Lost	Points for	Points against	Points difference	Tries	Penalty tries	Conversions	Penalty goals	Drop goals	Yellow card	Red card
Australia	4	2	0	2	49	101	–52	7	0	4	2	0	6	2
Canada	5	4	0	1	143	68	+75	23	0	11	2	0	1	0
England	5	5	0	0	239	50	+189	38	0	17	5	0	3	0
Fiji	3	1	0	2	40	145	–105	6	0	5	0	0	4	1
France	5	3	0	2	154	46	+108	20	1	15	4	0	1	0
Italy	4	2	0	2	58	79	–21	8	0	3	3	0	3	0
Japan	3	0	0	3	30	92	–62	5	0	2	0	0	2	0
New Zealand	5	5	0	0	234	56	+178	38	0	19	2	0	4	0
Scotland	3	0	0	3	27	89	–62	5	1	0	0	0	0	0
South Africa	3	0	0	3	22	136	–114	3	0	2	1	0	4	0
United States	4	1	0	3	65	100	–35	9	0	6	2	0	2	0
Wales	4	1	0	3	40	139	–99	5	0	3	3	0	3	0

== Individual statistics ==
Oldest player:

- (Australia) Iliseva Batibasaga: 37 years, 169 days.

Youngest player:

- (Fiji) Sulila Waisega: 18 years, 204 days.

Most experienced player:

- (Australia) Iliseva Batibasaga: 16 years, 12 days since debut (debut: 31 August 2006)

Least experienced player:

- (Australia) Tania Naden: debut
- (Australia) Maya Stewart: debut
- (Canada) Marie Thibault: debut
- (Fiji) Raijieli Daveua: debut
- (Fiji) Siteri Rasolea: debut
- (Fiji) Akanisi Sokoiwasa: debut
- (Fiji) Iris Verebalavu: debut
- (France) Joanna Grisez: debut
- (Italy) Sofia Rolfi: debut
- (United States) Erica Jarell: debut
- (United States) Jett Hayward: debut

Most capped player:

- (England) Sarah Hunter: 137 caps.

Least capped player:

- (Australia) Tania Naden: 0 caps
- (Australia) Maya Stewart: 0 caps
- (Canada) Marie Thibault: 0 caps
- (Fiji) Raijieli Daveua: 0 caps
- (Fiji) Siteri Rasolea: 0 caps
- (Fiji) Akanisi Sokoiwasa: 0 caps
- (Fiji) Iris Verebalavu: 0 caps
- (France) Joanna Grisez: 0 caps
- (Italy) Sofia Rolfi: 0 caps
- (United States) Erica Jarell: 0 caps
- (United States) Jett Hayward: 0 caps

Tallest player:

- (United States) Jenny Kronish: 1.88 m (6 ft 2 in)

Shortest player:

- (Japan) Megumi Abe: 1.47 m (4 ft 10 in).

== Try scorers ==
7 tries

- (New Zealand) Portia Woodman

6 tries

- (Canada) Emily Tuttosi
- (England) Amy Cokayne
- (England) Marlie Packer

5 tries

- (New Zealand) Ruby Tui

4 tries

- (Canada) Paige Farries
- (England) Abigail Dow
- (England) Claudia MacDonald
- (England) Connie Powell
- (France) Joanna Grisez

3 tries

- (Australia) Bienne Terita
- (England) Rosie Galligan
- (France) Marine Ménager
- (New Zealand) Theresa Fitzpatrick
- (New Zealand) Ayesha Leti-I'iga

2 tries

- (Canada) Brianna Miller
- (Canada) Mikiela Nelson
- (Canada) Karen Paquin
- (Canada) Alex Tessier
- (England) Poppy Cleall
- (England) Lydia Thompson
- (England) Abbie Ward
- (France) Émilie Boulard
- (France) Maëlle Filopon
- (France) Romane Ménager
- (France) Laure Sansus
- (France) Gabrielle Vernier
- (Italy) Maria Magatti
- (Italy) Aura Muzzo
- (Italy) Vittoria Ostuni Minuzzi
- (New Zealand) Sylvia Brunt
- (New Zealand) Luka Connor
- (New Zealand) Ruahei Demant
- (New Zealand) Stacey Fluhler
- (New Zealand) Renee Holmes
- (New Zealand) Sarah Hirini
- (New Zealand) Krystal Murray
- (New Zealand) Maia Roos
- (New Zealand) Amy Rule
- (New Zealand) Renee Wickliffe
- (Scotland) Megan Gaffney
- (Scotland) Lana Skeldon
- (United States) Alev Kelter
- (United States) Joanna Kitlinski
- (Wales) Sioned Harries

1 try

- (Australia) Iliseva Batibasaga
- (Australia) Emily Chancellor
- (Australia) Ivania Wong
- (Canada) Tyson Beukeboom
- (Canada) Alysha Corrigan
- (Canada) Olivia DeMerchant
- (Canada) McKinley Hunt
- (Canada) Sara Kaljuvee
- (England) Zoe Aldcroft
- (England) Shaunagh Brown
- (England) Sarah Hunter
- (England) Leanne Infante
- (England) Alex Matthews
- (England) Helena Rowland
- (England) Emily Scarratt
- (Fiji) Lavena Cavuru
- (Fiji) Ilisapeci Delaiwau
- (Fiji) Sesenieli Donu
- (Fiji) Karalaini Naisewa
- (Fiji) Aloesi Nakoci
- (France) Pauline Bourdon
- (France) Annaëlle Deshayes
- (France) Célia Domain
- (France) Caroline Drouin
- (France) Madoussou Fall
- (France) Émeline Gros
- (France) Gaëlle Hermet
- (France) Mélissandre Llorens
- (France) Laure Touyé
- (Italy) Melissa Bettoni
- (Italy) Elisa Giordano
- (Japan) Megumi Abe
- (Japan) Komachi Imaguki
- (Japan) Kyoko Hosokawa
- (Japan) Hinano Nagura
- (Japan) Maki Takano
- (New Zealand) Alana Bremner
- (New Zealand) Chelsea Bremner
- (New Zealand) Liana Mikaele-Tu'u
- (New Zealand) Joanah Ngan-Woo
- (New Zealand) Georgia Ponsonby
- (New Zealand) Awhina Tangen-Wainohu
- (South Africa) Aseza Hele
- (South Africa) Nomawethu Mabenge
- (South Africa) Zintle Mpupha
- (United States) Elizabeth Cairns
- (United States) Jennine Detiveaux
- (United States) Jenny Kronish
- (United States) Hallie Taufo'ou
- (United States) Kate Zackary
- (Wales) Alisha Butchers
- (Wales) Ffion Lewis

== Point scorers ==
Overall points scorers
Player	Team	Total	Details			
Player	Team	Total	Tries	Conversions	Penalties	Drop goals
Emily Scarratt	England	44	1	12	5	0
Caroline Drouin	France	38	1	12	3	0
Renee Holmes	New Zealand	35	2	11	1	0
Portia Woodman	New Zealand	35	7	0	0	0
Ruahei Demant	New Zealand	31	2	9	1	0
Emily Tuttosi	Canada	30	6	0	0	0
Amy Cokayne	England	30	6	0	0	0
Marlie Packer	England	30	6	0	0	0
Sophie de Goede	Canada	26	0	10	2	0
Ruby Tui	New Zealand	25	5	0	0	0
Alev Kelter	United States	24	2	4	2	0
Paige Farries	Canada	20	4	0	0	0
Abigail Dow	England	20	4	0	0	0
Claudia MacDonald	England	20	4	0	0	0
Connie Powell	England	20	4	0	0	0
Joanna Grisez	France	20	4	0	0	0
Michela Sillari	Italy	18	0	3	4	0
Bienne Terita	Australia	15	3	0	0	0
Rosie Galligan	England	15	3	0	0	0
Lavena Cavuru	Fiji	15	1	5	0	0
Marine Ménager	France	15	3	0	0	0
Theresa Fitzpatrick	New Zealand	15	3	0	0	0
Ayesha Leti-I'iga	New Zealand	15	3	0	0	0
Brianna Miller	Canada	14	2	2	0	0
Lori Cramer	Australia	12	0	3	2	0
Zoe Harrison	England	12	0	6	0	0
Mikiela Nelson	Canada	10	2	0	0	0
Karen Paquin	Canada	10	2	0	0	0
Alex Tessier	Canada	10	2	0	0	0
Poppy Cleall	England	10	2	0	0	0
Lydia Thompson	England	10	2	0	0	0
Émilie Boulard	France	10	2	0	0	0
Maëlle Filopon	France	10	2	0	0	0
Romane Ménager	France	10	2	0	0	0
Laure Sansus	France	10	2	0	0	0
Gabrielle Vernier	France	10	2	0	0	0
Maria Magatti	Italy	10	2	0	0	0
Aura Muzzo	Italy	10	2	0	0	0
Vittoria Ostuni Minuzzi	Italy	10	2	0	0	0
Sylvia Brunt	New Zealand	10	2	0	0	0
Luka Connor	New Zealand	10	2	0	0	0
Stacey Fluhler	New Zealand	10	2	0	0	0
Sarah Hirini	New Zealand	10	2	0	0	0
Krystal Murray	New Zealand	10	2	0	0	0
Maia Roos	New Zealand	10	2	0	0	0
Amy Rule	New Zealand	10	2	0	0	0
Renee Wickliffe	New Zealand	10	2	0	0	0
Megan Gaffney	Scotland	10	2	0	0	0
Lana Skeldon	Scotland	10	2	0	0	0
Joanna Kitlinski	United States	10	2	0	0	0
Sioned Harries	Wales	10	2	0	0	0
Helena Rowland	England	9	1	2	0	0
Lina Queyroi	France	8	0	4	0	0
Komachi Imaguki	Japan	7	1	1	0	0
Libbie Janse van Rensburg	South Africa	7	0	2	1	0
Elinor Snowsill	Wales	7	0	2	1	0
Keira Bevan	Wales	6	0	0	2	0
Iliseva Batibasaga	Australia	5	1	0	0	0
Emily Chancellor	Australia	5	1	0	0	0
Ashley Marsters	Australia	5	1	0	0	0
Ivania Wong	Australia	5	1	0	0	0
Tyson Beukeboom	Canada	5	1	0	0	0
Alysha Corrigan	Canada	5	1	0	0	0
Olivia DeMerchant	Canada	5	1	0	0	0
Sara Kaljuvee	Canada	5	1	0	0	0
McKinley Hunt	Canada	5	1	0	0	0
Zoe Aldcroft	England	5	1	0	0	0
Leanne Infante	England	5	1	0	0	0
Ellie Kildunne	England	5	1	0	0	0
Abbie Ward	England	5	1	0	0	0
Ilisapeci Delaiwau	Fiji	5	1	0	0	0
Sesenieli Donu	Fiji	5	1	0	0	0
Karalaini Naisewa	Fiji	5	1	0	0	0
Aloesi Nakoci	Fiji	5	1	0	0	0
Pauline Bourdon	France	5	1	0	0	0
Annaëlle Deshayes	France	5	1	0	0	0
Célia Domain	France	5	1	0	0	0
Madoussou Fall	France	5	1	0	0	0
Émeline Gros	France	5	1	0	0	0
Gaëlle Hermet	France	5	1	0	0	0
Mélissandre Llorens	France	5	1	0	0	0
Melissa Bettoni	Italy	5	1	0	0	0
Elisa Giordano	Italy	5	1	0	0	0
Megumi Abe	Japan	5	1	0	0	0
Kyoko Hosokawa	Japan	5	1	0	0	0
Hinano Nagura	Japan	5	1	0	0	0
Maki Takano	Japan	5	1	0	0	0
Alana Bremner	New Zealand	5	1	0	0	0
Chelsea Bremner	New Zealand	5	1	0	0	0
Liana Mikaele-Tu'u	New Zealand	5	1	0	0	0
Joanah Ngan-Woo	New Zealand	5	1	0	0	0
Georgia Ponsonby	New Zealand	5	1	0	0	0
Awhina Tangen-Wainohu	New Zealand	5	1	0	0	0
Aseza Hele	South Africa	5	1	0	0	0
Nomawethu Mabenge	South Africa	5	1	0	0	0
Zintle Mpupha	South Africa	5	1	0	0	0
Elizabeth Cairns	United States	5	1	0	0	0
Jennine Detiveaux	United States	5	1	0	0	0
Jenny Kronish	United States	5	1	0	0	0
Hallie Taufo'ou	United States	5	1	0	0	0
Kate Zackary	United States	5	1	0	0	0
Alisha Butchers	Wales	5	1	0	0	0
Ffion Lewis	Wales	5	1	0	0	0
Ayasa Otsuka	Japan	3	0	0	1	0
Gabby Cantorna	United States	3	0	0	1	0
Arabella McKenzie	Australia	2	0	1	0	0
Kendra Cocksedge	New Zealand	2	0	1	0	0

== Kicking accuracy ==
Kicking accuracy
Player	Team	Successful	Attempts	Percentage
Lina Queyroi	France	5	5	100%
Libbie Janse van Rensburg	South Africa	3	3	100%
Helena Rowland	England	2	2	100%
Komachi Imaguki	Japan	1	1	100%
Kendra Cocksedge	New Zealand	1	1	100%
Alev Kelter	United States	6	7	86%
Lavena Cavuru	Fiji	5	6	83%
Caroline Drouin	France	11	14	79%
Lori Cramer	Australia	5	7	71%
Michela Sillari	Italy	8	12	67%
Keira Bevan	Wales	2	3	67%
Renee Holmes	New Zealand	10	15	67%
Sophie de Goede	Canada	11	18	61%
Emily Scarratt	England	14	24	58%
Jessy Trémoulière	France	4	7	57%
Elinor Snowsill	Wales	4	7	57%
Ruahei Demant	New Zealand	10	18	56%
Arabella McKenzie	Australia	2	4	50%
Zoe Harrison	England	6	13	46%
Brianna Miller	Canada	2	5	40%
Gabby Cantorna	United States	2	6	33%
Ayasa Otsuka	Japan	1	5	20%
Zenay Jordaan	South Africa	0	1	0%
Holly Aitchison	England	0	4	0%
Hazel Tubic	New Zealand	0	4	0%
Helen Nelson	Scotland	0	6	0%

== Hat-tricks ==
Rank	Player	Team	Opponent	Stage	Result	Venue	Date
1	Claudia MacDonald^{T4}	England	Fiji	Pool	84–19	Eden Park	8 October 2022
2	Portia Woodman	New Zealand	Australia	Pool	41–17	Eden Park	8 October 2022
3	Emily Tuttosi	Canada	Japan	Pool	41–5	Northland Events Centre	9 October 2022
3	Rosie Galligan	England	South Africa	Pool	75–0	Waitakere Stadium	23 October 2022
4	Connie Powell	England	South Africa	Pool	75–0	Waitakere Stadium	23 October 2022
5	Joanna Grisez	France	Italy	Quarter-final	39–3	Northland Events Centre	29 October 2022
6	Marlie Packer	England	Australia	Quarter-final	41–5	Waitakere Stadium	30 October 2022
7	Amy Cokayne	England	New Zealand	Final	31-34	Eden Park	12 November 2022

Key
^{T4}	Scored four tries

== Discipline ==
In total, 3 red cards and 27 yellow cards have been issued during the tournament.

=== Yellow cards ===
2 yellow cards

- (Australia) Shannon Parry (1 vs New Zealand, 1 vs England)
- (Australia) Adiana Talakai (2 vs Scotland)
- (Fiji) Roela Radiniyavuni (2 vs France)
- (Japan) Komachi Imakugi (1 vs United States, 1 vs Italy)

1 yellow card

- (Australia) Grace Kemp (vs Wales)
- (Australia) Ivania Wong (vs New Zealand)
- (Canada) Emma Taylor (vs Italy)
- (England) Zoe Aldcroft (vs Australia)
- (England) Sarah Bern (vs South Africa)
- (England) Victoria Cornborough (vs Canada)
- (France) Safi N'Diaye (vs New Zealand)
- (Fiji) Sereima Leweniqila (vs England)
- (Fiji) Akanisi Sokoiwasa (vs South Africa)
- (Italy) Maria Magatti (vs France)
- (Italy) Vittoria Ostuni Minuzzi (vs United States)
- (Italy) Silvia Turani (vs France)
- (New Zealand) Sarah Hirini (vs Wales)
- (New Zealand) Tanya Kalounivale (vs Scotland)
- (New Zealand) Charmaine McMenamin (vs Wales)
- (New Zealand) Santo Taumata (vs France)
- (United States) Kathryn Johnson (vs Japan)
- (United States) Alev Kelter (vs Canada)
- (South Africa) Nolusindiso Booi (vs England)
- (South Africa) Catha Jacobs (vs England)
- (South Africa) Nomawethu Mabenge (vs Fiji)
- (South Africa) Sizophila Solontsi (vs France)
- (Wales) Cara Hope (vs Scotland)
- (Wales) Jasmine Joyce (vs Scotland)
- (Wales) Carys Williams-Morris (vs New Zealand)

=== Red cards ===
1 red card

- (Australia) Ashley Marsters (vs Scotland) - head-on-head contact with Sarah Law
- (Australia) Adiana Talakai (vs Scotland) - double yellow card
- (Fiji) Roela Radiniyavuni (vs France) - double yellow card
