= 2021 Rugby World Cup Pool C =

Pool C of the 2021 Rugby World Cup began on 8 October 2022 with France taking on South Africa at Eden Park. The pool includes two-time champions England and France, who finished 2nd and 3rd respectively in 2017. They are joined by South Africa, who qualified as champions of the 2021 Rugby Africa Women's Cup, and by debutants Fiji, who qualified for the tournament with their win over Samoa.

== Standings ==
Key to colours in pool tables
Advanced to the quarter-finals as one of the top two teams in a pool
Advanced to the quarter-finals as one of the two best third place teams

Pos	Team	Pld	W	D	L	PF	PA	PD	T	B	Pts
1	England	3	3	0	0	172	26	+146	28	2	14
2	France	3	2	0	1	91	18	+73	14	3	11
3	Fiji	3	1	0	2	40	145	−105	6	0	4
4	South Africa	3	0	0	3	22	136	−114	3	1	1

All times are local New Zealand Daylight Time (UTC+13)

== South Africa vs France ==
8 October 2022
14:15 NZDT (UTC+13)

South Africa	5–40	France (1 BP)
Try: Mabenge 50' m	Report	Try: Sansus (2) 2' c, 67' c Vernier 11' m Boulard 17' c Drouin 70' c Grisez 80+1' c Con: Drouin (2/3) 3', 18'; Queyroi (3/3) 68', 71', 80+2'

Eden Park, Auckland
Attendance: 34,235 (Note: The total attendance was 34,235, which was recorded for all 3 matches)
Referee: Maggie Cogger-Orr (New Zealand)

Team details

FB	15	Nadine Roos
RW	14	Nomawethu Mabenge
OC	13	Zintle Mpupha
IC	12	Aphiwe Ngwevu
LW	11	Simamkele Namba		(substituted off) 61'
FH	10	Libbie Janse van Rensburg		(substituted off) 25'
SH	9	Tayla Kinsey		(substituted off) 50'
N8	8	Aseza Hele
OF	7	Sinazo Mcatshulwa		(substituted off) 58'
BF	6	Sizophila Solontsi	(yellow card) 50'	(substituted off) 60'
RL	5	Rights Mkhari		(substituted off) 62'
LL	4	Nolusindiso Booi (c)
TP	3	Babalwa Latsha
HK	2	Lindelwa Gwala		(substituted off) 68'
LP	1	Sanelisiwe Charlie		(substituted off) 61'
Replacements:
HK	16	Roseline Botes		(substituted in) 68'
PR	17	Asithandile Ntoyanto		(substituted in) 61'
PR	18	Monica Mazibukwana
LK	19	Catha Jacobs		(substituted in) 62'
FL	20	Lusanda Dumke		(substituted in) 60'
SH	21	Unam Tose		(substituted in) 50'
FH	22	Zenay Jordaan		(substituted in) 25'
FB	23	Eloise Webb		(substituted in) 61'
Coach:
(South Africa) Stanley Raubenheimer

FB	15	Chloé Jacquet	(substituted off) 73'
RW	14	Joanna Grisez
OC	13	Maëlle Filopon
IC	12	Gabrielle Vernier	(substituted off) 62'
LW	11	Émilie Boulard
FH	10	Caroline Drouin
SH	9	Laure Sansus	(substituted off) 70'
N8	8	Romane Ménager	(substituted off) 70'
OF	7	Marjorie Mayans	(substituted off) 73'
BF	6	Charlotte Escudero
RL	5	Madoussou Fall
LL	4	Céline Ferer (c)
TP	3	Clara Joyeux	(substituted off) 73'
HK	2	Laure Touyé	(substituted off) 54'
LP	1	Annaëlle Deshayes	(substituted off) 55'
Replacements:
HK	16	Agathe Sochat	(substituted in) 54'
PR	17	Coco Lindelauf	(substituted in) 55'
PR	18	Assia Khalfaoui	(substituted in) 73'
LK	19	Manaé Feleu	(substituted in) 70'
FL	20	Émeline Gros	(substituted in) 73'
SH	21	Pauline Bourdon	(substituted in) 70'
FH	22	Lina Queyroi	(substituted in) 62'
WG	23	Mélissande Llorens	(substituted in) 73'
Coach:
(France) Thomas Darracq

Player of the Match:
Laure Sansus (France)

Touch judges:
Sara Cox (England)
Kat Roche (United States)
Television match official:
Ben Whitehouse (Wales)

Notes:

- Joanna Grisez (France) made her international debut.

== Fiji vs England ==
8 October 2022
16:45 NZDT (UTC+13)

Fiji	19–84	England (1 BP)
Try: Nakoci 31' c Donu 40' c Cavuru 80+1' m Con: Cavuru (2/3) 32', 43'	Report	Try: MacDonald (4) 5' m, 56' m, 70' m, 76' c Cokayne (2) 18' m, 42' m Ward 27' c Rowland 38' c Aldcroft 45' c Thompson (2) 50' c, 53' m Dow 59' c Infante 65' m Powell 74' c Con: Scarratt (5/9) 28', 39', 46', 51', 60'; Harrison (2/5) 75', 78'

Eden Park, Auckland
Attendance: 34,235 (Note: The total attendance was 34,235, which was recorded for all 3 matches)
Referee: Aurélie Groizeleau (France)

Team details

FB	15	Roela Radiniyavuni
RW	14	Aloesi Nakoci
OC	13	Raijieli Laqeretabua		(substituted off) 51'
IC	12	Sesenieli Donu
LW	11	Vitalina Naikore
FH	10	Merewalesi Rokouono		(substituted off) 54'
SH	9	Lavena Cavuru
N8	8	Karalaini Naisewa		(substituted off) 65'
OF	7	Ema Adivitaloga		(substituted off) 51'
BF	6	Sulita Waisega
RL	5	Sereima Leweniqila (c)	(yellow card) 38'
LL	4	Asinate Serevi		(substituted off) 54'
TP	3	Vuanimasei Rasolea		(substituted off) 51'
HK	2	Vika Matarugu		(substituted off) 62'
LP	1	Iris Verebalavu		(substituted off) 51'
Replacements:
HK	16	Bitila Tawake		(substituted in) 62'
PR	17	Bulou Vasuturaga		(substituted in) 51'
PR	18	Mereoni Namositava		(substituted in) 51'
LK	19	Merevesi Ofakimalino		(substituted in) 54'
FL	20	Raijieli Daveua		(substituted in) 51'
SH	21	Akosita Ravato		(substituted in) 65'
FH	22	Ana Maria Roqica		(substituted in) 54'
CE	23	Melaia Matanatabu		(substituted in) 51'
Coach:
(Fiji) Senirusi Seruvakula

FB	15	Ellie Kildunne
RW	14	Lydia Thompson	(substituted off) 57'
OC	13	Emily Scarratt	(substituted off) 57'
IC	12	Helena Rowland
LW	11	Claudia MacDonald
FH	10	Zoe Harrison
SH	9	Leanne Infante	(substituted off) 65'
N8	8	Sarah Hunter (c)	(substituted off) 57'
OF	7	Sadia Kabeya
BF	6	Alex Matthews
RL	5	Abbie Ward
LL	4	Zoe Aldcroft
TP	3	Sarah Bern	(substituted off) 51'
HK	2	Amy Cokayne	(substituted off) 62'
LP	1	Victoria Cornborough	(substituted off) 51'
Replacements:
HK	16	Connie Powell	(substituted in) 62'
PR	17	Hannah Botterman	(substituted in) 51'
PR	18	Maud Muir	(substituted in) 51'
LK	19	Catherine O'Donnell	(substituted in) 54'
FL	20	Poppy Cleall	(substituted in) 57'
SH	21	Lucy Packer	(substituted in) 65'
CE	22	Holly Aitchison	(substituted in) 57'
WG	23	Abigail Dow	(substituted in) 57'
Coach:
(England) Simon Middleton

Player of the Match:
Sadia Kabeya (England)

Touch judges:
Lauren Jenner (New Zealand)
Beatrice Benvenuti (Italy)
Television match official:
Chris Assmus (Canada)

Notes:

- This was the first meeting between the two nations.
- This was Fiji's first World Cup game.
- England's 84 points was the highest number of points they have scored in a World Cup game, surpassing the 82 points they scored against Kazakhstan in 2010.

== France vs England ==
15 October 2022
20:00 NZDT (UTC+13)

(1 BP) France	7–13	England
Try: Hermet 64' c Con: Drouin (1/1) 65'	Report	Try: Scarratt 25' c Con: Scarratt (1/1) 26'; Pen: Scarratt (2/2) 40', 62'

Northland Events Centre, Whangārei
Referee: Joy Neville (Ireland)

Team details

FB	15	Chloé Jacquet	(substituted off) 65'
RW	14	Joanna Grisez
OC	13	Maëlle Filopon
IC	12	Gabrielle Vernier	(substituted off) 78'
LW	11	Émilie Boulard
FH	10	Caroline Drouin
SH	9	Laure Sansus	(substituted off) 13'
N8	8	Romane Ménager	(substituted off) 17'
OF	7	Marjorie Mayans	(substituted off) 71'
BF	6	Charlotte Escudero
RL	5	Madoussou Fall
LL	4	Céline Ferer (c)
TP	3	Clara Joyeux	(substituted off) 72'
HK	2	Agathe Sochat	(substituted off) 65'
LP	1	Annaëlle Deshayes	(substituted off) 48'
Replacements:
HK	16	Laure Touyé	(substituted in) 65'
PR	17	Coco Lindelauf	(substituted in) 48'
PR	18	Assia Khalfaoui	(substituted in) 72'
LK	19	Safi N'Diaye	(substituted in) 71'
FL	20	Gaëlle Hermet	(substituted in) 17'
SH	21	Pauline Bourdon	(substituted in) 13'
CE	22	Lina Queyroi	(substituted in) 78'
WG	23	Marine Ménager	(substituted in) 65'
Coach:
(France) Thomas Darracq

FB	15	Ellie Kildunne
RW	14	Lydia Thompson	(substituted off) 61'
OC	13	Emily Scarratt
IC	12	Helena Rowland
LW	11	Claudia MacDonald
FH	10	Zoe Harrison
SH	9	Leanne Infante
N8	8	Sarah Hunter (c)	(substituted off) 56'
OF	7	Marlie Packer	(substituted off) 66'
BF	6	Alex Matthews
RL	5	Abbie Ward
LL	4	Zoe Aldcroft
TP	3	Sarah Bern	(substituted off) 66'
HK	2	Amy Cokayne
LP	1	Victoria Cornborough	(substituted off) 56'
Replacements:
HK	16	Connie Powell
PR	17	Hannah Botterman	(substituted in) 56'
PR	18	Maud Muir	(substituted in) 66'
LK	19	Catherine O'Donnell	(substituted in) 66'
FL	20	Poppy Cleall	(substituted in) 56'
SH	21	Lucy Packer
CE	22	Holly Aitchison
WG	23	Abigail Dow	(substituted in) 61'
Coach:
(England) Simon Middleton

Player of the Match:
Alex Matthews (England)

Assistant referees:
Aimee Barrett-Theron (South Africa)
Kat Roche (United States)
Television match official:
Ben Whitehouse (Wales)

Notes:

- Sarah Hunter earned her 137th test cap, equalling Rochelle Clark's record for most caps for England and most caps for a female player.
- Marjorie Mayans (France) earned her 50th test cap.
- This was France's first defeat in the pool stage since losing 27–8 to England in 2006.

== Fiji vs South Africa ==
16 October 2022
17:45 NZDT (UTC+13)

Fiji	21–17	South Africa (1 BP)
Try: Delaiwau 13' c Sokoiwasa 40' c Naisewa 79' c Con: Cavuru (3/3) 14', 41', 80+1'	Report	Try: Mpupha 36' c Hele 59' c Con: Janse van Rensburg (2/2) 37', 60'; Pen: Janse van Rensburg (1/1) 79'

Waitakere Stadium, Auckland
Referee: Clara Munarini (Italy)

Team details

FB	15	Roela Radiniyavuni		(substituted off) 61'
RW	14	Akanisi Sokoiwasa	(yellow card) 49'
OC	13	Talei Wilson		(substituted off) 64'
IC	12	Sesenieli Donu
LW	11	Ilisapeci Delaiwau		(substituted off) 60'
FH	10	Merewalesi Rokouono		(substituted off) 60'
SH	9	Lavena Cavuru
N8	8	Karalaini Naisewa
OF	7	Raijieli Daveua
BF	6	Sulita Waisega		(substituted off) 47'
RL	5	Merevesi Ofakimalino
LL	4	Asinate Serevi (c)
TP	3	Vuanimasei Rasolea
HK	2	Vika Matarugu		(substituted off) 63'
LP	1	Iris Verebalavu		(substituted off) 61'
Replacements:
HK	16	Bitila Tawake		(substituted in) 62'
PR	17	Bulou Vasuturaga		(substituted in) 61'
PR	18	Mereoni Namositava
LK	19	Joma Rubuti
FL	20	Ema Adivitaloga		(substituted in) 47'
SH	21	Kolora Lomani		(substituted in) 60'
FH	22	Ana Maria Roqica		(substituted in) 60'
CE	23	Timaima Ravisa		(substituted in) 64'
Coach:
(Fiji) Senirusi Seruvakula

FB	15	Nadine Roos
RW	14	Nomawethu Mabenge	(yellow card) 9'
OC	13	Zintle Mpupha
IC	12	Aphiwe Ngwevu		(substituted off) 49'
LW	11	Simamkele Namba		(substituted off) 40'
FH	10	Libbie Janse van Rensburg
SH	9	Tayla Kinsey		(substituted off) 31'
N8	8	Aseza Hele
OF	7	Sinazo Mcatshulwa
BF	6	Sizophila Solontsi		(substituted off) 48'
RL	5	Rights Mkhari		(substituted off) 53'
LL	4	Nolusindiso Booi (c)
TP	3	Babalwa Latsha		(substituted off) 72'
HK	2	Lindelwa Gwala		(substituted off) 40'
LP	1	Sanelisiwe Charlie		(substituted off) 53'
Replacements:
HK	16	Roseline Botes		(substituted in) 40'
PR	17	Asithandile Ntoyanto		(substituted in) 53'
PR	18	Monica Mazibukwana		(substituted in) 72'
LK	19	Lerato Makua		(substituted in) 53'
FL	20	Lusanda Dumke		(substituted in) 48'
SH	21	Unam Tose		(substituted in) 31'
FH	22	Zenay Jordaan		(substituted in) 49'
FB	23	Eloise Webb		(substituted in) 40'
Coach:
(South Africa) Stanley Raubenheimer

Player of the Match:
Vuanimasei Rasolea (Fiji)

Assistant referees:
Aurélie Groizeleau (France)
Doriane Domenjo (France)
Television match official:
Ian Tempest (England)

Notes:

- This was the first meeting between the two nations.
- Zenay Jordaan earned her 35th test cap, surpassing Zandile Nojoko as the most capped South African female.

== France vs Fiji ==
22 October 2022
18:15 NZDT (UTC+13)

(1 BP) France	44–0	Fiji
Try: M. Ménager 8' m Llorens 28' c Filopon (2) 40' m, 57' m Gros 63' c Boulard 72' m Domain 80' c Con: Trémoulière (3/6) 29', 64', 80+1'; Pen: Trémoulière (1/1) 20'	Report

Northland Events Centre, Whangārei
Referee: Amber McLachlan (Australia)

Team details

FB	15	Émilie Boulard
RW	14	Mélissande Llorens
OC	13	Maëlle Filopon	(substituted off) 65'
IC	12	Caroline Drouin	(substituted off) 58'
LW	11	Marine Ménager
FH	10	Jessy Trémoulière
SH	9	Pauline Bourdon	(substituted off) 62'
N8	8	Émeline Gros
OF	7	Julie Annery
BF	6	Gaëlle Hermet (c)
RL	5	Safi N'Diaye	(substituted off) 74'
LL	4	Céline Ferer	(substituted off) 47'
TP	3	Assia Khalfaoui	(substituted off) 58'
HK	2	Laure Touyé	(substituted off) 58'
LP	1	Coco Lindelauf	(substituted off) 58'
Replacements:
HK	16	Célia Domain	(substituted in) 58'
PR	17	Yllana Brosseau	(substituted in) 58'
PR	18	Rose Bernadou	(substituted in) 58'
LK	19	Manaé Feleu	(substituted in) 47'
FL	20	Charlotte Escudero	(substituted in) 74'
SH	21	Alexandra Chambon	(substituted in) 62'
CE	22	Lina Queyroi	(substituted in) 65'
FB	23	Chloé Jacquet	(substituted in) 58'
Coach:
(France) Thomas Darracq

FB	15	Roela Radiniyavuni	(yellow card) 23' (yellow-red card) 79'
RW	14	Raijieli Laqeretabua		(substituted off) 48'
OC	13	Melaia Matanatabu		(substituted off) 45'
IC	12	Sesenieli Donu		(substituted off) 60'
LW	11	Vitalina Naikore
FH	10	Kolora Lomani
SH	9	Ana Maria Roqica		(substituted off) 29'
N8	8	Sereima Leweniqila
OF	7	Karalaini Naisewa
BF	6	Raijieli Daveua		(substituted off) 45'
RL	5	Merevesi Ofakimalino		(substituted off) 56'
LL	4	Asinate Serevi (c)
TP	3	Siteri Rasolea
HK	2	Vika Matarugu		(substituted off) 58'
LP	1	Iris Verebalavu		(substituted off) 58'
Replacements:
HK	16	Bitila Tawake		(substituted in) 58'
PR	17	Mereoni Vonosere		(substituted in) 58'
PR	18	Bulou Vasuturaga		(substituted in) 60'
LK	19	Sulita Waisega		(substituted in) 56'
FL	20	Ema Adivitaloga		(substituted in) 45'
SH	21	Lavena Cavuru		(substituted in) 29'
FH	22	Rusila Nagasau		(substituted in) 48'
CE	23	Talei Wilson		(substituted in) 45'
Coach:
(Fiji) Senirusi Seruvakula

Player of the Match:
Pauline Bourdon (France)

Assistant referees:
Julianne Zussman (Canada)
Beatrice Benvenuti (Italy)
Television match official:
Chris Assmus (Canada)

Notes:

- This was the first meeting between the two nations.

== England vs South Africa ==
23 October 2022
17:45 NZDT (UTC+13)

(1 BP) England	75–0	South Africa
Try: Galligan (3) 6' m, 29' m, 53' m P. Cleall (2) 23' c, 59' m Brown 32' c Powell (3) 36' m, 41' c, 69' m M. Packer 51' c Kabeya (2) 62' m, 78' c Dow 64' m Con: Harrison (4/8) 24', 33', 42', 51'; Rowland (1/1) 78'	Report

Waitakere Stadium, Auckland
Referee: Lauren Jenner (New Zealand)

Team details

FB	15	Sarah McKenna		(substituted off) 70'
RW	14	Abigail Dow
OC	13	Holly Aitchison
IC	12	Tatyana Heard
LW	11	Jess Breach
FH	10	Zoe Harrison		(substituted off) 54'
SH	9	Lucy Packer		(substituted off) 68'
N8	8	Poppy Cleall
OF	7	Marlie Packer (c)		(substituted off) 68'
BF	6	Morwenna Talling
RL	5	Catherine O'Donnell		(substituted off) 50'
LL	4	Rosie Galligan
TP	3	Shaunagh Brown		(substituted off) 70'
HK	2	Connie Powell		(substituted off) 70'
LP	1	Hannah Botterman		(substituted off) 50'
Replacements:
HK	16	Amy Cokayne		(substituted in) 70'
PR	17	Maud Muir		(substituted in) 50'
PR	18	Sarah Bern	(yellow card) 80'	(substituted in) 70'
LK	19	Zoe Aldcroft		(substituted in) 68'
FL	20	Sadia Kabeya		(substituted in) 50'
SH	21	Leanne Infante		(substituted in) 68'
FH	22	Helena Rowland		(substituted in) 70'
FB	23	Ellie Kildunne		(substituted in) 54'
Coach:
(England) Simon Middleton

FB	15	Eloise Webb
RW	14	Nomawethu Mabenge		(substituted off) 57'
OC	13	Simamkele Namba
IC	12	Chumisa Qawe
LW	11	Nadine Roos
FH	10	Zenay Jordaan		(substituted off) 63'
SH	9	Tayla Kinsey		(substituted off) 46'
N8	8	Aseza Hele
OF	7	Lerato Makua
BF	6	Lusanda Dumke
RL	5	Catha Jacobs	(yellow card) 14'
LL	4	Nolusindiso Booi (c)	(yellow card) 32'	(substituted off) 63'
TP	3	Babalwa Latsha		(substituted off) 72'
HK	2	Lindelwa Gwala		(substituted off) 63'
LP	1	Sanelisiwe Charlie		(substituted off) 55'
Replacements:
HK	16	Micke Günter		(substituted in) 63'
PR	17	Yonela Ngxingolo		(substituted in) 55'
PR	18	Azisa Mkiva		(substituted in) 72'
LK	19	Nompumelelo Mathe		(substituted in) 63'
FL	20	Sizophila Solontsi		(substituted in) 46'
SH	21	Rumandi Potgieter
FH	22	Jakkie Cilliers		(substituted in) 57'
FB	23	Chuma Qawe		(substituted in) 63'
Coach:
(South Africa) Stanley Raubenheimer

Player of the Match:
Tatyana Heard (England)

Assistant referees:
Hollie Davidson (Scotland)
Tyler Miller (Australia)
Television match official:
Lee Jeffrey (New Zealand)

Notes:

- England became the first women's side to play 300 test matches.
- Marlie Packer captained England for the first time.
- Victoria Cornborough and Emily Scarratt were initially named on the England bench at 17 and 22, but withdrew due to injury. Maud Muir was demoted to the bench from tighthead and Shaunagh Brown was added to the starting team, while Ellie Kildunne, replaced Scarratt, pushing Helena Rowland to 22.
