= World Rugby Women's 15s Dream Team of the Year =

Women's 15s Dream Team of the Year
- Date: 2021; 5 years ago
- Presented by: World Rugby
- First award: 2021

World Rugby Women's 15s Dream Team of the Year was first presented in 2021 by World Rugby. They were voted by a panel of international past players and coaches, World Rugby Hall of Fame inductees and rugby media. The 2021 panel were Liza Burgess (WAL), Lynne Cantwell (IRE), Fiona Coghlan (IRE), Stephen Jones (The Sunday Times, WAL), Gaëlle Mignot (FRA), Jillion Potter (USA), Melodie Robinson (NZL), Karl Te Nana (NZL), and Danielle Waterman (ENG).

In 2021, Canada, Italy, New Zealand and Wales each had one player in the selection; France had six players and England had five. There was a total of 539 caps across the Dream Team.

== Dream Team of the Year ==
Year	Team	Refs
2021	1. (France) Annaëlle Deshayes; 2. (France) Agathe Sochat; 3. (England) Sarah Bern; 4. (France) Safi N’Diaye; 5. (England) Abbie Ward; 6. (England) Zoe Aldcroft; 7. (Canada) Karen Paquin; 8. (England) Poppy Cleall; 9. (France) Laure Sansus; 10. (France) Caroline Drouin; 11. (England) Abby Dow; 12. (Italy) Beatrice Rigoni; 13. (New Zealand) Stacey Fluhler; 14. (France) Caroline Boujard; 15. (Wales) Jasmine Joyce	
2022	1. (United States) Hope Rogers; 2. (Canada) Emily Tuttosi; 3. (England) Sarah Bern; 4. (England) Abbie Ward; 5. (France) Madoussou Fall; 6. (England) Alex Matthews; 7. (England) Marlie Packer; 8. (Canada) Sophie de Goede; 9. (France) Laure Sansus; 10. (New Zealand) Ruahei Demant; 11. (New Zealand) Ruby Tui; 12. (New Zealand) Theresa Fitzpatrick; 13. (England) Emily Scarratt; 14. (New Zealand) Portia Woodman; 15. (England) Abby Dow	
2023	1. (New Zealand) Krystal Murray; 2. (England) Lark Atkin-Davies; 3. (England) Sarah Bern; 4. (England) Zoe Aldcroft; 5. (New Zealand) Maia Roos; 6. (England) Alex Matthews; 7. (England) Marlie Packer; 8. (New Zealand) Liana Mikaele-Tu'u; 9. (France) Pauline Bourdon Sansus; 10. (New Zealand) Ruahei Demant; 11. (England) Abby Dow; 12. (France) Gabrielle Vernier; 13. (New Zealand) Amy du Plessis; 14. (New Zealand) Ruby Tui; 15. (England) Ellie Kildunne	
2024	1. (United States) Hope Rogers; 2. (New Zealand) Georgia Ponsonby; 3. (England) Maud Muir; 4. (England) Zoe Aldcroft; 5. (Canada) Laetitia Royer; 6. (Ireland) Aoife Wafer; 7. (Canada) Sophie de Goede; 8. (England) Alex Matthews; 9. (France) Pauline Bourdon Sansus; 10. (England) Holly Aitchison; 11. (New Zealand) Katelyn Vaha'akolo; 12. (Canada) Alex Tessier; 13. (New Zealand) Sylvia Brunt; 14. (England) Abby Dow; 15. (England) Ellie Kildunne	
2025	1. (England) Hannah Botterman; 2. (Canada) Emily Tuttosi; 3. (England) Maud Muir; 4. (Canada) Sophie de Goede; 5. (England) Abbie Ward; 6. (England) Alex Matthews; 7. (New Zealand) Jorja Miller; 8. (New Zealand) Kaipo Olsen-Baker; 9. (Canada) Justine Pelletier; 10. (England) Zoe Harrison; 11. (France) Joanna Grisez; 12. (New Zealand) Sylvia Brunt; 13. (England) Megan Jones; 14. (New Zealand) Braxton Sorensen-McGee; 15. (England) Ellie Kildunne	
2026	1. (England) Hannah Botterman; 2. (England) Amy Cokayne; 3. (Canada) DaLeaka Menin; 4. (Canada) Sophie de Goede; 5. (New Zealand) Maia Roos; 6. (England) Maddie Feaunati; 7. (France) Léa Champon; 8. (New Zealand) Kaipo Olsen-Baker; 9. (Canada) Olivia Apps; 10. (England) Zoe Harrison; 11. (New Zealand) Ayesha Leti-I'iga; 12. (New Zealand) Sylvia Brunt; 13. (England) Megan Jones; 14. (England) Jess Breach; 15. (New Zealand) Braxton Sorensen-McGee	

== Statistics ==
Selections by Player
4	(Canada) Sophie de Goede
4	(England) Abby Dow
4	(England) Alex Matthews
3	(England) Zoe Aldcroft
3	(England) Sarah Bern
3	(England) Ellie Kildunne
3	(England) Abbie Ward
3	(New Zealand) Sylvia Brunt
2	(Canada) Emily Tuttosi
2	(England) Hannah Botterman
2	(England) Amy Cokayne
2	(England) Zoe Harrison
2	(England) Megan Jones
2	(England) Maud Muir
2	(England) Marlie Packer
2	(France) Laure Sansus
2	(France) Pauline Bourdon Sansus
2	(New Zealand) Ruahei Demant
2	(New Zealand) Kaipo Olsen-Baker
2	(New Zealand) Braxton Sorensen-McGee
2	(New Zealand) Maia Roos
2	(New Zealand) Ruby Tui
2	(United States) Hope Rogers

Selections by Country
37	England
23	New Zealand
13	France
12	Canada
2	United States
1	Italy
1	Ireland
1	Wales
