= International Rugby Players Women's Try of the Year =

IRP Women's Try of the Year
- Awarded for: Best Try of the Year
- Date: 2021; 5 years ago
- Presented by: World Rugby
- First award: 2021
- Currently held by: (New Zealand) Maia Joseph (2025)

The International Rugby Players Women's Try of the Year was first presented in 2021 and is awarded to the best women's 15s tries scored during international test matches within the voting year. The inaugural winner was Emilie Boulard of France. In similar fashion to the Men's Try of the Year, the try is voted on by the fans from four nominations that have been shortlisted by the IRP panel; The panel comprises Conrad Smith (NZL, chair), Rachael Burford (ENG), Thierry Dusautoir (FRA), Fiao'o Fa'amausili (NZL), Bryan Habana (RSA) and Jamie Heaslip (IRE).

== Winners & Nominees ==
Year	Image	Winning Player	Team	Match	Video	Nominees	Ref(s)
2021	Emilie Boulard in 2023	Emilie Boulard	France	France vs Wales (2021 Six Nations)	Video	(France) Romane Ménager (England) Abby Dow (Italy) Sara Barattin	
2022	Abby Dow in 2021	Abby Dow	England	England vs Canada (2021 Rugby World Cup)	Video	(New Zealand) Sylvia Brunt (Australia) Emily Chancellor (Ireland) Linda Djougang (South Africa) Nomawethu Mabenge	
2023	Sofia Stefan in 2014	Sofia Stefan	Italy	Italy vs Ireland (2023 Six Nations)	Video	(France) Charlotte Escudero (England) Zoe Aldcroft (New Zealand) Mererangi Paul	
2024	Marine Menager in 2024	Marine Ménager	France	France vs Canada (2024 WXV)	Video	(Italy) Alyssa D'Inca (New Zealand) Georgia Ponsonby (Australia) Maya Stewart	
2025		Maia Joseph	New Zealand	New Zealand vs Ireland (2025 Rugby World Cup)	Video	(England) Jess Breach (Fiji) Kolora Lomani (Italy) Vittoria Ostuni Minuzzi	
2026	Pauline Bourdon Sansus in 2023	Pauline Bourdon Sansus	France	France vs England (2026 Women's Six Nations Championship)			
