= World Rugby Women's 15s Player of the Year =

- Awarded for: Best Women's 15s Player of the Year
- Date: 2015; 11 years ago
- Presented by: World Rugby
- First award: 2015
- Currently held by: (Canada) Sophie de Goede (2025)
- Website: World Rugby Awards

The World Rugby Women's 15s Player of the Year is awarded annually by World Rugby at the World Rugby Awards. The award is open to all women's 15s players who have played international test matches in the voting year, voting is assessed on international test matches only. Prior to 2015, the IRB presented the Women's Player of the Year award from 2001 to 2002, and in 2012 and 2014. The IRB Women's Personality of the Year award was presented from 2003 to 2011.

== Winners and nominees ==
Year	Image	Winning player	Other nominees	Ref(s)
IRB Women's Player of the Year
2001	—N/a	(England) Shelley Rae		
2002	—N/a	(New Zealand) Monique Hirovanaa		
IRB Women's Personality of the Year
2003	Kathy Flores in 2007	(United States) Kathy Flores		
2004	—N/a	(Scotland) Donna Kennedy		
2005	Farah Palmer in 2007	(New Zealand) Farah Palmer		
2006	Maggie Alphonsi in 2011	(England) Maggie Alphonsi	(France) Delphine Plantet (New Zealand) Anna Richards	
2007	—N/a	(Australia) Sarah Corrigan		
2008	—N/a	(England) Carol Isherwood		
2009	—N/a	(Australia) Debby Hodgkinson		
2010		(New Zealand) Carla Hohepa	(England) Margaret Alphonsi (England) Danielle Waterman (Australia) Nicole Beck	
2011	—N/a	(Hong Kong) Ruth Mitchell		
IRB Women's Player of the Year
2012	—N/a	(England) Michaela Staniford		
2014		(Canada) Magali Harvey	(France) Safi N'Diaye (Canada) Kelly Russell (Ireland) Niamh Briggs	
World Rugby Women's 15s Player of the Year
2015	Kendra Cocksedge in 2010	(New Zealand) Kendra Cocksedge	(France) Gaëlle Mignot (Ireland) Sophie Spence	
2016	Sarah Hunter in 2022	(England) Sarah Hunter	(New Zealand) Fiao'o Fa'amausili (France) Gaëlle Mignot	
2017	Portia Woodman in 2016	(New Zealand) Portia Woodman		
2018	Jessy Trémoulière in 2018	(France) Jessy Trémoulière		
2019	Emily Scarratt in 2014	(England) Emily Scarratt	(England) Katy Daley-McLean (England) Sarah Bern (New Zealand) Kendra Cocksedge (France) Pauline Bourdon	
2021		(England) Zoe Aldcroft	(France) Caroline Boujard (England) Poppy Cleall (France) Laure Sansus	
2022	Ruahei Demant in 2022	(New Zealand) Ruahei Demant	(Canada) Sophie de Goede (England) Alex Matthews (France) Laure Sansus (New Zealand) Portia Woodman	
2023	Marlie Packer in 2019	(England) Marlie Packer	(New Zealand) Ruahei Demant (England) Abby Dow (France) Gabrielle Vernier	
2024	Elliw Kildunne 2021	(England) Ellie Kildunne	(France) Pauline Bourdon (England) Alex Matthews (Canada) Alex Tessier	
2025		(Canada) Sophie de Goede	(England) Megan Jones (New Zealand) Jorja Miller	
2026	—N/a	(New Zealand) Kaipo Olsen-Baker	(England) Zoe Harrison (England) Megan Jones (Canada) DaLeaka Menin	
