= Émeline Gros =

French rugby player

- Born: 19 August 1995 (age 31)
- Height: 168 cm (5 ft 6 in)
- Weight: 73 kg (161 lb; 11 st 7 lb)

Rugby union career
- Position: Number 8
Senior career
Years	Team	Apps	(Points)
2013–20	FC Grenoble Amazones		
2020–22	Montpellier HR		
2022–	FC Grenoble Amazones		
International career
Years	Team	Apps	(Points)
2017–	France	20	(0)

Emeline Gros (born 19 August 1995) is a French rugby union player who plays for FC Grenoble Amazones and the France women's national rugby union team.

== Personal life ==
Gros qualified as a nurse in July 2019. During the COVID-19 pandemic she worked full time in a nursing home in Isère.

== Career ==
Gros played for FC Grenoble Amazones from 2013 and won the Elite 2 championships in 2018 before joining Montpellier Hérault Rugby in 2020 for two seasons before returning to FC Grenoble Amazones in 2022.

She made her French debut in November 2017 against Spain, and in July 2019 she scored her country's first try against the United States. She was named in France's team for the delayed 2021 Rugby World Cup in New Zealand.

Gros was named in France's squad for the 2023 Women's Six Nations Championship.
