= Gaëlle Hermet =

French rugby player

- Born: 12 June 1996 (age 30)
- Height: 172 cm (5 ft 8 in)

Rugby union career
International career
Years	Team	Apps	(Points)
2016–	France		

Gaëlle Hermet (born 12 June 1996) is a French rugby union player who plays as a flanker for the France women's national rugby union team and Stade Toulousain. Hermet first captained France at the age of 21.

== Career ==
Hermet won her first cap for France in 2016 and was named captain of the national team in November 2017. She led the team to their grand-slam winning Women's Six Nations Championship campaign in 2018 and that year she was nominated for the World Rugby’s Women's Player of the Year award, which eventually went to her France teammate Jessy Tremouliere. In 2022, she was named captain of France's team for the delayed 2021 Rugby World Cup in New Zealand.

== Personal life ==
Hermet studied psychology at the University of Toulouse-Jean Jaurès before going on to study occupational health. She works at a nursing home in Cadours alongside her rugby and during the COVID-19 pandemic was working full time in the care sector.
