= Nomawethu Mabenge =

South African rugby union player

- Born: 27 August 1996 (age 30)
- Height: 1.66 m (5 ft 5 in)
- Weight: 81 kg (179 lb)

Rugby union career
- Position: Winger
International career
Years	Team	Apps	(Points)
2021–	South Africa	11	(30)

Nomawethu Mabenge (born 27 August 1996) is a South African rugby union player who plays as an Outside Back for the EP Queens and the South Africa women's national rugby union team. In 2022 she was nominated for the International Rugby Players Women's Try of the Year award.

== Early life ==
"Weto" Mabenge is from Gqeberha, formerly Port Elizabeth, in the Eastern Cape province of South Africa.

== Career ==
In September 2022 Mabenge was named in the South Africa squad for the delayed 2021 Rugby World Cup, held in New Zealand. Mabenge scored South Africa’s first try at the World Cup, in their opening match against France, and in total scored five tries in seven appearances through 2022 for South Africa.

Mabenge was nominated for the "International Rugby Players Women’s Try of the Year" for her try during the South Africa, v Spain on 12 August 2022 in Potchefstroom. She was said to have "combined strength, agility and pace to run in from halfway against Spain to score".

== Personal life ==
Mabenge is nicknamed "Sbu" after her male counterpart in the South African rugby team Sbu Nkosi.
