= Maëlle Filopon =

French rugby player

- Born: 27 May 1997 (age 29)
- Height: 1.8 m (5 ft 11 in)
- Weight: 82 kg (181 lb)

Rugby union career
- Position: Winger
International career
Years	Team	Apps	(Points)
2016–	France	18	(0)

Maëlle Filopon (born 27 May 1997) is a French rugby union player. She plays for the France women's national rugby union team and Stade Toulousain.

== Career ==
From Grenoble, she also competed in judo as a child before concentrating on rugby from 12 years-old. Filopon scored a try on her home ground at the Stade des Alpes, against New Zealand, as France secured their first ever victory over the Black Ferns in November 2019. She was named in France's team for the delayed 2021 Rugby World Cup in New Zealand.

Filopon was named in France's squad for the 2023 Women's Six Nations Championship.
