= Célia Domain =

French international rugby union player

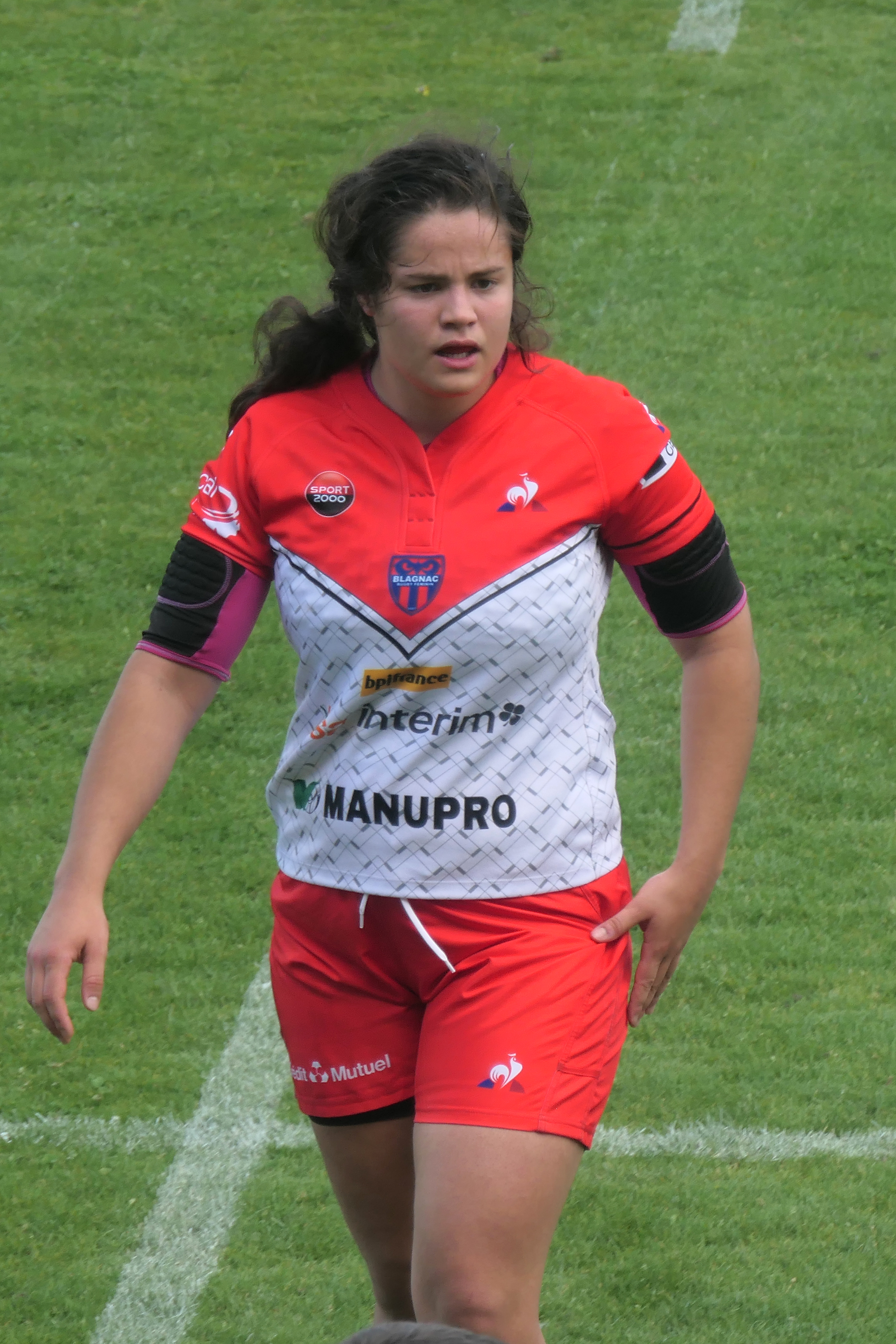
- Born: 29 April 2000 (age 26)
- Height: 170 cm (5 ft 7 in)

Rugby union career
- Position: Hooker
Senior career
Years	Team	Apps	(Points)
	Blagnac SCR		(0)
International career
Years	Team	Apps	(Points)
2018–Present	France	7	(0)

Célia Domain (born 29 April 2000) is a French rugby union player. She plays for the France women's national rugby union team and Blagnac SCR. She was part of France's squad at the delayed 2021 Rugby World Cup.

== Rugby career ==
Domain was selected for the French senior team for the first time in 2018. She was named in France's team for the delayed 2021 Rugby World Cup in New Zealand.

Domain was named in France's squad for the 2023 Women's Six Nations Championship. On 7 March 2025, she was selected in the side for the Women's Six Nations Championship.
