= Céline Ferer =

French rugby player (born 1991)

- Born: 21 June 1991 (age 35)
- Height: 180 cm (5 ft 11 in)

Rugby union career
- Position: Lock
Senior career
Years	Team	Apps	(Points)
2010–19	AS Bayonne		
2019–22	Stade Toulousain		
International career
Years	Team	Apps	(Points)
2015–22	France	60	(0)
Coaching career
- Years: Team
- 2022–: Stade Toulousain (Assistant)

Céline Ferer (born 21 June 1991) is a French rugby union coach and former player. She played for the France women's national rugby union team, which she has also captained, and Stade Toulousain.

== Career ==
Ferer had been Aviron Bayonnais's captain before joining Stade Toulousain in 2019. After 9 years with Bayonne, she initially turned down the advances from Toulouse but didn’t feel she could turn them down a second time with new opportunities on offer.

She was named in France's team for the delayed 2021 Rugby World Cup in New Zealand. She was named as captain for the French side for their opening match against South Africa in the World Cup.
