= Thomas Darracq =

- Born: June 11, 1977 (age 49)

Rugby union career
Coaching career
- Years: Team
- 2022–: France Women's XV's

Thomas Darracq (born 11 June 1977) is a French rugby union coach.

Darracq studied sports psychology at the University of Bordeaux. He began his coaching career at Pays Médoc, where he took the team from the French regional divisions into the third tier. He then worked as a strength and conditioning coach for the French Rugby Federation for seven years.

Darracq was announced as the new head coach of the France women's national rugby union team after the 2022 Six Nations.
