= Nolusindiso Booi =

South African rugby union player (born 1985)

- Born: 29 June 1985 (age 41) Xesi, Cape Province, South Africa
- Height: 172 cm (5 ft 8 in)
- Weight: 80 kg (176 lb)
- University: University of Fort Hare

Rugby union career
- Position: Lock
Senior career
Years	Team	Apps	(Points)
–2025	Western Province		
International career
Years	Team	Apps	(Points)
2010–2025	South Africa	55	(5)

Nolusindiso “Cindy” Booi (born 29 June 1985), is a South African international rugby union player whose regular playing position is as a Lock. She has competed for South Africa in three Rugby World Cups — 2010, 2014 and 2021.

== Early life and career ==
Booi played cricket as a youngster because it was the sport of choice in her village. She was not exposed to rugby growing up and only took up the sport later in life.

== Rugby career ==
Booi made her international debut against Kazakhstan in Dubai in 2010.

She participated in the 2010 and 2014 Rugby World Cups. She has also represented the Springbok Women’s Sevens team.

In 2022, she played for the Western Province. She had 30 caps for the South African national team when she was selected in September 2022 to play for her country in the World Cup in New Zealand.

Booi earned her 50th cap for the Springbok women when they thrashed Spain 48–26 in April 2025. She was the first female player to play 50 tests for South Africa.

She was named as captain of the South African side at the Women's Rugby World Cup in England. She featured in her team's 66–6 trouncing of Brazil in their opening game of the tournament.

She retired from international rugby career the Rugby World Cup.

== Personal life ==
Booi was a Business Management student at the Cape Peninsula University of Technology.
