= Émilie Boulard =

France international rugby union player

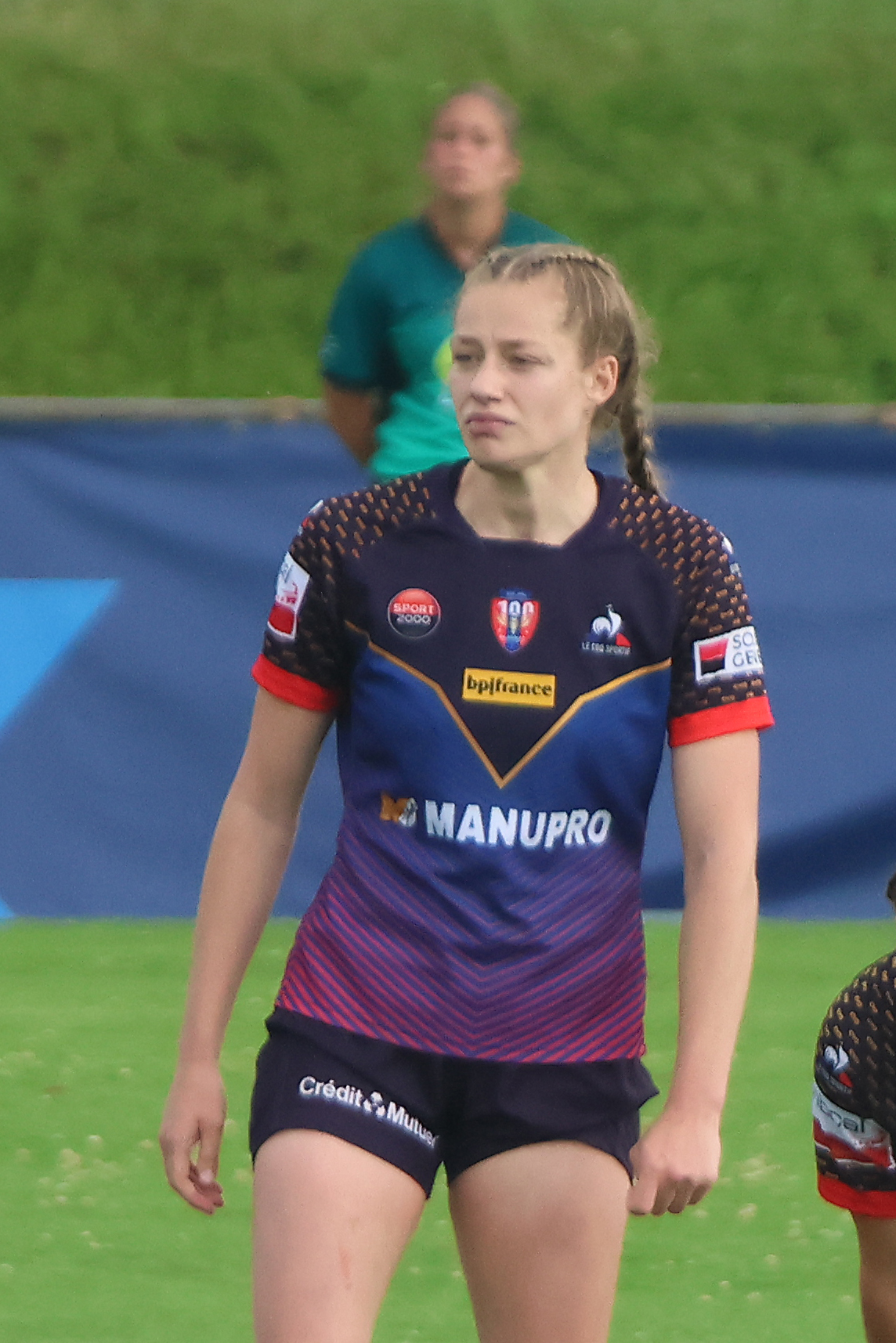
- Born: 23 August 1999 (age 27)
- Height: 177 cm (5 ft 10 in)

Rugby union career
- Position: Fullback
Senior career
| Years | Team | Apps | (Points) |
| 2023– | Blagnac SCR | | (0) |
International career
| Years | Team | Apps | (Points) |
| 2021– | France | 41 | (105) |

Émilie Boulard (born 23 August 1999) is a French rugby union player who plays for the France women's national rugby union team as a full-back. She won the International Rugby Players Women's Try of the Year at the 2021 World Rugby Awards. She represented France at the delayed 2021 Rugby World Cup, played in late 2022 after being delayed due to the COVID-19 pandemic.

== Career ==
Boulard began her club rugby aged 18 playing for RC Chilly-Mazarin. She won her first senior cap in April 2021 against Wales in the Women's Six Nations Championship. In doing so she became the first Chilly-Mazarin player ever to be selected to play for France. She subsequently won the International Rugby Players Women's Try of the Year at the 2021 World Rugby Awards, for a try she scored in her debut game against Wales. In September 2022 She was one of three players nominated for the award for the best French international for the 2021–2022 season, with the award ultimately going to Laure Sansus. It was also announced Boulard would be joining Blagnac SCR for the following season.

She was named in France's team for the delayed 2021 Rugby World Cup in New Zealand. Emilie Boulard started as France became the first team to reach the semi-finals with a 39–3 win over Italy. Boulard described the 25–24 defeat to New Zealand in the semi-final as “the worst defeat of my career and the most painful… The days following this semi-final were very difficult. There were regrets and guilt. We redid all our actions, saying to ourselves "if I had done such and such a thing, we could have made it to the final... When we see the final and our performance in the match for third place, we say to ourselves that there was room to win this title and be world champions. We didn't do it on this World Cup, we will do it on the next ones.”

In December 2022 Boulard made a try-scoring home debut for Blagnac in the Élite 1 competition against FC Grenoble at the Ernest-Argelès stadium. She was named in France's squad for the 2023 Women's Six Nations Championship.

She was called up to the side for the 2025 Six Nations Championship on 7 March. On 2 August, she was named in the French squad to the 2025 Women's Rugby World Cup.
