= Caroline Boujard =

French rugby union player

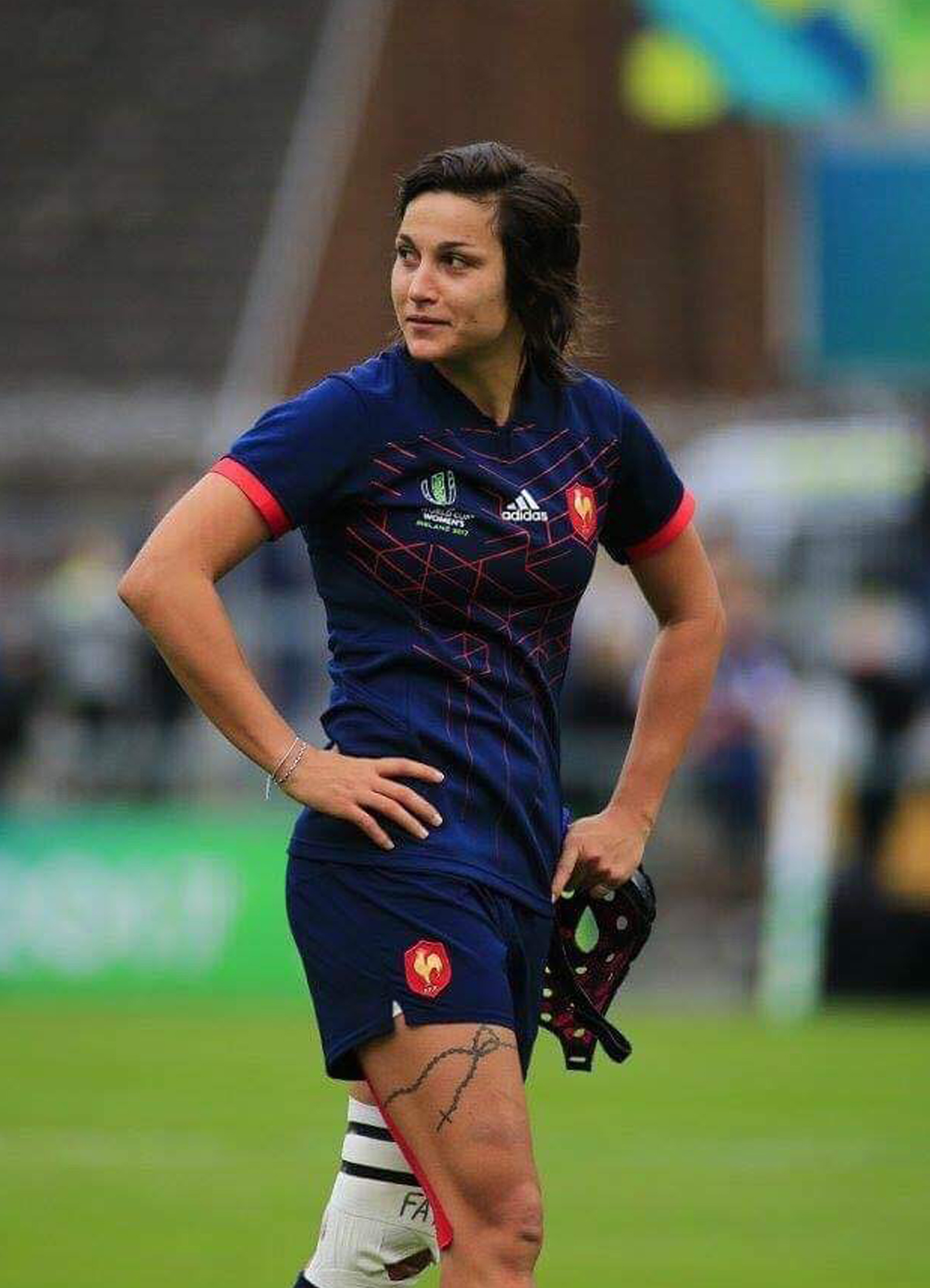
- Boujard with France in 2018
- Born: 6 January 1994 (age 32)
- Height: 1.73 m (5 ft 8 in)
- Weight: 67 kg (148 lb)

Rugby union career
- Position: Wing
Senior career
Years	Team	Apps	(Points)
2014–	Montpellier		(0)
International career
Years	Team	Apps	(Points)
2015–	France	26	(0)

Caroline Boujard (born 6 January 1994) is a French rugby union player for Montpellier. She played for France in the 2021 Women's Six Nations Championship, scoring a hat-trick in the opening match, against Wales.

Boujard was named in France's team for the delayed 2021 Rugby World Cup in New Zealand. She was selected in France's squad for the 2023 Women's Six Nations Championship.
