= Aseza Hele =

South African rugby union player

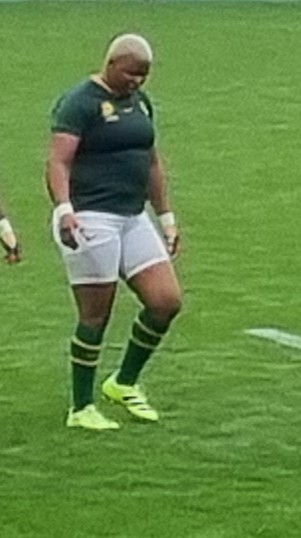
- Born: 26 November 1994 (age 31) Port Elizabeth, Eastern Cape, Republic of South Africa
- Height: 172 cm (5 ft 8 in)
- Weight: 88 kg (194 lb)

Rugby union career
- Position: Loose forward
Senior career
Years	Team	Apps	(Points)
- Boland Dames
International career
Years	Team	Apps	(Points)
2019–	South Africa	32	(85)
- Correct as of 14 September 2025

Aseza Hele (born 26 November 1994) is a South African international rugby union and rugby sevens player as a Number eight. She plays for Boland Dames.

== Biography ==
Aseza Hele was born on 26 November 1994. Orphaned, she and her sister were raised by her grandmother in the township of Kwadwesi, Port Elizabeth. She first played netball at a relatively high level, being selected with the Eastern Cape. But unfortunately, her work schedule prevents her from going to training sessions and she finds herself inactive in sport. She started playing rugby union by chance: one morning, she was jogging around a field where women were training. The coach called her to join the session and she accepted.

In 2022, she played for the Boland province. She had only five caps for South Africa when she was selected in September to play in the World Cup in New Zealand.

In July 2023, she signed with Harlequins, in the English Professional League. She was then selected to compete in the first edition of WXV 2, in South Africa. She received a red card against Italy, causing her to miss the last match against Samoa. At the end of the season, she returned to South Africa. In September, she was selected to play for the WXV.

In 2025, she played in the South African championship with the Boland Dames, of which she was captain. She was subsequently named in the Springbok Women's side to the 2025 Women's Rugby World Cup in England.
