= Madoussou Fall Raclot =

France international rugby union player

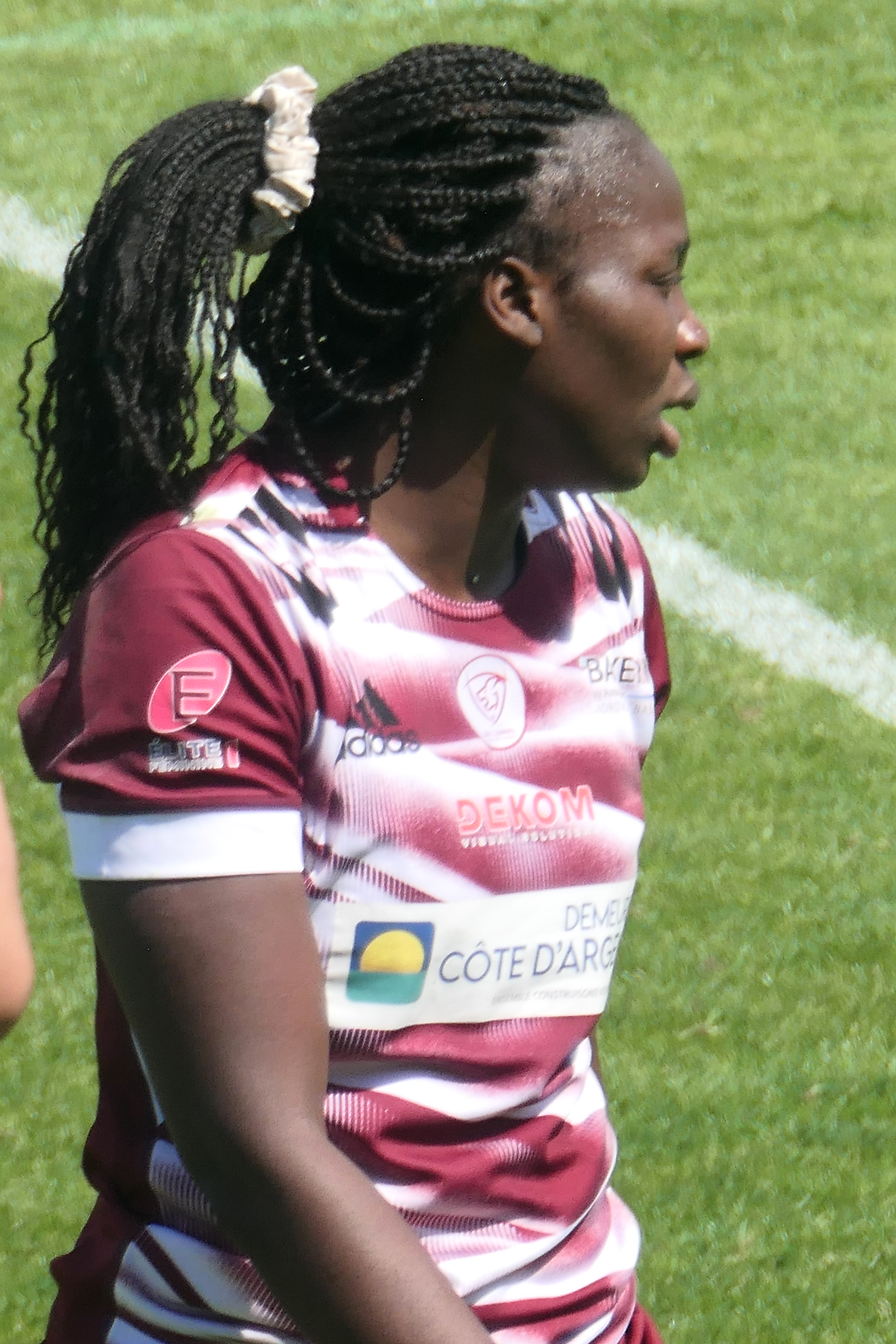
- Fall with Stade Bordelais in 2022
- Born: 17 March 1998 (age 28)
- Height: 187 cm (6 ft 2 in)

Rugby union career
- Position: Lock
Senior career
Years	Team	Apps	(Points)
2021–	Stade Bordelais		(0)
International career
Years	Team	Apps	(Points)
2019–	France	45	(30)

Madoussou Fall (born 17 March 1998) is a French rugby union player. She plays internationally for France and for Stade Bordelais in Élite 1. She competed for France in the delayed 2021 Rugby World Cup.

== Early life ==
The daughter of international basketball player Fatoumata Traoré, Fall had to choose between basketball and rugby and ultimately opted for rugby because she found it more enjoyable, even though her family was very basketball-orientated.

== Rugby career ==
In 2021, Fall left her club Bobigny, in Paris, to join Stade Bordelais and in her first season they reached the French play-offs for the first time in their history.

She has been described as France's "lethal weapon", and after overcoming an injury setback, by the Women's Six Nations Championship of 2022 she had established herself as a regular starter in the national side. She won player of the match for her performance in a French 39–6 win at the Stade des Alpes in Grenoble against Italy, being described as a "menace with the ball in hand". She was one of three players nominated for the award of “Best French international for the 2021–2022 season”, along with Laure Sansus, and Emilie Boulard, with the award ultimately going to Sansus.

Fall was named in France's squad for the delayed 2021 Rugby World Cup in New Zealand.

She played in the 2025 Women's Six Nations Championship, having been named in the national side on 7 March. In August, she was selected in the squad to the Women's Rugby World Cup in England.
