= Zenay Jordaan =

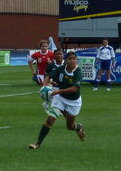
- 2010 Women's Rugby World Cup in Surrey
- Born: 4 April 1991 (age 35) Eastern Cape, South Africa
- Height: 1.56 m (5 ft 1 1/2 in)
- Weight: 66 kg (146 lb; 10 st 6 lb)

Rugby union career
- Position: Fly Half
Senior career
Years	Team	Apps	(Points)
- EP Queens
International career
Years	Team	Apps	(Points)
2008–2022	South Africa	36	(98)
National sevens team
Years	Team		Comps
- South Africa
Coaching career
- Years: Team
- 2024–2026: Bulls Daisies (assistant coach)
- 2026–: Bulls Daisies (head coach)

Zenay Jordaan (born 31 April 1991) is a South African rugby union player. She plays for EP Queens and the South Africa women's national rugby union team.

== Rugby career ==
In 2009, she made her international debut in both sevens and 15s, and five years later she was part of the first group of South African women to be awarded professional contracts.

In 2013 she was named Springbok Women's Player of the Year, and in 2022 she became South Africa's most capped player. At that time, she also announced her plans to retire after the 2021 World Cup.
