= Laure Touyé =

French rugby player (born 1996)

- Born: 12 May 1996 (age 30)

Rugby union career
- Position: Hooker
International career
Years	Team	Apps	(Points)
2016-	France		

Laure Touyé (born 12 May 1996) is a French rugby union player who plays for Montpellier and the France women's national rugby union team.

== Career ==
Although she started training as a Judoka and had not played rugby before the age of eighteen, Touyé stated that she grew to prefer the team sport nature of rugby, first for Blagnac SCR and then from 2019, Montpellier. She made her full France debut in November 2016 against the USA. In November 2018, Touyé was among the first 24 French rugby union players to sign a part-time federal contract. She was named in France's team for the delayed 2021 Rugby World Cup in New Zealand. On 29 October 2022 Touyé scored a second half try as France became the first team to reach the semi-finals with a 39-3 win over Italy.
