= Connie Powell =

England international rugby union player

- Born: Connie Nic Powell; 13 July 2000 (age 26) Ipswich
- Height: 165 cm (5 ft 5 in)
- Weight: 88 kg (194 lb; 13 st 12 lb)
- School: Hadleigh High School

Rugby union career
- Position: Hooker
- Current team: Harlequins
Youth career
- 2014–2016: Sudbury
Senior career
Years	Team	Apps	(Points)
2016–	Gloucester-Hartpury		
2023−	Harlequins		
International career
Years	Team	Apps	(Points)
2017–2020	England U20		
2021–	England	19	(30)
Medal record
Representing England
Women's rugby union
Rugby World Cup
Silver medal – second place	2021 New Zealand	Team competition

Connie Nic Powell (born 13 July 2000) is an English rugby union player. She is a member of the England women's national rugby union team and plays for Harlequins in the Premier 15s.

== International career ==
After progressing through the England U18 Talent Development Group, Powell was named in the U20 squads in 2017–18, 2018–19, and 2019–20. She made her full England debut off the bench against the US in November 2021.

In September 2022 Powell was named in the England squad for the COVID-delayed 2021 Rugby World Cup.

== Club career ==
In 2016 Powell moved to Gloucestershire to study for a BTEC at Hartpury College and began playing for Gloucester-Hartpury.

== Early life and education ==
Powell grew up in Suffolk where she played for Sudbury RUFC and Eastern Counties.
