= Laure Sansus =

French rugby union player (born 1994)

- Born: 21 June 1994 (age 32)
- Height: 1.57 m (5 ft 2 in)

Rugby union career
- Position: Scrumhalf
Senior career
Years	Team	Apps	(Points)
2014–2022	Toulouse		(0)
International career
Years	Team	Apps	(Points)
2016–2022	France	30	(0)

Laure Bourdon Sansus (née Sansus, born 21 June 1994) is a former French rugby union player.

== Rugby career ==
Laure Sansus was born on 21 June 1994 in Lauragais.

Originally from Toutens, she first played rugby in Labastide-Beauvoir. She then joined the Saint-Orens women's rugby club which is located in Saint-Orens-de-Gameville, southeast of Toulouse before being recruited by the Avenir Fonsorbais women's rugby team, which then became Stade Toulousain.

=== Makes her international debut ===
On 6 February 2016, in Bourg-en-Bresse, she made her international debut as a substitute scrum-half in France’s 39-0 defeat of Italy.

Due to financial reasons, she put her rugby career on hold, missing the 2017-2018 season while she worked full time. Eventually she obtained a position in 2018 working in the shop at Stade Toulousain which allowed her to return to the rugby field to play with Stade Toulousain for the 2018-19 season. That season, she made her first appearance in the French women's rugby championship, as Stade toulousain lost 22-13 to Stade Maurice-Trélut. On 18 May 2019, she played for Stade Toulousain at the Stade Maurice-Trélut in Tarbes in the final of the French championship, against Montpellier. The Toulousaines lost 22-13.

Part way through 2021 she decided she would retire after the upcoming 2021 Rugby World Cup in New Zealand but after it was postponed by a year due to the Covid-19 pandemic she decided to continue playing for another year. In 2021 she was nominated for the that year's World Rugby Player of the Year, but missed out on the honour.

On 15 May 2022, she officially announced that she would retire from the sport at the end of the 2022 season. In June 2022, she was crowned French champion with Stade Toulousain – a first for the club on the women's side– before being named best French international at the end of September. She was voted best player of the 2022 Six Nations Championship, and with six tries finished the tournament as the top scorer.

=== 2021 Women’s Rugby World Cup ===
In September, she was selected by coach Thomas Darracq to play in the postponed World Cup. Following her selection, she explained that she wanted to "make the most of" her last weeks as a French XV player before devoting herself to her family. She scored two tries in the team’s opening match on 8 October against South Africa, which the French won 40-5. During the first half of France's 13-7 pool-stage defeat by England, in what was the team’s second match of the competition, she suffered a ruptured anterior cruciate ligament in one of her knees. Pauline Bourdon replaced her on the field. This not only led to her withdrawal from the competition but bought forward the end of her playing career after 23 years

=== Coaching ===
On 26 March 2023, she joined Stade Toulousain as a coach with Céline Ferer. She also heads the club's development centre, which was launched in April 2023.

== Personal life ==
After announcing their engagement in 2021 she married fellow rugby player Pauline Bourdon in August 2023. A complication to their relationship prior to Sansus' retirement from the game that both of them completed for the same position as scrum halves on the French national team. On 29 July 2025 Sansus gave birth to their son Arthur.
