= Ellie Kildunne =

England international dual code rugby player (born 1999)

Ellie Kildunne MBE
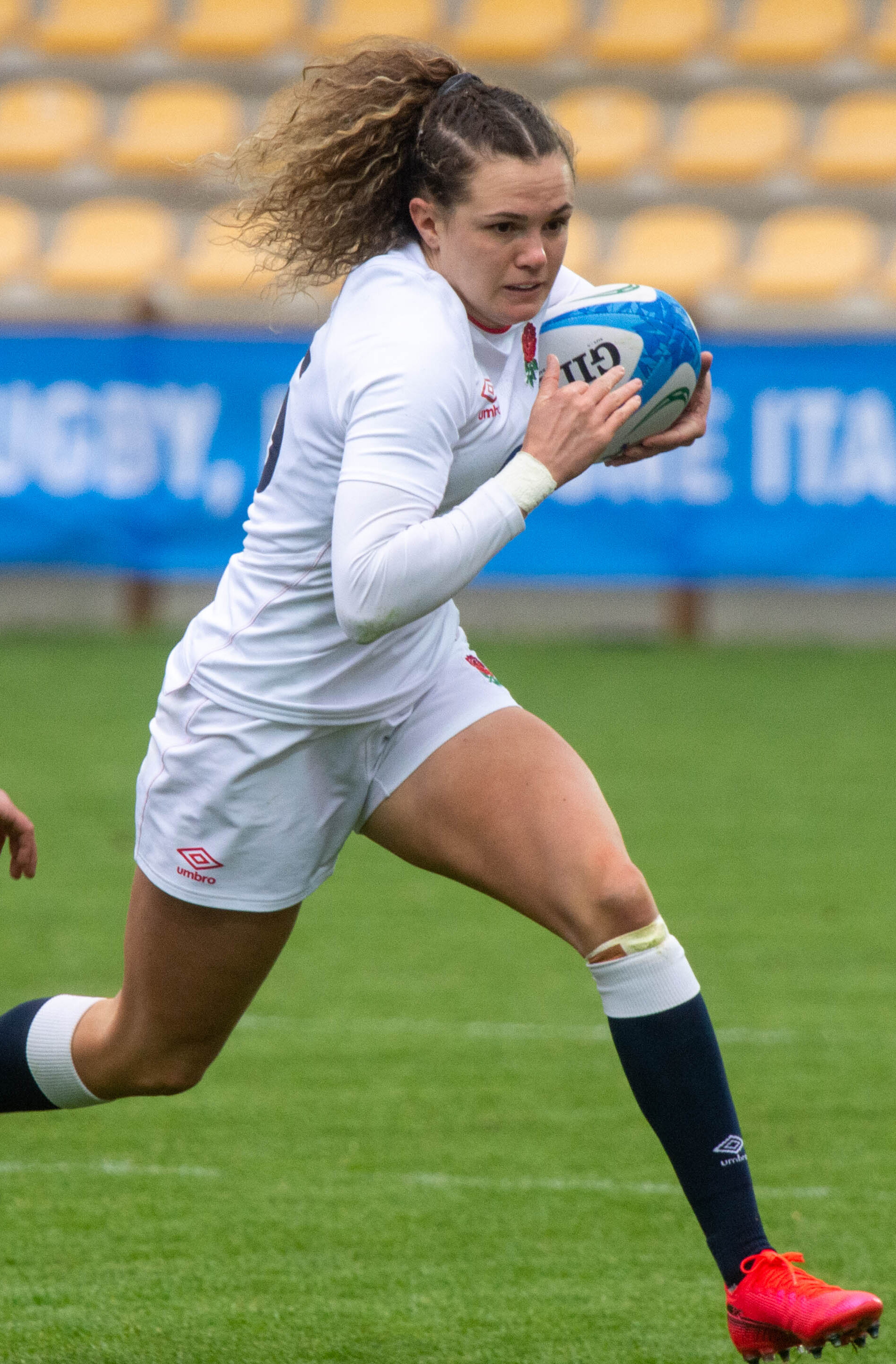
- Kildunne with England in 2021
- Full name: Ellie Tea Kildunne
- Born: 8 September 1999 (age 27) Keighley, West Yorkshire, England
- Height: 1.76 m (5 ft 9 in)
- Weight: 68 kg (150 lb)

Rugby union career
- Position: Centre / Fullback
- Current team: Bristol Bears
Senior career
Years	Team	Apps	(Points)
2017–2018	Gloucester-Hartpury		(0)
2020−2021	Wasps		(0)
2021−2026	Harlequins	60	(0)
2026–	Bristol Bears		
International career
Years	Team	Apps	(Points)
2017–	England	62	(260)
National sevens teams
Years	Team		Comps
2018–2020	England		
2024–	Great Britain		
Medal record
Women's rugby union
Representing England
Rugby World Cup
Gold medal – first place	2025 England	Team competition
Silver medal – second place	2021 New Zealand	Team competition

Ellie Tea Kildunne MBE (born 8 September 1999) is an English rugby player. She is a member of the Red Roses and Bristol Bears of Premiership Women's Rugby at the club level, while also playing sevens in the past. Kildunne was the recipient of the World Rugby Women's 15s Player of the Year at the 2024 World Rugby Awards. She was a 2025 World Cup winner, scoring the opening try in the final for England, and was voted runner-up for the 2025 BBC Sports Personality of the Year Award.

== Early life and education ==
Kildunne grew up in West Yorkshire and started playing rugby aged seven. She played rugby league for Keighley Albion as well as rugby union for Keighley RUFC, where she was the only girl on the pitch. At Under-18 level, Kildunne captained the Yorkshire team and represented the England Under-18 side at sevens. She attended Woodhouse Grove School, a private, day and boarding school in Yorkshire, where she was also a keen footballer, but went down the rugby route when she enrolled at Hartpury College after finishing school.

Kildunne studied Sport and Exercise Science at St Mary's University, Twickenham on a scholarship. In 2026, she was awarded an Honorary Doctorate in Sport by the university in recognition of her outstanding contribution to English rugby.

== Club career ==
Kildunne began playing rugby league for Keighley Albion and Rugby Union for Keighley RUFC before moving on to West Park, Leeds, and then Castleford. She joined Premier 15s team Gloucester-Hartpury for the 2017–18 season.

Kildunne joined Wasps Women in 2020 and committed her immediate future to XVs rugby. A move to Harlequins Women followed in 2021. Kildunne made her fiftieth appearance for Harlequins on 2 November 2025. In June 2026, it was announced that Kildunne would be leaving Harlequins after five seasons to join Bristol Bears.

== International career ==
Kildunne scoring a try in the 2025 World Cup final against Canada

Kildunne's England debut came in 2017, when she scored a try for the England 15s in a match against Canada.

After an impressive performance in the Tyrrells Premier 15s, she was called up to start five of England's 2018 Women's Six Nations Championship matches. She was named Player of the Match after England's win over Ireland, and also in the Six Nations after England's 46–0 win over Scotland on 13 April 2024.

In the summer of 2018, Kildunne transitioned to England Women's Sevens team as it fought to—and did—qualify for the 2020 Summer Olympics.

Kildunne made her return to XVs rugby but missed the first two events of the 2019 World Series due to injury. She went on to play eight of England's matches of the competition and scored three tries for her country.

She was part of the team that won the 2020 Women's Six Nations Championship, which was postponed until late 2020 due to the COVID-19 pandemic. She also played in the 2021 Women's Six Nations Championships, which England won. She was named in the England squad for the delayed 2021 Rugby World Cup held in New Zealand in October and November 2022, and played in the final which England lost to New Zealand to finish as tournament runners-up.

After winning the 2024 Six Nations grand slam, in which she was the top try scorer, it was announced that she would join up with the Great Britain women's sevens team prior to the 2024 Summer Olympics. In June 2024, she was named in the British squad for the Olympic Games. The team finished seventh.

In November 2024, she was named World Rugby Women's 15s Player of the Year at the World Rugby Awards. She was called into the Red Roses side for the 2025 Six Nations Championship in March. On 29 March 2025 she was named Player of the Match in a 67–12 win over Wales in the Women's Six Nations. In July 2025, she was named in the England squad for the 2025 Rugby World Cup. Having scored two tries in England's semi final victory over France, on 27 September, Kildunne played in her second consecutive World Cup final, and scored the opening try for England as they beat Canada 33–13 at Twickenham to become world champions.

During the 2026 Six Nations Championship Kildunne scored her fiftieth international try in an 84–7 win against Scotland on 18 April. In May 2026, she scored two tries against France in the Six Nations Championship as England extended their unbeaten run to 38 matches and won a fifth consecutive grand slam in the event. On June 19, it was announced that Kildunne would be joining Bristol Bears for the 2026-27 PWR season.

== Personal life ==
Her brother Sam Kildunne is also an England Rugby Sevens international player.

Kildunne was nominated for the 2025 BBC Sports Personality of the Year, finishing as runner-up to golfer Rory McIlroy in the public vote. That month, she was awarded an MBE in the 2026 New Year Honours.

== Honours ==
England

- Women's Rugby World Cup
  - (gold) Champion (1): 2025
