= Pauline Bourdon Sansus =

French rugby union player (born 1995)

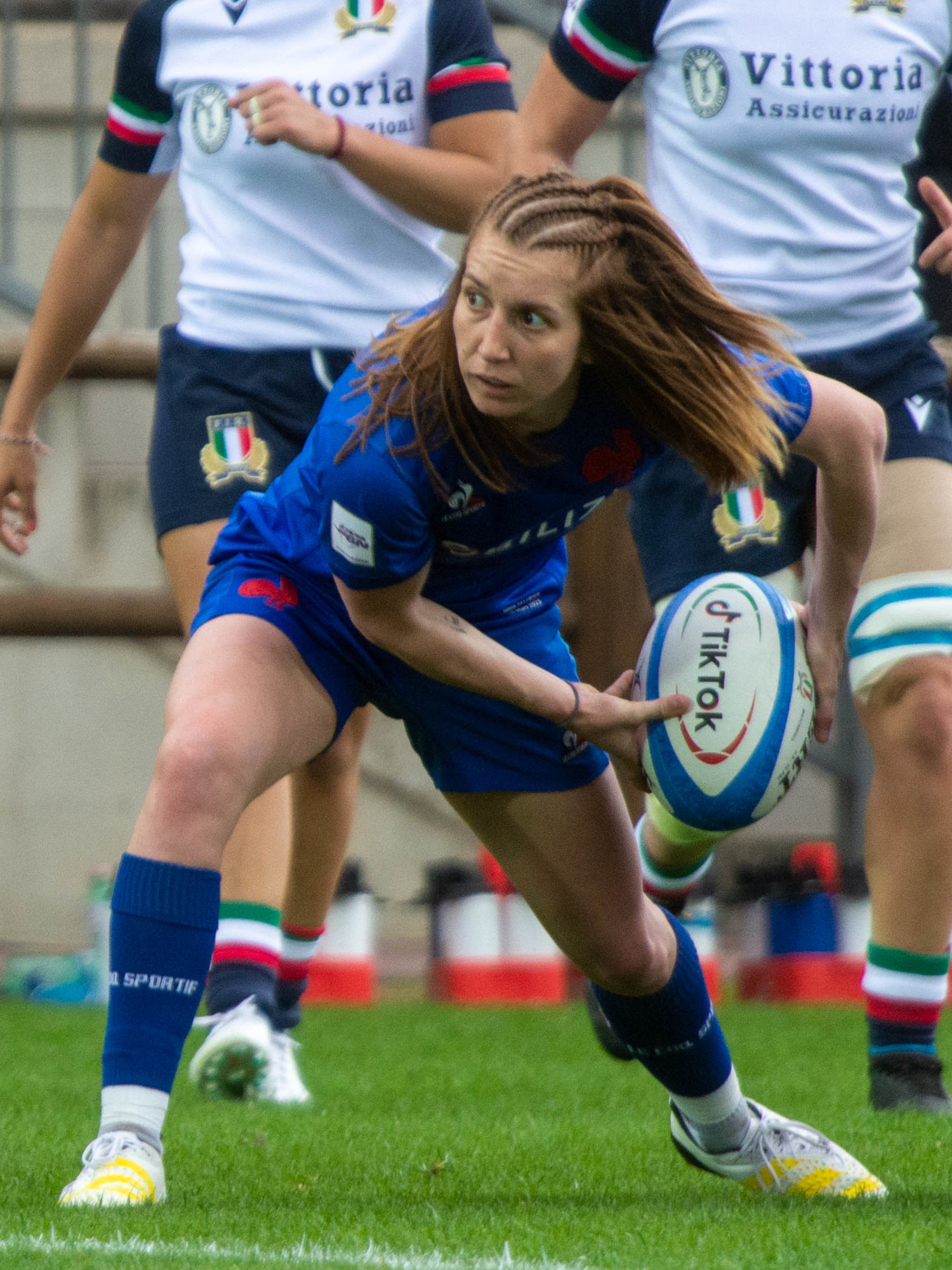
- Bourdon with France in 2023
- Born: Pauline Bourdon; 4 November 1995 (age 31) Limoges, France
- Height: 1.65 m (5 ft 5 in)

Rugby union career
- Position: Scrumhalf
- Current team: Toulouse
Senior career
Years	Team	Apps	(Points)
2021–	Toulouse		(0)
International career
Years	Team	Apps	(Points)
2015–Present	France	77	(149)

Pauline Bourdon Sansus (née Bourdon, born 4 November 1995) is a French rugby union player. She competed at the 2021 Rugby World Cup.

== Rugby career ==
She was born on 4 November 1995 in Limoges.

She discovered rugby at the age of four at the Beaublanc Stadium. At the age of five she gave up football to play rugby at Capo Limoges Omnisports, the city's multi-sports club, before moving to USA Limoges, the city's largest rugby club. She was educated at the Vaseix agricultural high school (Lycée agricole de Limoges Les Vaseix), where she was a member of their team that won the French agricultural high school national rugby tournament.

In 2013 at the age of 18, she moved to AS Bayonne, joining what was her first senior team, and where she remained until 2021. During her time with AS Bayonne she was a member of their women's team that won the French Elite 2 competition in 2014 and again in 2017. To support herself she found employment as a cooking workshop instructor at the établissement et service d'aide par le travail (ESAT) which is an institution for disabled people in Arbonne. At Bayonne, she demonstrated particular talent as a versatile player, playing in her preferred position of scrum-half, but also as a fly-half, winger and fullback.

=== International debut ===
After only two senior seasons, and just a few days after her twentieth birthday, she made her international debut on 7 November 2015 for the French national team in their 11-0 victory over England at Stade Francis-Turcan in Martigues.

On 18 March 2016 in Vannes, she started the last match of the Six Nations Championship against England, which France won 17-12 to win the championship. During France's summer tour, she came on as a substitute and scored a try in her team's 19-13 victory over the United States in Salt Lake City. She again came on as a substitute in the opening game against Canada, which France lost 10-29. In November in Béziers, she started behind the scrum in France's 36-10 victory over the United States.

In 2017, she faced a difficult career decision. Her employer offered her a permanent position which she accepted. As she felt she had to limit the amount of time she could be absent from work she didn’t undertake any international commitments, thus missing the Six Nations Championship and the 2017 World Cup. In the same year, she won the Élite 2 again with AS Bayonne, which resulted in the team being promoted to the top division, the Top 8. Her performances saw her recalled to the national team for the autumn tour. She was a starter against Spain and made three conversions and a starter at fly-half against Italy, scoring one penalty and one conversion.

=== 2018 Six Nations Grand Slam ===
At the 2018 Six Nations, she started in all five matches, the first two as fly-half and the last three as a scrum-half. In the first match against Ireland on 3 February which France won 24-0 she was named Player of the Match. In the third match, against Italy on 24 February 2018, which France won 57-0, she scored her debut international try. In the final match of the competition which was against Wales on 16 March at the Eirias Stadium in Colwyn Bay she scored a try as part of her contribution to France's 38-3 victory. She was again named Player of the Match. France won the championship with a Grand Slam. Sports journalist Justine Saint-Sevin subsequently commented on Bourdon Sanus's influence: "She is perhaps the player who has most revolutionized the national team's game." Previously, the team had lacked variety. Bourdon Sansus was "very confident with her feet; this changed everything. Powerful kicks, millimetre-precise passes to her wingers, precise clearances after kickoffs. Pauline Bourdon could do it all. This versatility allowed the French team to make a real leap forward in development."

On 17 November 2018 at the Stade des Alpes in Grenoble, Bourdon Sansus was a member of the French team that achieved their first official victory against the New Zealand women's team, defeating the reigning world champions 30-27. She started the game at scrum-half, but was switched to fly-half during the game. At the end of the year, she was nominated by World Rugby as the best 15s player of the year, but it was another Frenchwoman, Jessy Trémoulière, who won the award. Shortly thereafter, she was one of the first 24 players to sign a part-time contract with the French Rugby Federation. this allowed her to leave her job in November of that year. Her contract was extended in August 2019 for the 2019-2020 season.

Aft the conclusion of the first match of the 2019 Women's Six Nations Championship at the GGL Stadium in Montpellier on 2 February 2019, which saw France victorious against Wales, 52-3, she was named player of the match. Playing against England on 10 February she started the match behind the scrum, before moving to the fly-half and despite contributing two tries and two conversions France lost 41-26. Against Scotland on 23 February in Villeneuve d'Ascq she scored a try and made three conversions to contribute to her team's 41-10 victory. During the fourth match of the championship against Ireland in Dublin on 9 March which the French won 47-17, she started at fly-half and was then repositioned to scrum-half during the second half, a move which also occurred during the last match of the championship at the Stadio Plebiscito in Padua, Italy on 17 March, which France lost 31-12. With 25 points from three tries and five conversions she finished the Six Nations Championship with the third highest score.

In the 2021 Women's Six Nations Championship, she scored thirteen points for France against Wales in their 53–0 win.

In 2021, in order to settle down with her wife Laure Sansus, she moved from AS Bayonne to Stade Toulousain.

=== 2021 Women’s Rugby World Cup ===
Injury forced her to miss the 2022 Six Nations Championship which allowed her wife Laure Sansus to stake a claims as the preferred scrum-half in the French team.

Both she and Laure Sansus were members of France's squad for the delayed 2021 Rugby World Cup in New Zealand. She played in the matches against England, Fiji, Italy, New Zealand and Canada. Her moment of glory came in the third-place play-off against Canada, in which she scored a try to contribute to France's 36-0 victory which secured them third place.

She returned to New Zealand in 2023 as one of the 30 players in the French team that contested the inaugural WXV 1 tournament which was held there between 21 October and 4 November. Bourdon Sansus scored a try in their match against Canada. The only French win was against New Zealand.

In the 2023 Six Nations, Bourdon Sansus was named Player of the Match for her two tries in France’s epic 53-3 victory over Ireland. She also crossed the line at the inaugural WXV tournament. As a result, she was named in the World Rugby Women's 15s Dream Team of the Year and repeated the accomplishment in 2024.

She played in eight of France's nine matches in 2024.

=== 2025 Women's Six Nations Championship ===
She was a member of the French team for the 2025 Women's Six Nations Championship which was announced on 7 March.

On 22 March 2025 in La Rochelle, during the third match of the Tournament she scored a 35 metre drop goal against Scotland. It was the first drop goal in 11 years in the Six Nations and only the eighth in its entire history.

=== 2025 Women’s Rugby World Cup ===
On 2 August 2025 it was announced that she had been selected to be a member of the French team to participate in the Women's Rugby World Cup in England.

Following post-match remarks about refereeing after the Elite 1 final lost by her club, Stade Toulousain, to Stade Bordelais she was suspended for two matches. This caused her to miss both France’s warm-up match on 9 August against England in Mont-de-Marsan and the team’s first world cup game, which was against Italy on 23 August. She debuted at the tournament in France’s 84-5 defeat of Brazil, during which she scored a try. In her second match of the tournament which resulted in the French scoring a 57-10 victory over South Africa at Franklin’s Gardens in pool play, her contribution was acknowlegded with her receiving her second consecutive player of the match award.

=== 2026 Women's Six Nations Championship ===
She played for France in five games during the 2026 Women's Six Nations Championship competition. She ended the competition withed three tries, with the most six try assists (6), a 97% pass accuracy rate and carried further (255 metres) than any other scrum-half in the competition. She was nominated for Guinness Player of the Championship, losing to Aoife Wafer.

She was appointed captain of the French team for the 2026 WXV Global Series WXV1 competition, replacing Manae Feleu, who was unavailable for two months while she focused on her medicine studies.

== Personal life ==
After announcing their engagement in 2021 she married fellow rugby player Laure Sansus in August 2023. A complication to their relationship prior to Sansus' retirement from the game was that both of them competed for the same position as scrum halves on the French national team. On 29 July 2025 Sansus gave birth to their son Arthur.

She appeared in the 2024 short film Notre Diversité, Notre Force (Our Diversity, Our Strength), which addresses the subject of homosexuality in rugby.

== Awards and honours ==
- Olympic Midi Oscars: best French player 2019.
- Rugby Night 2019: Best French International.
- World Rugby Awards: Member of the Women's XV of the Year in 2023.
