= Abby Dow =

England international rugby union player (born 1997)

- Dow with England in 2021
- Full name: Abigail Dow
- Born: 29 September 1997 (age 29) Slough, England
- Height: 1.68 m (5 ft 6 in)
- Weight: 72 kg (159 lb)

Rugby union career
- Position: Wing
Senior career
Years	Team	Apps	(Points)
2017–2022	Wasps		
2022–2023	Harlequins		
2023–2025	Ealing Trailfinders		
International career
Years	Team	Apps	(Points)
2016–2017	England U20s		
2017–2025	England	59	(250)
National sevens team
Years	Team		Comps
2015–2016	England U18s		
Medal record
Women's rugby union
Representing England
Rugby World Cup
Gold medal – first place	2025 England	Team competition
Silver medal – second place	2021 New Zealand	Team competition

Abigail Dow (born 29 September 1997, Slough) is an English former rugby player. She was a member of the England women's national rugby team and was a winner of the 2025 Women's Rugby World Cup. In November 2023, she was nominated for the World Rugby Women's 15s Player of the Year.

== International career ==
Dow made her England debut in the 2017 Old Mutual Wealth Series against Canada women's national rugby union team, where she scored five tries in her first two appearances.

During the 2018 Women's Six Nations Championship, she started three of England's matches and scored three tries. England finished in second place.

She featured once during the 2019 Women's Six Nations Championship, scoring a try as England defeated Wales. England went on to win the grand slam.

She played again for England in the 2020 Women's Six Nations Championship, scoring four tries in three matches and becoming a Grand Slam winner for the second time. In 2020, she was awarded a professional contract with the England Women's rugby team.

In February 2021 she was considered England's first choice full back. She missed the first match of the 2021 Women's Six Nations Championship due to a family bereavement, but returned for England's 67–3 win over Italy where she scored two of England's nine tries. England won the championship outright, with Dow scoring ten points for the team across the course of the tournament. She was named in the England squad for the delayed 2021 Rugby World Cup held in New Zealand in October and November 2022. She suffered a head injury in the final, due to a high tackle.

Playing in the Six Nations in 2023, Dow scored four tries against Italy. On 17 March 2025, she was called into the Red Roses side for the Six Nations Championship. The following month, she won her fiftieth cap for England in the match against Ireland in the championship. Her performances led her to Dow being named in the Team of the Championship and nominated for the overall Player of the Championship award alongside Ireland forward Aoife Wafer, France second-row Manaé Feleu, and Scotland back-row Evie Gallagher.

In July 2025, she was named in the England squad for the ultimately victorious 2025 Rugby World Cup campaign. In November 2025, Dow announced her retirement from professional rugby, having won 59 caps for England and scored 50 tries.

== Club career ==
In 2016, Dow joined Wasps Ladies, where she played as a right wing. She was given a professional contract with the club in 2020.

Following the Rugby World Cup 2021, Dow joined Harlequins for the 2022–23 season of the Allianz Premier 15s.

In May 2023, Dow was announced as the first signing for Trailfinders Women for their maiden season in the Allianz Premier 15s (2023–24). In June 2025 her departure from Trailfinders was announced.

== Early life and education ==
Dow started playing rugby at about five years old. Her dad, Paul Dow, coached at Maidenhead Rugby club so she started out there, later moving to Reading to play for the girls' team. Her sister, Ruth, also played for Reading. Both sisters were chosen for the England South West Women's rugby sevens side. Ruth played flanker and played in the Premiership for Wasps and for England U20s before a temporary injury interruption.

Dow's brother, Chris Dow, also played for Maidenhead.

In January 2021, Dow completed a master's degree in Mechanical Engineering at Imperial College London, where she achieved first class honours.

She was a swimmer until the age of 16 when she decided to focus on rugby.

== Honours ==
England

- Women's Rugby World Cup
  - (gold) Champion (1): 2025
