= France women's national rugby union team =

France
- Union: French Rugby Federation
- Head coach: François Ratier
- Captain: Manaé Feleu
First colours	Second colours

World Rugby ranking
- Current: 4 (as of 2 October 2025)
- Highest: 2 (2005–2006, 2015–2016)
- Lowest: 6 (2008–2009)

First international
- Netherlands 0–4 France (Utrecht, Netherlands; 13 June 1982)

Biggest win
- France 99–0 Japan (Edinburgh, Scotland; 17 April 1994)

Biggest defeat
- France 0–109 New Zealand (Edmonton, Canada; 14 September 1996)

World Cup
- Appearances: 9 (First in 1991)
- Best result: 3rd place (1991, 1994, 2002, 2006, 2014, 2017 and 2021)

The France women's national rugby union team represents France in women's international rugby union. The France team, and the Netherlands, played the first-ever women's rugby union test match on 13 June 1982. They compete annually in the Women's Six Nations Championship and have placed third in seven of nine Rugby World Cups.

== History ==
Source: "Des Filles en Ovalie", Éditions Atlantica (2005), Written by Jacques Corte / Yaneth Pinilla B. Foreword by Serge Betsen.

There are records of women's rugby being played in France as early as the mid-1890s, and in the 1920s a form of the game called "barette" was very popular, with national championships. However, after the 1930s the game had all but disappeared and was not revived until 1965 when groups of students in Lyon and Toulouse decided to take part in the great charitable campaign against world hunger. Most of them had brothers and friends who played rugby, so they decided to organise a charity game at Bourg-en-Bresse.

So successful was this that a regular series of games began, with clubs being formed as students graduated, initially mainly in the south. In 1969 a national association – the ARF [Women's Rugby Association] – was formed. Despite initial opposition to the game from both the government and the FFR (who briefly banned any FFR officials from officiating at women's games) by 1976 12 clubs were taking part in national competitions.

In 1982, by which time the number of clubs had more than doubled, the ARF signed a memorandum of understanding was agreed with the FFR which finally gave their official backing – and in the same year France took part in the first ever women's rugby international.

French squad during the 2014 Six Nations

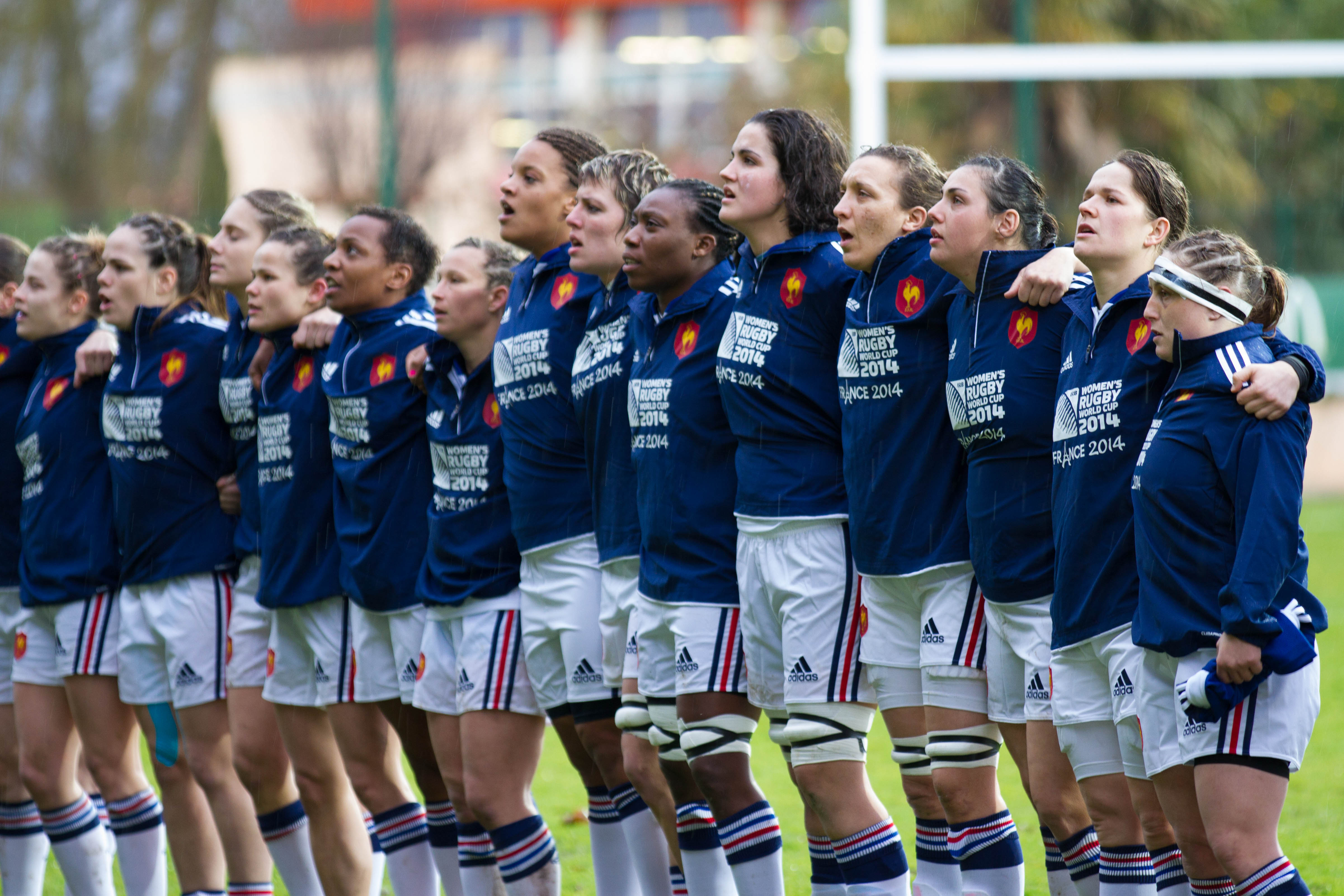

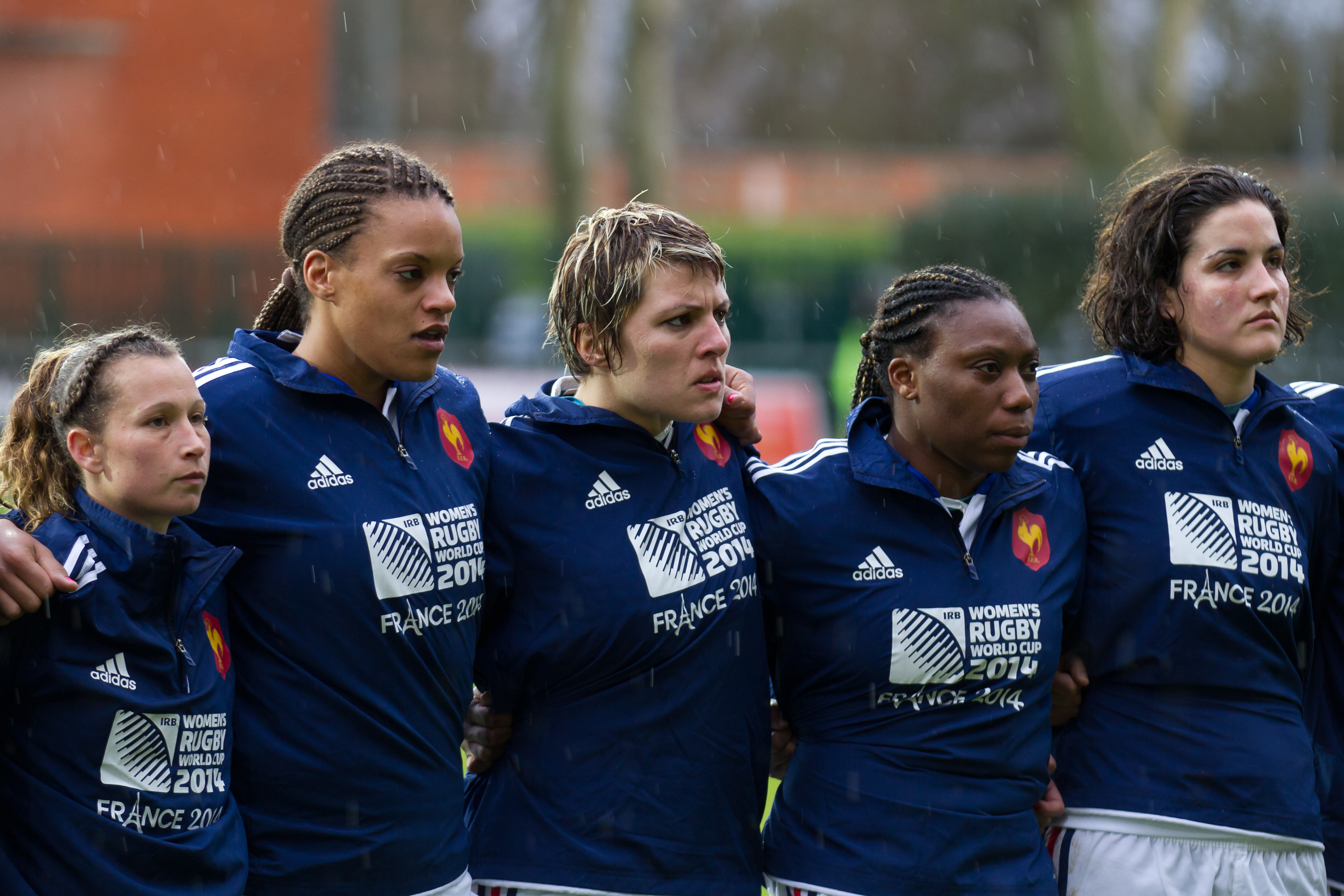

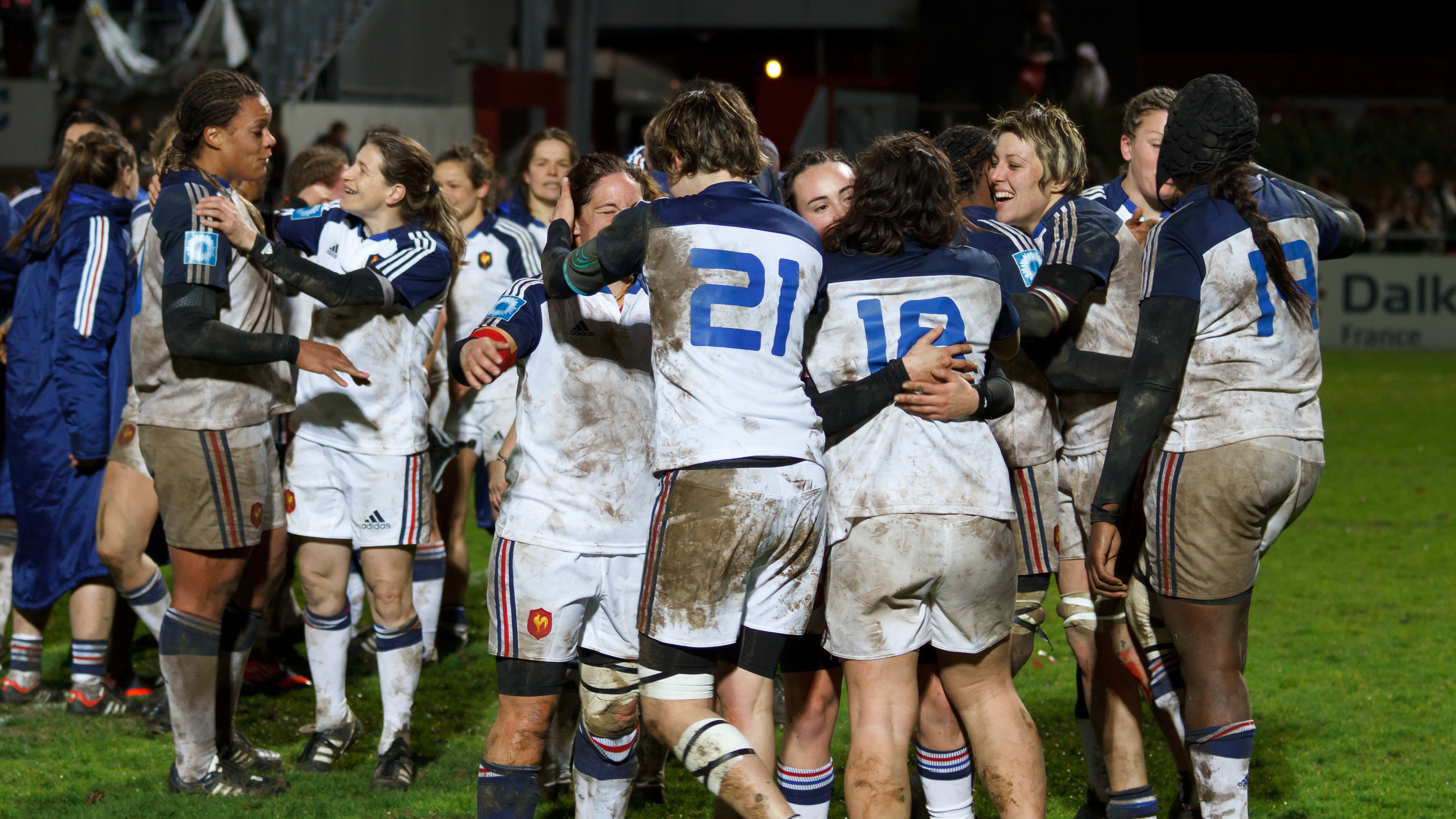

Since 2002, France has won six Women's Six Nations titles and are the next most successful team in the competition after England.

== Players ==
=== Current squad ===
France announced their 32 player squad on 2 August for the 2025 Women's Rugby World Cup.

Note: The age and number of caps listed for each player is as of 22 August 2025, the first day of the tournament.

Player	Position	Date of birth (age)	Caps	Club/province
Manon Bigot	Hooker	6 June 1990 (aged 35)	14	(France) Blagnac SCR
Agathe Gérin	Hooker	21 May 1995 (aged 30)	57	(France) Stade Bordelais
Élisa Riffonneau	Hooker	26 November 2003 (aged 21)	17	(France) FC Grenoble Amazones
Makarita Baleinadogo	Prop	9 February 2002 (aged 23)	0	(France) Stade Bordelais
Rose Bernadou	Prop	27 March 2000 (aged 25)	21	(France) Montpellier HR
Yllana Brosseau	Prop	5 September 2000 (aged 24)	22	(France) Stade Bordelais
Annaëlle Deshayes	Prop	16 March 1996 (aged 29)	49	(France) Stade Bordelais
Assia Khalfaoui	Prop	24 March 2001 (aged 24)	31	(France) Stade Bordelais
Madoussou Fall	Second row	17 March 1998 (aged 27)	40	(France) Stade Bordelais
Manaé Feleu	Second row	3 February 2000 (aged 25)	27	(France) FC Grenoble Amazones
Hina Ikahehegi	Second row	29 April 2003 (aged 22)	4	(France) Stade Villeneuvois LM
Axelle Berthoumieu	Back row	9 July 2000 (aged 25)	22	(France) Blagnac SCR
Léa Champon	Back row	25 February 2003 (aged 22)	9	(France) FC Grenoble Amazones
Khoudedia Cissokho	Back row	22 June 1999 (aged 26)	1	(France) Stade Bordelais
Charlotte Escudero	Back row	26 December 2000 (aged 24)	27	(France) Stade Toulousain
Teani Feleu	Back row	19 December 2002 (aged 22)	12	(France) FC Grenoble Amazones
Taïna Maka	Back row	22 December 2004 (aged 20)	2	(France) FC Grenoble Amazones
Marie Morland	Back row	5 October 2005 (aged 19)	0	(France) Lyon OU
Séraphine Okemba	Back row	3 December 1995 (aged 29)	8	(France) Lyon OU
Pauline Bourdon Sansus	Scrum-half	4 November 1995 (aged 29)	66	(France) Stade Toulousain
Alexandra Chambon	Scrum-half	2 August 2000 (aged 25)	30	(France) FC Grenoble Amazones
Carla Neisen	Scrum-half	8 March 1996 (aged 29)	27	(France) Blagnac SCR
Carla Arbez	Fly-half	24 May 1999 (aged 26)	13	(France) Stade Bordelais
Lina Queyroi	Fly-half	18 May 2001 (aged 24)	23	(France) Stade Toulousain
Lina Tuy	Fly-half	10 September 2004 (aged 20)	8	(France) ASM Romagnat
Nassira Konde	Centre	30 July 1999 (aged 26)	15	(France) Stade Bordelais
Gaby Vernier	Centre	2 June 1997 (aged 28)	52	(France) Blagnac SCR
Kelly Arbey	Wing	9 May 2005 (aged 20)	6	(France) Stade Toulousain
Joanna Grisez	Wing	5 October 1996 (aged 28)	9	(France) Stade Bordelais
Marine Ménager	Wing	26 July 1996 (aged 29)	58	(France) Montpellier HR
Émilie Boulard	Fullback	23 August 1999 (aged 25)	36	(France) Blagnac SCR
Morgane Bourgeois	Fullback	6 February 2003 (aged 22)	14	(France) Stade Bordelais

=== Notable players ===
- Nathalie Amiel was inducted into the IRB Hall of Fame on 17 November 2014. She made her international debut at 15 against Great Britain in London in 1986. She went on to win 56 caps for France by the time she retired in 2002. She played at three Women's Rugby World Cups in 1991, 1994 and 2002.

=== Award winners ===
==== World Rugby Awards ====
The following France players have been recognised at the World Rugby Awards since 2001:

World Rugby Women's 15s Player of the Year
Year	Nominees	Winners
2006	Delphine Plantet	—
2014	Safi N'Diaye	—
2015	Gaëlle Mignot	—
2016	Gaëlle Mignot (2)	—
2018	Jessy Trémoulière	Jessy Trémoulière
2019	Pauline Bourdon	—
2021	Caroline Boujard	—
2021	Laure Sansus	—
2022	Laure Sansus (2)	—
2023	Gabrielle Vernier	—
2024	Pauline Bourdon (2)	—

World Rugby Women's 15s Dream Team of the Year
Year	Forwards		Backs		Total
Year	No.	Players	No.	Players	Total
2021	1.	Annaëlle Deshayes	9.	Laure Sansus	6
2021	2.	Agathe Sochat	10.	Caroline Drouin	6
2021	4.	Safi N'Diaye	14.	Caroline Boujard	6
2022	5.	Madoussou Fall	9.	Laure Sansus (2)	2
2023	—		9.	Pauline Bourdon	2
2023	—		12.	Gabrielle Vernier	2
2024	—		9.	Pauline Bourdon (2)	1
2025	—		11.	Joanna Grisez	1

World Rugby Women's 15s Try of the Year
Year	Date	Nominee	Match	Tournament	Winner
2021	3 April	Emilie Boulard	vs. Wales	Six Nations	Emilie Boulard
2021	17 April	Romane Ménager	vs. Ireland	Six Nations	Emilie Boulard
2023	23 April	Charlotte Escudero	vs. Wales	Six Nations	—
2024	29 September	Marine Ménager	vs. Canada	WXV 1	Marine Ménager

==== Six Nations Awards ====
The following France players have been recognised in the Women's Six Nations Awards since 2020:

Six Nations Player of the Championship
Year	Nominee	Winner
2021	Caroline Boujard	—
2022	Madoussou Fall	Laure Sansus
2022	Laure Sansus	Laure Sansus
2023	Gabrielle Vernier	Gabrielle Vernier
2024	Romane Ménager	—
2025	Manaé Feleu	—
2026	Pauline Bourdon	—

Six Nations Try of the Championship
Year	Nominee	Match	Winner	Ref
2024	Annaëlle Deshayes	vs. Italy	—	
2025	Joanna Grisez	vs. England	Joanna Grisez	
2026	Pauline Bourdon	vs. England	—	

Six Nations Team of the Championship
Year	Forwards		Backs		Total
Year	No.	Players	No.	Players	Total
2022	4.	Madoussou Fall	9.	Laure Sansus	2
2023	—		9.	Pauline Bourdon	3
2023	—		12.	Gabrielle Vernier	3
2023	—		13.	Marine Ménager	3
2024	4.	Manaé Feleu	—		2
2024	8.	Romane Ménager	—		2
2025	5.	Manaé Feleu (2)	9.	Pauline Bourdon (2)	4
2025	8.	Teani Feleu	15.	Morgane Bourgeois	4
2026	1.	Ambre Mwayembe	9.	Pauline Bourdon (3)	4
2026	4.	Madoussou Fall (2)	14.	Anaïs Grando	4

== Record ==
Women's World Rugby Rankings Top 20 rankings as of 6 April 2026
Rank	Change*	Team	Points
1	Steady	England	98.09
2	Steady	Canada	91.53
3	Steady	New Zealand	89.85
4	Steady	France	83.60
5	Steady	Ireland	78.20
6	Steady	Scotland	77.39
7	Steady	Australia	75.46
8	Steady	United States	72.90
9	Steady	Italy	72.37
10	Steady	South Africa	71.62
11	Steady	Japan	69.72
12	Steady	Wales	66.13
13	Steady	Fiji	63.98
14	Steady	Spain	62.42
15	Steady	Samoa	59.72
16	Steady	Hong Kong	57.56
17	Steady	Netherlands	57.42
18	Steady	Russia	55.10
19	Steady	Kazakhstan	53.88
20	▲1	Germany	51.10
*Change from the previous week

Note: Although the FFR list all of the following as full internationals or "test matches" in their publications (including their website), they do not award caps for all of the games. In particular, no caps have been officially awarded for appearances before 1989 (when the FFR became responsible for women's rugby), and most matches in FIRA tournaments after 2004 are uncapped. As a result, there can be a significant difference between the number of appearances players may have made for France and their official number of caps.

=== Overall ===
(Full internationals only)
Correct as of 23 August 2025

France internationals since 1982
Opponent	First played	Games played	Won	Drawn	Lost	Win rate (%)
Australia	1998	6	4	0	2	66.67%
Belgium	1988	1	1	0	0	100%
Canada	1996	18	9	0	9	50%
England	1991	58	14	0	44	24.14%
Fiji	2022	1	1	0	0	100%
Germany	1997	1	1	0	0	100%
Great Britain	1986	4	3	0	1	75%
Ireland	1994	33	29	1	3	87.88%
Italy	1985	30	25	1	4	80%
Japan	1991	3	3	0	0	100%
Kazakhstan	1998	3	3	0	0	100%
Netherlands	1982	12	11	0	1	91.66%
New Zealand	1996	12	5	0	7	41.67%
Scotland	1998	31	25	1	5	80.65%
South Africa	2009	5	4	1	0	80%
Spain	1989	19	14	0	5	73.68%
Sweden	1991	4	4	0	0	100%
United States	1996	14	11	1	2	78.57%
Wales	1994	31	27	0	4	87.1%
Total	1982	286	194	5	87	68.88%

=== World Cup ===
Rugby World Cup
Year	Round	Position	GP	W	D	L	PF	PA
(Wales) 1991	Semi-finals	*Third	3	2	0	1	99	13
(Scotland) 1994	3rd Place Playoff	Third	4	3	0	1	163	18
(Netherlands) 1998	7th Place Playoff	8th	5	2	0	3	56	72
(Spain) 2002	3rd Place Playoff	Third	4	3	0	1	93	58
(Canada) 2006	3rd Place Playoff	Third	5	3	0	2	102	85
(England) 2010	3rd Place Playoff	4th	5	3	0	2	70	91
(France) 2014	3rd Place Playoff	Third	5	4	0	1	139	42
(Ireland) 2017	3rd Place Playoff	Third	5	4	0	1	175	62
(New Zealand) 2021	3rd Place Playoff	Third	6	4	0	2	190	46
(England) 2025	3rd Place Playoff	4th	6	4	0	2	226	105
(Australia) 2029	Qualified as 2025 Women's Rugby World Cup semi-finalists							
(United States) 2033	TBD							
Total	10/10	3rd^{†}	48	32	0	16	1,313	592
Champion Runner-up Third place Fourth place: * Tied placing ^{†} Best placing / Home venue

== See also ==
- Rugby union in France
- France national rugby union team (men's team)
