= 2021 Rugby World Cup =

Women's rugby union event in New Zealand

Tournament details
- Host nation: New Zealand
- Dates: 8 October – 12 November 2022
- No. of nations: 12

Final positions
- Champions: New Zealand (6th title)
- Runner-up: England
- Third place: France

Tournament statistics
- Matches played: 26
- Attendance: 140,000 (5,385 per match)
- Tries scored: 185 (average 7.12 per match)
- Top scorer(s): (England) Emily Scarratt (44)
- Most tries: (New Zealand) Portia Woodman (7)
- Points scored: 1,202 (average 46.23 per match)

The 2021 Rugby World Cup was the ninth staging of the Women's Rugby World Cup, as organised by World Rugby. It was held from 8 October to 12 November 2022 in Auckland and Whangārei, New Zealand. It was originally scheduled to be held in 2021, but was postponed by one year due to the COVID-19 pandemic.

It was the first women's Rugby World Cup to be hosted by New Zealand, and by a country in the Southern Hemisphere. New Zealand were also the defending champions.

The tournament introduced several format changes, such as the replacement of classification play-offs in the knockout stage with quarter-finals, and a longer scheduling window with at least five days between matches.

== Host selection ==
On 14 November 2018, World Rugby announced that New Zealand would host the 2021 Women's Rugby World Cup, beating out a competing bid by Australia—the only other country to officially submit a bid for the tournament. It was the first Women's Rugby World Cup to be hosted by a country in the Southern Hemisphere.

In November 2019, World Rugby announced that in an effort to create greater parity between the men's and women's Rugby World Cup, the Women's Rugby World Cup would be marketed as the "Rugby World Cup" with no gender designation beginning with the 2021 tournament. This change would be short-lived: with a further rebranding in 2023 to "provide clarity and consistency for fans", World Rugby announced that it would reinstate the "Women's Rugby World Cup" title for the next tournament in 2025, and instead rebrand the Rugby World Cup as the "Men's Rugby World Cup" for its 2027 edition.

The tournament was originally scheduled to be held from 18 September to 16 October 2021. On 2 March 2021, World Rugby announced that the tournament would be postponed to 2022 due to the COVID-19 pandemic, as "it has become clear in recent discussions with key partners including New Zealand Rugby, the New Zealand government and participating unions, that, given the scale of the event and the COVID-19 related uncertainties, it is just not possible to deliver the environment for all teams to be the best that they can be on the sport's greatest stage." New Zealand's Zero-COVID policy at the time also meant that teams would have been subject to strict quarantine arrangements in order to enter the country, whose international borders were closed. The rescheduling also upheld the ongoing practice of holding the women's Rugby World Cup in the year that follows the Summer Olympics, as the 2020 Summer Olympics were also postponed by one year to 2021 due to COVID-19.

On 12 May 2021, it was announced that the tournament had been rescheduled to 8 October through 12 November 2022; the window of the tournament was also extended and realigned to allow for at least five days rest between matches, as with the men's Rugby World Cup. All matches were scheduled on weekends. The tournament remained branded as the "2021 Rugby World Cup", but with a "Playing in 2022" subtitle.

== Venues ==
Locations of the 2021 Rugby World Cup

Auckland	Whangārei	Auckland
Eden Park	Northland Events Centre	Waitakere Stadium
Capacity: 60,000	Capacity: 30,000	Capacity: 4,901

The three venues are in the Auckland and Northland regions of Te Ika-a-Māui, the North Island. Three opening games were hosted at New Zealand's national stadium Eden Park. Eden Park also hosted the semi-finals, third place play-off and final. Other pool games and the quarter-finals were held at the Northland Events Centre and Waitakere Stadium.

== Qualifying ==
Qualification status: Qualified for the 2021 Rugby World Cup. Failed to qualify. Withdrew or suspended.

New Zealand, the host nation, had already qualified automatically winning the 2017 tournament before being announced as hosts. A further six teams (England, France, United States, Canada, Australia and Wales) qualified automatically as top seven finishers at the 2017 tournament. Scotland was announced as the winner of the repechage tournament on 25 February 2022.

=== Qualified teams ===
	Africa	Americas	Asia	Europe	Oceania
Automatic Qualifiers		Canada (AQ); United States (AQ)		England (AQ); France (AQ); Wales (AQ)	Australia (AQ); New Zealand (Hosts/Holders)
Regional Qualifiers	South Africa (Africa 1)		Japan (Asia 1)	Italy (Europe 1)	Fiji (Oceania 1)
Cross-Regional Repechage play-off (Note: South America/Africa play-off: South America 1 will progress to a play-off with the second-placed team from Africa to determine the fourth team to compete in the Repechage. Repechage tournament: The final team to qualify for RWC 2021 will be decided via the new Repechage tournament, which will take place in 2020. The tournament will consist of the second placed teams in the Asia, Europe and Oceania regional tournaments and the winner of the play-off between South America and second-placed team from the Africa regional qualifier.)	Kenya (Africa 2)	Colombia (South America 1)			
Repechage tournament		Colombia (South America 1)	Kazakhstan (Asia 2)	Scotland (Europe 2)	Samoa (Oceania 2) (Note: Samoa withdrew from the Repechage tournament due to COVID-19 related restrictions.)

Qualified team

Qualified teams
Region	Team	Qualification method	Previous apps	Previous best result	World Rugby Ranking
Africa	South Africa	2019 Rugby Africa Women's Cup winners	3	Tenth place (2010, 2014)	13
Asia	Japan	2021 Asia Rugby Women's Championship winners (by World Rankings)	4	Eighth place (1994)	12
Europe	England	Top 7 in 2017	8	Champions (1994, 2014)	1
Europe	France	Top 7 in 2017	8	Third place (1991, 1994, 2002, 2006, 2014, 2017)	3
Europe	Italy	European Qualification tournament winners	4	Plate semi-finals (Seventh/Eighth place) (1991)	8
Europe	Wales	Top 7 in 2017	6	Fourth place (1994)	11
Europe	Scotland	Final Qualification Tournament winners	5	Fifth place (1994)	9
North America	Canada	Top 7 in 2017	8	Runners-up (2014)	4
North America	United States	Top 7 in 2017	8	Champions (1991)	6
Oceania	Australia	Top 7 in 2017	6	Third place (2010)	5
Oceania	Fiji	Oceania play-off winners	0	N/A	21
Oceania	New Zealand	Top 7 in 2017/Hosts	7	Champions (1998, 2002, 2006, 2010, 2017)	2

== Match officials ==
On 26 May 2022, World Rugby announced the team of 18 officials from 11 unions for the World Cup, including an "all-female team of referees." English official Sara Cox served in her fourth World Cup, while South African official Aimee Barrett-Theron and Irish official Joy Neville adjudicates in their second World Cups.

On 21 September 2022, World Rugby released the list of appointments for the pool phase—New Zealander Maggie Cogger-Orr was selected to oversee the opening match of the tournament.

On 8 November 2022, World Rugby announced that Scottish referee Hollie Davidson would adjudicate the final.

Referees (9)

- (South Africa) Aimee Barrett-Theron
- (New Zealand) Maggie Cogger-Orr
- (England) Sara Cox
- (Scotland) Hollie Davidson
- (France) Aurélie Groizeleau
- (New Zealand) Lauren Jenner
- (Australia) Amber McLachlan
- (Italy) Clara Munarini
- (Ireland) Joy Neville

Assistants (5)

- (Italy) Maria Beatrice Benvenuti
- (France) Doriane Domenjo
- (Australia) Tyler Miller
- (United States) Kat Roche
- (Canada) Julianne Zussman

Television Match Officials (4)

- (Canada) Chris Assmus
- (New Zealand) Lee Jeffrey
- (England) Ian Tempest
- (Wales) Ben Whitehouse

== Draw ==
Seedings for the pools of the 2021 World Cup were based on the teams' World Rugby Rankings. The draw, hosted by sports pundit and former English and British and Irish Lions international Ugo Monye and sports journalist and presenter Elma Smit, was conducted on 20 November 2020 in the SkyCity Theatre in Auckland, and used the World Rankings as of 1 January 2020, before the global outbreak of the COVID-19 pandemic. This is the first case in which the Women's World Cup was drawn based on World Rankings instead of classification from the previous World Cup. The automatic qualifiers from 2017 were allocated to their respective bands based on their rankings – and the remaining 5 qualifying places were allocated to Bands 3 and 4 based on previous World Cup playing strength:

- Band 1, made up of the top 3 automatic qualifiers, (1–3)
- Band 2, made up of the next 3 automatic qualifiers, (4–6)
- Band 3, made up of the 7th automatic qualifier, Europe 1 and Africa 1
- Band 4, made up of Asia 1, Oceania 1 and Repechage winner

This meant the 12 teams, qualified and qualifiers, were seeded thus:

Band 1
- New Zealand (1)
- England (2)
- Canada (3)
Band 2
- France (4)
- Australia (5)
- United States (6)
Band 3
- Wales (7)
- Italy (Europe 1)
- South Africa (Africa 1)
Band 4
- Japan (Asia 1)
- Fiji (Oceania 1)
- Scotland (Final Qualification Tournament)

The pools were respectively drawn by New Zealand Prime Minister, Jacinda Ardern, former Black Ferns internationals, Melodie Robinson and Farah Palmer and former All Blacks international, Dan Carter.

== Squads ==
Each team submitted a squad of 32 players for the tournament.

== Pool stage ==
Each pool was a single round-robin of six games, in which each team played one match against each of the other teams in the same pool. Teams were awarded four points for a win, two points for a draw. A team that scored four or more tries earned a bonus point, as did a team that lost by fewer than eight points.

The tournament comprised twelve teams divided into three pools of four teams. The top two teams in each pool, as well as the best two third-placed teams progressed to the quarter-finals.

Fixtures were announced on 28 January 2021.

Tie-breaking criteria

If two or more teams are tied on match points, the following tiebreakers applied;

1. The winner of the match between the two teams
2. Difference between points scored for and points scored against in all pool matches
3. Difference between tries scored for and tries scored against in all pool matches
4. Points scored in all pool matches
5. Most tries scored in all pool matches

Key to colours in pool tables
Advanced to the quarter-finals as one of the top two teams in a pool
Advanced to the quarter-finals as one of the two best third place teams

Pld = Number of games played; W = Number of games won; D = Number of games drawn; L = Number of games lost; TF = Number of tries scored (tries for); PF = Total number of points scored by the team (points for); PA = Total number of points scored against the team (points against); +/− = Points difference, PF−PA; BP = Bonus pool points; Pts = Total number of pool points

=== Pool A ===
Pos	Team	Pld	W	D	L	PF	PA	PD	T	B	Pts
1	New Zealand	3	3	0	0	154	29	+125	26	3	15
2	Australia	3	2	0	1	44	60	−16	6	0	8
3	Wales	3	1	0	2	37	84	−47	5	1	5
4	Scotland	3	0	0	3	27	89	−62	5	2	2

8 October 2022	Australia	17–41	New Zealand	Eden Park, Auckland
9 October 2022	Wales	18–15	Scotland	Northland Events Centre, Whangārei
15 October 2022	Scotland	12–14	Australia	Northland Events Centre, Whangārei
16 October 2022	Wales	12–56	New Zealand	Waitakere Stadium, Auckland
22 October 2022	Australia	13–7	Wales	Northland Events Centre, Whangārei
22 October 2022	New Zealand	57–0	Scotland	Northland Events Centre, Whangārei

=== Pool B ===
Pos	Team	Pld	W	D	L	PF	PA	PD	T	B	Pts
1	Canada	3	3	0	0	92	31	+61	16	3	15
2	Italy	3	2	0	1	55	40	+15	8	1	9
3	United States	3	1	0	2	54	68	−14	8	1	5
4	Japan	3	0	0	3	30	92	−62	5	0	0

9 October 2022	United States	10–22	Italy	Northland Events Centre, Whangārei
9 October 2022	Japan	5–41	Canada	Northland Events Centre, Whangārei
15 October 2022	United States	30–17	Japan	Northland Events Centre, Whangārei
16 October 2022	Italy	12–22	Canada	Waitakere Stadium, Auckland
23 October 2022	Japan	8–21	Italy	Waitakere Stadium, Auckland
23 October 2022	Canada	29–14	United States	Waitakere Stadium, Auckland

=== Pool C ===
Pos	Team	Pld	W	D	L	PF	PA	PD	T	B	Pts
1	England	3	3	0	0	172	26	+146	28	2	14
2	France	3	2	0	1	91	18	+73	14	3	11
3	Fiji	3	1	0	2	40	145	−105	6	0	4
4	South Africa	3	0	0	3	22	136	−114	3	1	1

8 October 2022	South Africa	5–40	France	Eden Park, Auckland
8 October 2022	Fiji	19–84	England	Eden Park, Auckland
15 October 2022	France	7–13	England	Northland Events Centre, Whangārei
16 October 2022	Fiji	21–17	South Africa	Waitakere Stadium, Auckland
22 October 2022	France	44–0	Fiji	Northland Events Centre, Whangārei
23 October 2022	England	75–0	South Africa	Waitakere Stadium, Auckland

=== Ranking of qualified teams ===
Team	Pld	W	D	L	PF	PA	PD	T	B	Pts	Result
New Zealand	3	3	0	0	154	29	+125	26	3	15	Pool leaders
Canada	3	3	0	0	92	31	+61	16	3	15	Pool leaders
England	3	3	0	0	172	26	+146	28	2	14	Pool leaders
France	3	2	0	1	91	18	+73	14	3	11	Pool runners-up
Italy	3	2	0	1	55	40	+15	8	1	9	Pool runners-up
Australia	3	2	0	1	44	60	−16	6	0	8	Pool runners-up
United States	3	1	0	2	54	68	−14	8	1	5	Third in pool
Wales	3	1	0	2	37	84	−47	5	1	5	Third in pool
Fiji	3	1	0	2	40	145	−105	6	0	4	Third in pool

Source: World Rugby
Rules for classification: 1) Points 2) Point differential 3) Points for 4) Most tries scored for

== Knockout stage ==
Quarter-finals
29 October – Whangārei
France	39
Italy	3
29 October – Whangārei
New Zealand	55
Wales	3
30 October – Auckland (Waitakere)
England	41
Australia	5
30 October – Auckland (Waitakere)
Canada	32
United States	11

Semi-finals
5 November – Auckland (Eden)
France	24
New Zealand	25
5 November – Auckland (Eden)
England	26
Canada	19

Final
12 November – Auckland (Eden)
New Zealand	34
England	31
Third place
12 November – Auckland (Eden)
France	36
Canada	0

=== Quarter-finals ===
29 October 2022
16:30 NZDT (UTC+13)

France (4)	39–3	(5) Italy
Try: Grisez (3) 3' c, 68' m, 70' c Penalty try 61'; Touyé 64' c Con: Drouin (2/2) 3', 65'; Queyroi (1/2) 71'; Pen: Drouin (2/2) 40', 55'	Report	Pen: Sillari (1/1) 39'

Northland Events Centre, Whangārei
Referee: Hollie Davidson (Scotland)

29 October 2022
19:30 NZDT (UTC+13)

New Zealand (1)	55–3	(8) Wales
Try: Woodman (2) 13' c, 43' c Tui 20' m Hirini 27' c Rule 38' c Connor (2) 49' m, 64' m A. Bremner 56' m Demant 68' m Con: Demant (5/7) 14', 29', 39', 45', 50'	Report	Pen: Bevan (1/1) 16'

Northland Events Centre, Whangārei
Referee: Aimee Barrett-Theron (South Africa)

30 October 2022
13:30 NZDT (UTC+13)

England (3)	41–5	(6) Australia
Try: Hunter 8' c M. Packer (3) 30' m, 39' c, 80' c Ward 43' m Cokayne 53' m Matthews 65' m Con: Scarratt (2/6) 9', 39'; Rowland (1/1) 80'	Report	Try: Chancellor 40' m

Waitakere Stadium, Auckland
Referee: Maggie Cogger-Orr (New Zealand)

30 October 2022
16:30 NZDT (UTC+13)

Canada (2)	32–11	(7) United States
Try: Hunt 16' c Paquin 20' m Farries 41' c Tessier 57' c Con: de Goede (3/4) 14', 42', 58'; Pen: de Goede (2/2) 47', 65'	Report	Try: Kitlinski 9' m Pen: Kelter (2/2) 38', 45'

Waitakere Stadium, Auckland
Referee: Joy Neville (Ireland)

=== Semi-finals ===
5 November 2022
16:30 NZDT (UTC+13)

Canada	19–26	England
Try: Paquin 19' m Corrigan 35' c Beukeboom 68' c Con: de Goede (2/3) 36', 68'	Report	Try: M. Packer 8' c Dow (2) 15' m, 50' m Con: Scarratt (1/3) 10'; Pen: Scarratt (3/3) 40', 43', 71'

Eden Park, Auckland
Referee: Aimee Barrett-Theron (South Africa)

5 November 2022
19:30 NZDT (UTC+13)

New Zealand	25–24	France
Try: Fluhler 35' c Tui 44' m Fitzpatrick 57' c Con: Holmes (1/2) 37'; Demant (1/1) 58'; Pen: Holmes (1/2) 29'; Demant (1/1) 63'	Report	Try: R. Ménager (2) 23' c, 65' c Vernier 40' c Con: Drouin (3/3) 23', 40' +1, 66'; Pen: Drouin (1/2) 7'

Eden Park, Auckland
Attendance: 22,043
Referee: Joy Neville (Ireland)

=== Third-place play-off ===
12 November 2022
16:30 NZDT (UTC+13)

Canada	0–36	France
	Report	Try: Fall 12' c Bourdon 36' c Ménager (2) 41' m, 61' c Deshayes 44' c Con: Drouin (4/5) 13', 37', 45', 62'; Pen: Drouin 21'

Eden Park, Auckland
Referee: Sara Cox (England)

=== Final ===
12 November 2022
19:30 NZDT (UTC+13)

England	31–34	New Zealand
Try: Kildunne 3' c Cokayne (3) 13' c, 32' c, 54' m, Packer 21' m Con: Scarratt (3/5) 4' 15' 33'	Report	Try: Ponsonby 18' c Leti-I'iga (2) 25' c, 71' m Rule 40' m Fluhler 41' m Murray 49' m Con: Holmes (2/6) 20' 26'

Eden Park, Auckland
Attendance: 42,579
Referee: Hollie Davidson (Scotland)

== Statistics ==
=== Points scorers ===
Pos	Name	Team	T	C	P	DG	Pts
1	Emily Scarratt	England	1	12	5	0	44
2	Caroline Drouin	France	1	12	3	0	38
3	Portia Woodman	New Zealand	7	0	0	0	35
3	Renee Holmes	New Zealand	2	11	1	0	35
5	Ruahei Demant	New Zealand	2	9	1	0	31
6	Amy Cokayne	England	6	0	0	0	30
6	Marlie Packer	England	6	0	0	0	30
6	Emily Tuttosi	Canada	6	0	0	0	30
9	Alev Kelter	United States	2	4	3	0	27
10	Ruby Tui	New Zealand	5	0	0	0	25

=== Try scorers ===
Pos	Name	Team	Tries
1	Portia Woodman	New Zealand	7
2	Amy Cokayne	England	6
2	Marlie Packer	England	6
2	Emily Tuttosi	Canada	6
5	Ruby Tui	New Zealand	5
6	Abigail Dow	England	4
6	Paige Farries	Canada	4
6	Joanna Grisez	France	4
6	Claudia MacDonald	England	4
6	Connie Powell	England	4

== Broadcasting ==
Spark Sport will be the host broadcaster for the Rugby World Cup, broadcasting all matches live and on demand through its online streaming platform. Three will broadcast a selection of games free-to-air on New Zealand television.

- Australia: Stan Sport and Nine Network
- Canada: TSN and RDS
- France: TF1
- Ireland: Eir Sport and RTÉ
- Italy: RAI and Sky Sport
- New Zealand: Spark Sport and Three
- South Africa: SuperSport
- Spain: Movistar Plus+
- United Kingdom: ITV
- USA: NBC Sports and TUDN

== Sources ==
- Rugby World Cup Women's Stats Archive
- Women's Rugby Data

== See also ==
- 2023 Rugby World Cup (men's)
- 2022 Rugby World Cup Sevens (separate tournaments for men and women as part of a single event)
