= 2022 Women's Six Nations Championship squads =

Annual rugby union competition in Europe

The 2022 Women's Six Nations Championship was the 21st Women's Six Nations Championship, an annual rugby union competition contested by the national teams of England, France, Ireland, Italy, Scotland and Wales. England were the defending champions, having won a COVID shortened version of the tournament in 2021. There was no limit on the number of players each team may call up to play in the competition.

Note: Number of caps are indicated as of the first match of the tournament (26 March 2022).

== England ==
Head coach: (England) Simon Middleton

On 7 March, Simon Middleton announced England's 40-player squad for the tournament

Player	Position	Caps	Club/Province
Zoe Aldcroft	Lock	28	Gloucester-Hartpury
Sarah Beckett	Number 8	22	Harlequins
Sarah Bern	Prop	40	Bristol Bears
Hannah Botterman	Prop	26	Saracens
Shaunagh Brown	Prop	24	Harlequins
Rowena Burnfield	Lock	50	Wasps
May Campbell	Hooker	0	Saracens
Byrony Cleall	Prop	5	Wasps
Poppy Cleall	Lock / Number 8	50	Saracens
Amy Cokayne	Hooker	60	Harlequins
Vickii Cornborough	Prop	64	Harlequins
Lark Davies	Hooker	35	Loughborough Lightning
Vicky Fleetwood	Flanker	79	Saracens
Rosie Galligan	Lock	1	Harlequins
Detysha Harper	Prop	5	Loughborough Lightning
Sarah Hunter (c)	Number 8	130	Loughborough Lightning
Sadia Kabeya	Flanker	2	Loughborough Lightning
Alex Matthews	Flanker	45	Worcester Warriors
Harriet Millar-Mills	Number 8	66	Wasps
Maud Muir	Prop	4	Wasps
Marlie Packer	Flanker	79	Saracens
Connie Powell	Hooker	1	Gloucester-Hartpury
Abbie Ward	Lock	50	Bristol Bears
Holly Aitchison	Flyhalf	4	Saracens
Jess Breach	Wing	19	Harlequins
Heather Cowell	Wing	2	Harlequins
Abigail Dow	Wing	22	Wasps
Zoe Harrison	Flyhalf	34	Saracens
Natasha Hunt	Scrumhalf	55	Gloucester-Hartpury
Leanne Infante	Scrumhalf	48	Bristol Bears
Ellie Kildunne	Fullback	18	Harlequins
Sarah McKenna	Fullback	39	Saracens
Lucy Packer	Scrumhalf	1	Harlequins
Amber Reed	Centre	58	Bristol Bears
Helena Rowland	Flyhalf	10	Loughborough Lightning
Emily Scarratt	Centre	96	Loughborough Lightning
Emma Sing	Fullback	0	Gloucester-Hartpury
Lagi Tuima	Centre	12	Harlequins
Lydia Thompson	Wing	50	Worcester Warriors
Ella Wyrwas	Scrumhalf	0	Saracens

== France ==
Head coach: (France) Annick Hayraud

On 14 March 2022 Annick Hayraud announced their 35 player squad for the tournament.

On 29 March Céline Ferer, Maïlys Traoré and Safi N'Diaye were all added to the squad to face Ireland

Caroline Boujard was added to the squad prior to the fourth round match against Wales.

Player	Position	Caps	Club/Province
Julie Annery	Flanker	9	Stade Français Paris
Cyrielle Banet	Wing	20	Montpellier RC
Rose Bernadou	Prop	6	Montpellier RC
Axelle Berthoumieu	Flanker	6	Blagnac Rugby Féminin
Camille Boudaud	Centre	12	Stade Toulousain Rugby
Caroline Boujard	Wing	28	Montpellier RC
Emilie Boulard	Fullback	6	RC Chilly Mazarin
Yllana Brosseau	Prop	4	Stade Bordelais
Marie-Aurélie Castel	Wing	4	Stade Rennais Rugby
Alexandra Chambon	Scrumhalf	1	FC Grenoble Amazones
Annaëlle Deshaye	Prop	19	Lyon Olympique Universitaire
Coumba Diallo	Flanker	17	Stade Français Paris
Célia Domain	Prop	4	Blagnac Rugby Féminin
Caroline Drouin	Flyhalf	13	Stade Rennais Rugby
Charlotte Escudero	Number 8	0	Blagnac Rugby Féminin
Madoussou Fall	Lock	11	Stade Bordelais
Manae Feleu	Lock	1	FC Grenoble Amazones
Céline Ferer	Flanker	28	Stade Toulousain Rugby
Maëlle Filopon	Wing	11	Stade Toulousain Rugby
Audrey Forlani	Lock	23	Blagnac Rugby Féminin
Emeline Gros	Number 8	5	Montpellier RC
Gaëlle Hermet (c)	Flanker	33	Stade Toulousain Rugby
Chloé Jacquet	Fullback	3	Lyon Olympique Universitaire
Clara Joyeux	Prop	25	Blagnac Rugby Féminin
Assia Khalfaoui	Prop	0	Stade Bordelais
Coco Lindelauf	Prop	3	Blagnac Rugby Féminin
Mélissande Llorens	Wing	1	Blagnac Rugby Féminin
Marjorie Mayans	Flanker	12	Blagnac Rugby Féminin
Marine Ménager	Wing	22	Montpellier RC
Romane Ménager	Flanker	23	Montpellier RC
Léa Murie	Wing	5	Stade Toulousain Rugby
Safi N'Diaye	Flanker	27	Montpellier RC
Morgane Peyronnet	Centre	17	Montpellier RC
Laure Sansus	Scrumhalf	17	Stade Toulousain Rugby
Agathe Sochat	Hooker	17	Stade Bordelais
Laure Touyé	Hooker	15	Montpellier RC
Maïlys Traoré	Prop	24	Stade Toulousain Rugby
Jessy Trémoulière	Fullback	22	ASM Romagnat Rugby Féminin
Gabrielle Vernier	Centre	22	Blagnac Rugby Féminin

== Ireland ==
Head coach: (Ireland) Greg McWilliams

On 3 March 2022 Greg McWilliams announced his 38 player squad for the tournament.

On 21 March Nichola Fryday was named captain for the tournament.

On 19 April 2022 Laura Feely, Laura Sheehan, Mary Healy, Shannon Touhey, Sene Naoupu, Niamh Byrne and Alice O'Dowd were all called up to the squad.

Player	Position	Caps	Club/Province
Amanda McQuade	Prop	0	Railway Union RFC
Katie O'Dwyer	Prop	5	Railway Union RFC
Chloe Pearse	Lock	2	UL Bohemian RFC
Linda Djougang	Prop	17	ASM Romagnat Rugby
Christy Haney	Prop	0	Blackrock College RFC
Laura Feely	Prop	19	Blackrock College RFC
Alice O'Dowd	Prop	0	Old Belvedere RFC
Claire Boles	Flanker	3	Railway Union RFC
Emma Hooban	Hooker	8	Blackrock College RFC
Neve Jones	Hooker	6	Gloucester-Hartpury
Nichola Fryday (c)	Lock	22	Exeter Chiefs
Sam Monaghan	Lock	5	Wasps
Aoife McDermott	Lock	18	Railway Union RFC
Anna McGann	Flanker	0	Railway Union RFC
Grace Moore	Flanker	1	Railway Union RFC
Dorothy Wall	Flanker	10	Blackrock College RFC
Aoife Wafer	Flanker	0	Blackrock College RFC
Brittany Hogan	Flanker	7	Old Belvedere RFC
Emma Murphy	Flanker	0	Railway Union RFC
Edel McMahon	Flanker	14	Wasps
Maeve Óg O'Leary	Flanker	1	Blackrock College RFC
Hannah O'Connor	Number 8	7	Blackrock College RFC
Aoibheann Reilly	Scrumhalf	0	Blackrock College RFC
Kathryn Dane	Scrumhalf	18	Old Belvedere RFC
Ailsa Hughes	Scrumhalf	13	Railway Union RFC
Nicole Cronin	Scrumhalf	16	UL Bohemian RFC
Mary Healy	Scrumhalf	1	Naas RFC/Suttonians RFC
Nikki Caughey	Centre	13	Railway Union RFC
Enya Breen	Centre	9	UL Bohemian RFC
Stacey Flood	Flyhalf	7	Railway Union RFC
Michelle Claffey	Centre	12	Blackrock College RFC
Eve Higgins	Centre	6	Railway Union RFC
Sene Naoupu	Centre	40	Old Belvedere RFC
Lucy Mulhall	Flyhalf	1	Wicklow RFC
Beibhinn Parsons	Wing	15	Blackrock College RFC
Amee-Leigh Murphy Crow	Wing	6	Railway Union RFC
Aoife Doyle	Wing	7	Railway Union RFC
Natasja Behan	Fullback	0	Blackrock College RFC
Lauren Delany	Fullback	18	Sale Sharks
Eimear Considine	Wing	23	UL Bohemian RFC
Molly Scuffil-McCabe	Scrumhalf	0	Railway Union RFC
Vicky Irwin	Centre	0	Sale Sharks
Laura Sheehan	Wing	5	Exeter Chiefs
Shannon Touhey	Wing	1	Tullamore RFC
Niamh Byrne	Wing	0	Railway Union RFC

== Italy ==
Head coach: (Italy) Andrea Di Giandomenico

On 14 March 2022 Andrea Di Giandomenico announced his squad for the championship.

Due to a COVID-19 outbreak in the Italy squad Federica Cipolla was added to the squad for the Round 3 game against Ireland.

Player	Position	Caps	Club/Province
Ilaria Arrighetti	Flanker	51	Stade Rennais
Sara Barattin	Scrumhalf	101	Villorba Rugby
Melissa Bettoni	Hooker	64	Stade Rennais
Francesca Barro	Prop	0	Valsugana Rugby Padova
Beatrice Capomaggi	Centre	4	Villorba Rugby
Federica Cipolla	Wing	0	Villorba Rugby
Alyssa D'Inca'	Centre	4	Villorba Rugby
Giordana Duca	Lock	24	Valsugana Rugby Padova
Valeria Fedrighi	Lock	28	Stade Toulousain
Alessandra Frangipani	Flanker	0	Villorba Rugby
Giada Franco	Flanker	21	Rugby Colorno
Manuela Furlan (c)	Fullback	81	Villorba Rugby
Lucia Gai	Prop	76	Valsugana Rugby Padova
Elisa Giordano	Flanker	49	Valsugana Rugby Padova
Francesca Granzotto	Centre / Wing	0	Unione Rugby Capitolina
Isabella Locatelli	Flanker	28	Rugby Colorno
Veronica Madia	Fullback	25	Rugby Colorno
Maria Magatti	Centre	38	CUS Milano Rugby
Alessia Margotti	Prop	0	Valsugana Rugby Padova
Gaia Maris	Prop	6	Valsugana Rugby Padova
Michela Merlo	Prop	11	Rugby Colorno
Aura Muzzo	Wing	20	Villorba Rugby
Vittoria Ostuni Minuzzi	Fullback	9	Valsugana Rugby Padova
Beatrice Rigoni	Wing	49	Valsugana Rugby Padova
Francesca Sberna	Flanker	6	Rugby Calvisano
Sara Seye	Prop	2	Rugby Calvisano
Michela Sillari	Centre	63	Valsugana Rugby Padova
Emanuela Stecca	Hooker	0	Villorba Rugby
Sofia Stefan	Scrumhalf	62	Valsugana Rugby Padova
Sara Tounesi	Lock	18	ASM Romagnat
Silvia Turani	Hooker	16	Rugby Colorno
Emma Stevanin	Prop	0	Valsugana Rugby Padova
Vittoria Vecchini	Hooker	3	Valsugana Rugby Padova
Beatrice Veronese	Flanker	7	Valsugana Rugby Padova

== Scotland ==
Head coach: (Scotland) Bryan Easson

On 15 March 2022 Scotland head coach Bryan Easson announced his team for the 2022 championship.

Panashe Muzambe was added to the squad prior to Scotland's second-round game against Wales.

Player	Position	Caps	Club/Province
Leah Bartlett	Prop	12	Loughborough Lightning
Christine Belisle	Prop	12	Loughborough Lightning
Sarah Bonar	Lock	25	Harlequins
Lisa Cockburn	Prop	23	Worcester Warriors
Katie Dougan	Prop	15	Gloucester-Hartpury
Eva Donaldson	Flanker	1	Edinburgh University
Evie Gallagher	Number 8	8	Stirling County
Jade Konkel	Number 8	49	Harlequins
Rachel Malcolm (c)	Flanker	24	Loughborough Lightning
Rachel McLachlan	Flanker	24	Sale Sharks
Louise McMillan	Lock	31	Hillhead Jordanhill
Panashe Muzambe	Prop	7	Garioch
Lyndsay O'Donnell	Lock	15	Worcester Warriors
Jodie Rettie	Hooker	18	Saracens
Lana Skeldon	Hooker	48	Worcester Warriors
Emma Wassell	Lock	52	Loughborough Lightning
Alison Wilson	Prop	0	Heriots
Molly Wright (rugby)	Hooker	10	Sale Sharks
Anne Young	Prop	1	Edinburgh University
Shona Campbell	Wing	2	Edinburgh University
Abi Evans	Wing	15	Darlington Mowden Park
Megan Gaffney	Wing	39	Loughborough Lightning
Coreen Grant	Centre	1	Saracens
Sarah Law	Flyhalf	48	Sale Sharks
Rhona Lloyd	Wing	33	Les Lioness du Stade Bordelaise
Caity Mattinson	Scrumhalf	1	Worcester Warriors
Jenny Maxwell	Scrumhalf	36	Loughborough Lightning
Mairi McDonald	Scrumhalf	7	Hillhead Jordanhill
Liz Musgrove	Wing	10	Watsonians
Helen Nelson	Flyhalf / Centre	37	Loughborough Lightning
Emma Orr	Centre	0	Biggar
Chloe Rollie	Fullback	45	Exeter Chiefs
Hannah Smith	Centre	30	Watsonians
Meryl Smith	Wing	0	Edinburgh University
Lisa Thomson	Centre	40	Sale Sharks
Evie Wills	Flyhalf	3	Hillhead Jordanhill

== Wales ==
Head coach: (Wales) Ioan Cunningham

On 17 March 2022 Cunningham named their 37 player squad for the championship.

Player	Position	Caps	Club/Province
Siwan Lillicrap (c)	Number 8	40	Bristol Bears
Alisha Butchers	Flanker	32	Bristol Bears
Alex Callender	Flanker	13	Worcester Warriors
Gwen Crabb	Lock	19	Gloucester-Hartpury
Cara Hope	Prop	14	Gloucester-Hartpury
Kat Evans	Hooker	3	Saracens
Abbie Fleming	Flanker	3	Exeter Chiefs
Cerys Hale	Prop	35	Gloucester-Hartpury
Sioned Harries	Flanker	58	Worcester Warriors
Natalia John	Lock	22	Bristol Bears
Manon Johnes	Flanker	13	Bristol Bears
Kelsey Jones	Hooker	22	Gloucester-Hartpury
Bethan Lewis	Flanker	22	Gloucester-Hartpury
Liliana Podpadec	Lock	0	Llandaff North
Carys Phillips	Hooker	54	Worcester Warriors
Gwenllian Pyrs	Prop	16	Sale Sharks
Donna Rose	Prop	6	Saracens
Jenni Scoble	Prop	0	Llandaff North
Caryl Thomas	Prop	58	Worcester Warriors
Sisilia Tuipulotu	Lock	0	Gloucester-Hartpury
Keira Bevan	Scrumhalf	38	Bristol Bears
Lleucu George	Centre	7	Gloucester-Hartpury
Emma Hennessy	Wing	0	Cheltenham Tigers
Hannah Jones	Centre	32	Gloucester-Hartpury
Jasmine Joyce	Wing	20	Bristol Bears
Courtney Keight	Centre	5	Bristol Bears
Caitlin Lewis	Wing	7	Exeter Chiefs
Kerin Lake	Centre	33	Gloucester-Hartpury
Ffion Lewis	Scrumhalf	17	Worcester Warriors
Lisa Neumann	Wing	22	Gloucester-Hartpury
Lowri Norkett	Centre	0	Pontyclun
Kayleigh Powell	Flyhalf	5	Bristol Bears
Gemma Rowland	Centre	19	Wasps
Emma Swords	Scrumhalf	0	Harlequins
Elinor Snowsill	Flyhalf	61	Bristol Bears
Niamh Terry	Flyhalf	4	Exeter Chiefs
Robyn Wilkins	Flyhalf	54	Gloucester-Hartpury
