= 2022 Women's Six Nations Championship =

Women's rugby union competition

- Date: 26 March – 30 April 2022
- Countries: England; France; Ireland; Italy; Scotland; Wales

Tournament statistics
- Champions: England (18th title)
- Grand Slam: England (16th title)
- Triple Crown: England (22nd title)
- Matches played: 15
- Attendance: 103,796 (6,920 per match)
- Tries scored: 101 (6.73 per match)
- Top point scorer: (England) Emily Scarratt (39)
- Top try scorer: (France) Laure Sansus (6)
- Player of the tournament: (France) Laure Sansus
- Official website: Official website

The 2022 Women's Six Nations Championship, known as the TikTok Women's Six Nations for sponsorship purposes, was the 21st series of the Women's Six Nations Championship, an annual women's rugby union competition contested by England, France, Ireland, Italy, Scotland and Wales. It was held from 26 March to 30 April 2022.

England entered the tournament as defending champions, having won the abridged version of the competition held in 2021.

England defeated France in the final round of the tournament to secure their 18th title and their 16th Grand Slam.

== Format ==
The 2022 competition saw the tournament return to its traditional format, with each participating country playing each other once, following the COVID disrupted tournament that took place in 2021. However the tournament retained its later starting date, which saw it begin after the conclusion of the men's competition.

== Participants ==
Nation	Stadiums			Head coach	Captain
Nation	Home stadium	Capacity	Location	Head coach	Captain
England	Kingsholm Stadium	16,115	Gloucester	(England) Simon Middleton	Sarah Hunter
England	Welford Road Stadium	25,849	Leicester	(England) Simon Middleton	Sarah Hunter
France	Stade des Alpes	20,068	Grenoble	(France) Annick Heyraut	Gaëlle Hermet
France	Stade Ernest-Wallon	19,500	Toulouse	(France) Annick Heyraut	Gaëlle Hermet
France	Stade Jean Dauger	16,934	Bayonne	(France) Annick Heyraut	Gaëlle Hermet
Ireland	RDS Arena	18,500	Dublin	(Ireland) Greg McWilliams	Nichola Fryday
Ireland	Musgrave Park	8,008	Cork	(Ireland) Greg McWilliams	Nichola Fryday
Ireland	Ravenhill Stadium	18,196	Belfast	(Ireland) Greg McWilliams	Nichola Fryday
Italy	Stadio Sergio Lanfranchi	5,000	Parma	(Italy) Andrea Di Giandomenico	Manuela Furlan
Scotland	Edinburgh Rugby Stadium	7,800	Edinburgh	(Scotland) Bryan Easson	Rachel Malcolm
Scotland	Scotstoun Stadium	4,765	Glasgow	(Scotland) Bryan Easson	Rachel Malcolm
Wales	Cardiff Arms Park	12,125	Cardiff	(Wales) Ioan Cunningham	Siwan Lillicrap

== Table ==
Position	Nation	Matches				Points			Tries		Bonus points			Table points
Position	Nation	Played	Won	Drawn	Lost	For	Against	Diff	For	Against	T BP	L BP	GS BP	Table points
1	England	5	5	0	0	282	22	+260	45	4	4	0	3	27
2	France	5	4	0	1	152	48	+104	22	6	4	0	0	20
3	Wales	5	2	0	3	69	139	–70	12	22	2	1	0	11
4	Ireland	5	2	0	3	68	158	–90	11	24	1	0	0	9
5	Italy	5	2	0	3	44	163	–119	4	24	0	0	0	8
6	Scotland	5	0	0	5	59	144	–85	7	21	0	3	0	3

Table ranking rules

- Four points are awarded for a win.
- Two points are awarded for a draw.
- A bonus point is awarded to a team that scores four or more tries, or loses by seven points or fewer. If a team scores four or more tries, and loses by seven points or fewer, they are awarded both bonus points.
- Three bonus points are awarded to a team that wins all five of their matches (a Grand Slam). This ensures that a Grand Slam winning team would top the table with at least 23 points, as another team could lose one match while winning two bonus points and win the other four matches while winning four bonus points for a maximum of 22 points.
- Tiebreakers
  - If two or more teams are tied on table points, the team with the better points difference (points scored less points conceded) is ranked higher.
  - If the above tiebreaker fails to separate tied teams, the team that scores the higher number of total tries (including penalty tries) in their matches is ranked higher.
  - If two or more teams remain tied after applying the above tiebreakers then those teams will be placed at equal rank; if the tournament has concluded and more than one team is placed first then the title will be shared between them.

== Fixtures ==
=== Round 1 ===
26 March 2022
12:00 GMT (UTC±00:00)

Scotland	5–57	England (1 BP)
Try: Rollie 15' m	Report	Try: M. Packer (3) 8' c, 29' m, 64' m P. Cleall 12' c Cowell 21' m Dow 24' c Infante 41' c Aitchison 52' c Powell 62' c Con: Scarratt (5/7) 8', 13', 26', 42', 52'; Rowland (1/2) 63'

Edinburgh Rugby Stadium, Edinburgh
Attendance: 3,988
Referee: Joy Neville (Ireland)

Team details

FB	15	Chloe Rollie
RW	14	Rhona Lloyd
OC	13	Hannah Smith
IC	12	Lisa Thomson
LW	11	Megan Gaffney	(substituted off) 53'
FH	10	Helen Nelson	(substituted off) 78'
SH	9	Jenny Maxwell	(substituted off) 63'
N8	8	Jade Konkel
OF	7	Rachel McLachlan
BF	6	Rachel Malcolm (c)
RL	5	Louise McMillan
LL	4	Emma Wassell
TP	3	Christine Belisle	(substituted off) 70'
HK	2	Lana Skeldon	(substituted off) 52'
LP	1	Leah Bartlett	(substituted off) 52'	(substituted on) 61'
Replacements:
HK	16	Molly Wright	(substituted on) 52'
PR	17	Lisa Cockburn	(substituted on) 52'	(substituted off) 61'
PR	18	Katie Dougan	(substituted on) 70'
LK	19	Lyndsay O'Donnell
FL	20	Eva Donaldson
SH	21	Sarah Law	(substituted on) 63'
FH	22	Meryl Smith	(substituted on) 78'
FB	23	Shona Campbell	(substituted on) 53'
Coach:
(Scotland) Bryan Easson

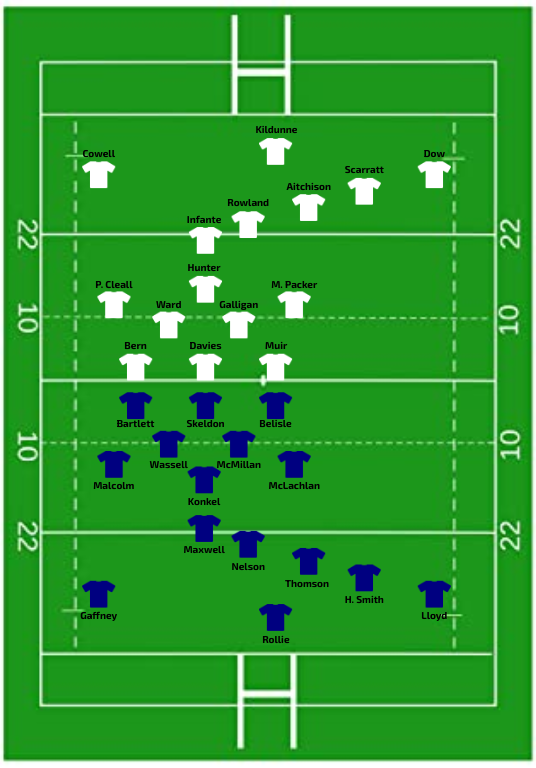

FB	15	Ellie Kildunne	(substituted off) 53'
RW	14	Heather Cowell
OC	13	Emily Scarratt	(substituted off) 58'
IC	12	Holly Aitchison
LW	11	Abigail Dow
FH	10	Helena Rowland
SH	9	Leanne Infante	(substituted off) 61'
N8	8	Sarah Hunter (c)
OF	7	Marlie Packer
BF	6	Poppy Cleall	(substituted off) 58'
RL	5	Abbie Ward
LL	4	Rosie Galligan	(substituted off) 61'
TP	3	Sarah Bern	(substituted off) 61'
HK	2	Lark Davies	(substituted off) 61'
LP	1	Maud Muir	(substituted off) 48'
Replacements:
HK	16	Connie Powell	(substituted on) 61'
PR	17	Victoria Cornborough	(substituted on) 48'
PR	18	Bryony Cleall	(substituted on) 61'
LF	19	Sarah Beckett	(substituted on) 61'
FL	20	Alex Matthews	(substituted on) 58'
SH	21	Lucy Packer	(substituted on) 61'
CE	22	Amber Reed	(substituted on) 58'
FB	23	Emma Sing	(substituted on) 53'
Coach:
(England) Simon Middleton

Player of the Match:
Marlie Packer (England)

Touch judges:
Aurélie Groizeleau (France)
Beatrice Benvenuti (Italy)
Television match official:
Matteo Liperini (Italy)

Notes:

- Meryl Smith (Scotland) and Emma Sing (England) made their international debuts.

26 March 2022
16:45 GMT (UTC±00:00)

Ireland	19–27	Wales (1 BP)
Try: Murphy Crowe 16' c Djougang 29' c Flood 56' m Con: Cronin (2/3) 18', 30'	Report	Try: Phillips 26' m Joyce 46' m Rose (2) 64' m, 73' c H. Jones 78' m Con: Wilkins (1/2) 74'

RDS Arena, Dublin
Attendance: 6,113
Referee: Kat Roche (United States)

Team details

FB	15	Eimear Considine	(yellow card) 70' to 80'
RW	14	Amee-Leigh Murphy Crowe		(substituted off) 53'
OC	13	Eve Higgins
IC	12	Stacey Flood
LW	11	Lucy Mulhall		(substituted off) 63'
FH	10	Nicole Cronin
SH	9	Aoibheann Reilly		(substituted off) 58'
N8	8	Brittany Hogan		(substituted off) 62'
OF	7	Edel McMahon
BF	6	Dorothy Wall
RL	5	Sam Monaghan
LL	4	Nichola Fryday (c)		(substituted off) 80'
TP	3	Katie O'Dwyer		(substituted off) 54'
HK	2	Neve Jones
LP	1	Linda Djougang
Replacements:
HK	16	Emma Hooban
PR	17	Chloe Pearse		(substituted on) 54'
PR	18	Christy Haney
LK	19	Anna McGann		(substituted on) 62'
FL	20	Hannah O'Connor		(substituted on) 80'
SH	21	Kathryn Dane		(substituted on) 58'
FH	22	Enya Breen		(substituted on) 63'
FB	23	Beibhinn Parsons		(substituted on) 54'
Coach:
(Ireland) Greg McWilliams

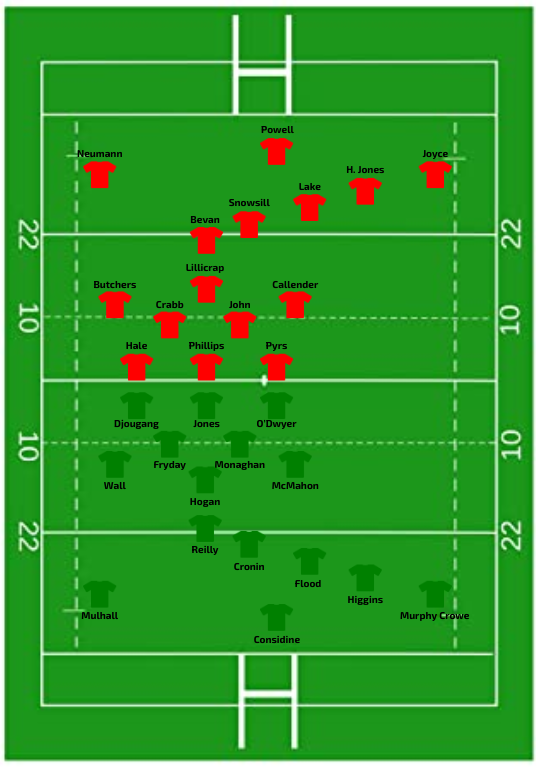

FB	15	Kayleigh Powell
RW	14	Lisa Neumann	(substituted off) 80'
OC	13	Hannah Jones
IC	12	Kerin Lake
LW	11	Jasmine Joyce
FH	10	Elinor Snowsill	(substituted off) 69'
SH	9	Keira Bevan	(substituted off) 55'
N8	8	Siwan Lillicrap (c)
OF	7	Alex Callender	(substituted off) 62'
BF	6	Alisha Butchers
RL	5	Gwen Crabb
LL	4	Natalia John	(substituted off) 51'
TP	3	Cerys Hale	(substituted off) 52'
HK	2	Carys Phillips	(substituted off) 52'
LP	1	Gwenllian Pyrs	(substituted off) 55'
Replacements:
HK	16	Kelsey Jones	(substituted on) 51'
PR	17	Cara Hope	(substituted on) 55'
PR	18	Donna Rose	(substituted on) 62'
LF	19	Sioned Harries	(substituted on) 51'
FL	20	Bethan Lewis	(substituted on) 62'
SH	21	Ffion Lewis	(substituted on) 55'
FH	22	Robyn Wilkins	(substituted on) 69'
CE	23	Sisilia Tuipulotu	(substituted on) 80'
Coach:
(Wales) Ioan Cunningham

Player of the Match:
Alisha Butchers (Wales)

Touch judges:
Hollie Davidson (Scotland)
Nikki O'Donnell (England)
Television match official:
Claire Hodnett (England)

Notes:

- Aoibheann Reilly, Anna McGann (both Ireland) and Sisilia Tuipulotu (Wales) made their international debuts.

27 March 2022
16:00 CEST (UTC+2)

(1 BP) France	39–6	Italy
Try: Fall 17' c Gros 25' c Murie 58' m Boulard 75' c Jacquet 78' c Con: Drouin (2/3) 18', 26'; Trémoulière (2/2) 76', 79'; Pen: Drouin (2/2) 3', 50'	Report	Pen: Sillari (2/2) 5', 33'

Stade des Alpes, Grenoble
Attendance: 13,500
Referee: Sara Cox (England)

FB	15	Chloé Jacquet
RW	14	Léa Murie
OC	13	Maëlle Filopon
IC	12	Gabrielle Vernier	(substituted off) 54'
LW	11	Marie-Aruélie Castel
FH	10	Caroline Drouin	(substituted off) 72'
SH	9	Alexandra Chambon	(substituted off) 52'
N8	8	Émeline Gros	(substituted off) 63'
OF	7	Gaëlle Hermet (c)
BF	6	Romane Ménager	(substituted off) 57'
RL	5	Audrey Forlani
LL	4	Madoussou Fall
TP	3	Clara Joyeux	(substituted off) 61'
HK	2	Agathe Sochat	(substituted off) 61'
LP	1	Annaëlle Deshayes	(substituted off) 61'
Replacements:
HK	16	Laure Touyé	(substituted on) 61'
PR	17	Coco Lindelauf	(substituted on) 61'
PR	18	Assia Khalfaoui	(substituted on) 61'
LK	19	Manae Feleu	(substituted on) 63'
FL	20	Axelle Berthoumieu	(substituted on) 57'
SH	21	Laure Sansus	(substituted on) 52'
FH	22	Jessy Trémoulière	(substituted on) 72'
FB	23	Émilie Boulard	(substituted on) 54'
Coach:
(France) Annick Heyraut

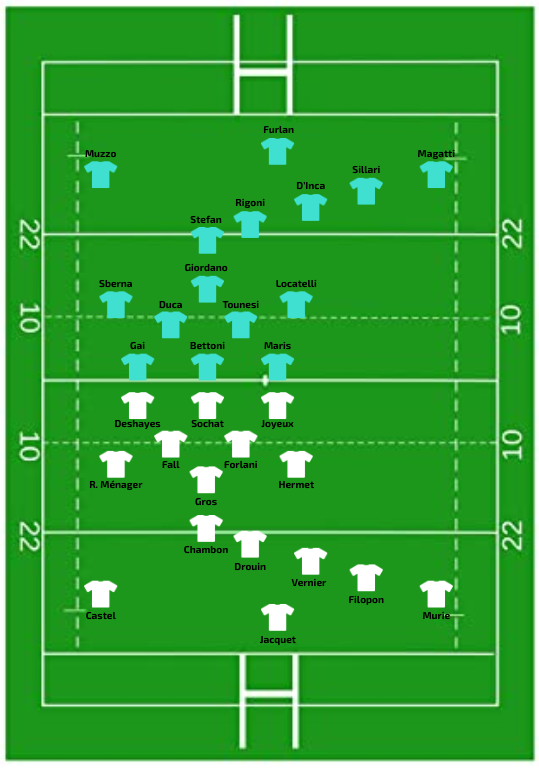

FB	15	Manuela Furlan (c)
RW	14	Aura Muzzo
OC	13	Michela Sillari	(substituted off) 54'
IC	12	Alyssa D'Incà	(substituted off) 50'
LW	11	Maria Magatti
FH	10	Beatrice Rigoni
SH	9	Sofia Stefan	(substituted off) 67'
N8	8	Elisa Giordano
OF	7	Isabella Locatelli
BF	6	Francesca Sberna	(substituted off) 72'
RL	5	Giordana Duca
LL	4	Sara Tounesi	(substituted off) 50'
TP	3	Lucia Gai	(substituted off) 67'
HK	2	Melissa Bettoni	(substituted off) 67'
LP	1	Gaia Maris	(substituted off) 72'
Replacements:
HK	16	Vittoria Vecchini	(substituted on) 67'
PR	17	Emanuela Stecca	(substituted on) 72'
PR	18	Sara Seye	(substituted on) 67'
LF	19	Valeria Fedrighi	(substituted on) 50'
FL	20	Alessandra Frangipani	(substituted on) 72'
SH	21	Sara Barattin	(substituted on) 67'
FH	22	Veronica Madia	(substituted on) 50'
FB	23	Vittoria Ostuni Minuzzi	(substituted on) 54'
Coach:
(Italy) Andrea Di Giandomenico

Player of the Match:
Madoussou Fall (France)

Assistant referees:
Aimee Barrett-Theron (South Africa)
Precious Pazani (Zimbabwe)
Television match official:
Chris Assmus (Canada)

Notes:

- Assia Khalfaoui (France), Alessandra Frangipani and Emanuela Stecca (both Italy) made their international debuts.

=== Round 2 ===
2 April 2022
15:15 CEST (UTC+2)

France	40–5	Ireland
Try: Llorens 11' m Sansus (2) 23' m, 47' c Forlani 30' m Joyeux 37' m Boulard 66' c Con: Drouin (1/5) 48'; Trémoulière (1/1) 67'; Pen: Drouin (2/2) 3', 18'	Report	Try: Higgins 55' m

Stade Ernest Wallon, Toulouse
Attendance: 12,000
Referee: Aimee Barrett-Theron (South Africa)

FB	15	Émilie Boulard	(yellow card) 80+3' to end'
RW	14	Cyrielle Banet
OC	13	Maëlle Filopon
IC	12	Gabrielle Vernier		(substituted off) 69'
LW	11	Mélissande Llorens
FH	10	Caroline Drouin		(substituted off) 56'
SH	9	Laure Sansus		(substituted off) 60'
N8	8	Romane Ménager
OF	7	Gaëlle Hermet (c)		(substituted off) 60'
BF	6	Axelle Berthoumieu
RL	5	Audrey Forlani
LL	4	Madoussou Fall		(substituted off) 56'
TP	3	Clara Joyeux		(substituted off) 56'
HK	2	Laure Touyé		(substituted off) 69'
LP	1	Coco Lindelauf		(substituted off) 56'
Replacements:
HK	16	Célia Domain		(substituted on) 69'
PR	17	Annaëlle Deshayes		(substituted on) 56'
PR	18	Assia Khalfaoui		(substituted on) 56'
LK	19	Céline Ferer		(substituted on) 56'
FL	20	Julie Annery		(substituted on) 60'
SH	21	Alexandra Chambon		(substituted on) 60'
FH	22	Jessy Trémoulière
FB	23	Chloé Jacquet
Coach:
(France) Annick Heyraut

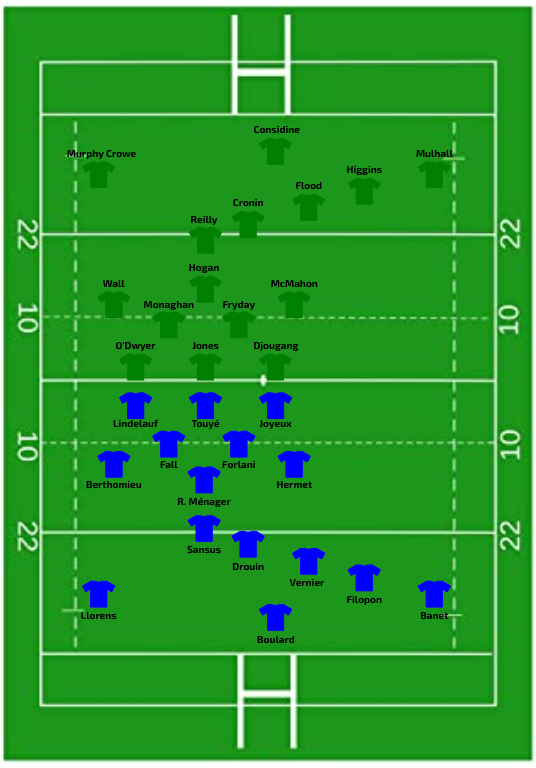

FB	15	Eimear Considine	(substituted off) 40'
RW	14	Amee-Leigh Murphy Crowe
OC	13	Eve Higgins
IC	12	Stacey Flood	(substituted off) 73'
LW	11	Lucy Mulhall
FH	10	Nicole Cronin
SH	9	Aoibheann Reilly	(substituted off) 56'
N8	8	Brittany Hogan	(substituted off) 56'
OF	7	Edel McMahon
BF	6	Dorothy Wall
RL	5	Sam Monaghan
LL	4	Nichola Fryday (c)	(substituted off) 73'
TP	3	Katie O'Dwyer	(substituted off) 40'
HK	2	Neve Jones	(substituted off) 56'
LP	1	Linda Djougang
Replacements:
HK	16	Emma Hooban	(substituted on) 56'
PR	17	Chloe Pearse
PR	18	Christy Haney	(substituted on) 40'
LK	19	Anna McGann	(substituted on) 73'
FL	20	Hannah O'Connor	(substituted on) 56'
SH	21	Kathryn Dane	(substituted on) 56'
CE	22	Enya Breen	(substituted on) 73'
WG	23	Beibhinn Parsons	(substituted on) 40'
Coach:
(Ireland) Greg McWilliams

Player of the Match:
Laure Sansus (France)

Assistant referees:
Clara Munarini (Italy)
Precious Pazani (Zimbabwe)
Television match official:
Ian Tempest (England)

Notes:

- Christy Haney (Ireland) made her international debut.

2 April 2022
16:45 BST (UTC+1)

(1 BP) Wales	24–19	Scotland (1 BP)
Try: Phillips 21' c Harries 45' c K. Jones 63' m F. Lewis 75' m Con: Bevan (2/2) 22', 47'; Snowsill (0/2)	Report	Try: Skeldon 3' c Lloyd (2) 31' c, 41' m Con: Nelson (2/3) 4', 33'

Cardiff Arms Park, Cardiff
Attendance: 4,875
Referee: Joy Neville (Ireland)

FB	15	Kayleigh Powell
RW	14	Lisa Neumann
OC	13	Hannah Jones
IC	12	Kerin Lake	(yellow card) 40' to 50'	(substituted off) 76'
LW	11	Jasmine Joyce
FH	10	Elinor Snowsill
SH	9	Keira Bevan		(substituted off) 59'
N8	8	Siwan Lillicrap (c)
OF	7	Alex Callender		(substituted off) 61'
BL	6	Alisha Butchers
RL	5	Gwen Crabb
LL	4	Natalia John		(substituted off) 43'
TP	3	Cerys Hale		(substituted off) 66'
HK	2	Carys Phillips		(substituted off) 47'
LP	1	Gwenllian Pyrs		(substituted off) 69'
Replacements:
HK	16	Kelsey Jones		(substituted on) 47'
PR	17	Cara Hope		(substituted on) 69'
PR	18	Donna Rose		(substituted on) 66'
N8	19	Sioned Harries		(substituted on) 43'
FL	20	Bethan Lewis		(substituted on) 61'
SH	21	Ffion Lewis		(substituted on) 59'
FH	22	Robyn Wilkins		(substituted on) 76'
FL	23	Sisilia Tuipulotu
Coach:
(Wales) Ioan Cunningham

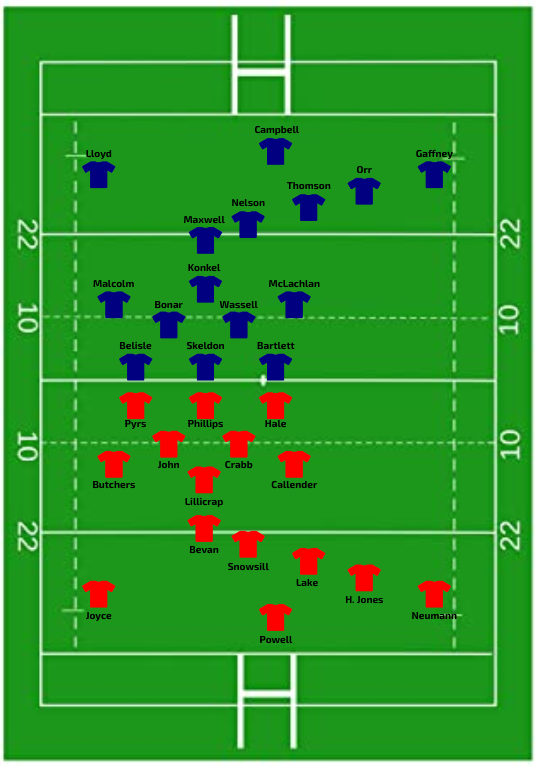

FB	15	Shona Campbell
RW	14	Rhona Lloyd
OC	13	Emma Orr		(substituted off) 76'
IC	12	Lisa Thomson
LW	11	Megan Gaffney
FH	10	Helen Nelson
SH	9	Jenny Maxwell		(substituted off) 47'
N8	8	Jade Konkel
OF	7	Evie Gallagher
BF	6	Rachel Malcolm (c)		(substituted off) 66' (substituted on) 74'
RL	5	Sarah Bonar		(substituted off) 64'
LL	4	Emma Wassell
TP	3	Christine Belisle
HK	2	Lana Skeldon
LP	1	Leah Bartlett	(yellow card) 62' to 72'
Replacements:
HK	16	Jodie Rettie
PR	17	Panashe Muzambe
PR	18	Anne Young		(substituted on) 66' (substituted off) 74'
LK	19	Lyndsay O'Donnell
LK	20	Louise McMillan		(substituted on) 64'
SH	21	Caity Mattinson		(substituted on) 47'
FH	22	Meryl Smith		(substituted on) 76'
CE	23	Coreen Grant
Coach:
(Scotland) Bryan Easson

Player of the Match:
Sioned Harries (Wales)

Assistant referees:
Nikki O'Donnell (England)
Katherine Ritchie (England)
Television match official:
Chris Assmus (Canada)

Notes:

- Emma Orr (Scotland) made her international debut.

3 April 2022
16:00 CEST (UTC+2)

Italy	0–74	England (1 BP)
	Report	Try: McKenna (2) 3' c, 74' c Thompson (3) 14' m, 41' m, 79' m Davies 20' m Brown 27' c Matthews 34' c Fleetwood 48' m Bern 51' c Sing 63' c Scarratt 67' c Con: Harrison (3/5) 4', 28', 35'; Rowland (4/7) 52', 64', 67', 75'

Stadio Sergio Lanfranchi, Parma
Attendance: 1,700
Referee: Hollie Davidson (Scotland)

FB	15	Vittoria Ostuni Minuzzi
RW	14	Aura Muzzo		(substituted off) 55'
OC	13	Michela Sillari
IC	12	Beatrice Rigoni	(yellow card) 70' to 80'
LW	11	Maria Magatti
FH	10	Veronica Madia
SH	9	Sofia Stefan		(substituted off) 55'
N8	8	Elisa Giordano (c)
OF	7	Isabella Locatelli		(substituted off) 55'
BL	6	Francesca Sberna		(substituted off) 42'
RL	5	Giordana Duca
LL	4	Sara Tounesi		(substituted off) 73'
TP	3	Lucia Gai		(substituted off) 64'
HK	2	Melissa Bettoni		(substituted off) 36'
LP	1	Gaia Maris		(substituted off) 61'
Replacements:
HK	16	Vittoria Vecchini		(substituted on) 36'
PR	17	Francesca Barro		(substituted on) 61'
PR	18	Sara Seye		(substituted on) 64'
LK	19	Valeria Fedrighi		(substituted on) 55'
FL	20	Beatrice Veronese		(substituted on) 42'
SH	21	Sara Barattin		(substituted on) 55'
CE	22	Alyssa D'Incà		(substituted on) 73'
FB	23	Manuela Furlan		(substituted on) 55'
Coach:
(Italy) Andrea Di Giandomenico

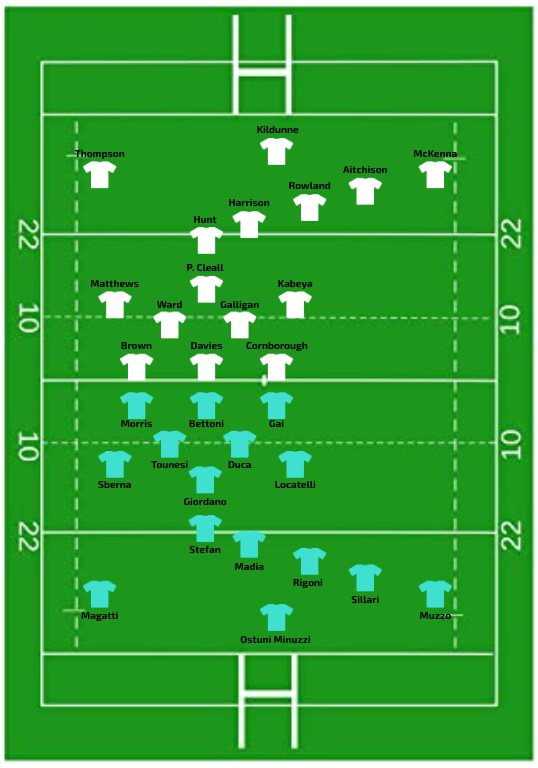

FB	15	Ellie Kildunne	(substituted off) 61'
RW	14	Lydia Thompson
OC	13	Holly Aitchison	(substituted off) 66'
IC	12	Helena Rowland
LW	11	Sarah McKenna
FH	10	Zoe Harrison
SH	9	Natasha Hunt	(substituted off) 55'
N8	8	Poppy Cleall (c)	(substituted off) 66'
OF	7	Sadia Kabeya	(substituted off) 42'
BF	6	Alex Matthews
RL	5	Abbie Ward
LL	4	Rosie Galligan
TP	3	Shaunagh Brown	(substituted off) 51'
HK	2	Lark Davies	(substituted off) 51'
LP	1	Victoria Cornborough	(substituted off) 51'
Replacements:
HK	16	Connie Powell	(substituted on) 51'
PR	17	Maud Muir	(substituted on) 51'
PR	18	Sarah Bern	(substituted on) 51'
N8	19	Sarah Hunter	(substituted on) 66'
FL	20	Victoria Fleetwood	(substituted on) 42'
SH	21	Lucy Packer	(substituted on) 55'
CE	22	Emily Scarratt	(substituted on) 66'
FB	23	Emma Sing	(substituted on) 61'
Coach:
(England) Simon Middleton

Player of the Match:
Natasha Hunt (England)

Assistant referees:
Doriane Domenjo (France)
Clara Munarini (Italy)
Television match official:
Olly Hodges (Ireland)

Notes:

- Francesca Barro (Italy) made her international debut.
- Kat Roche was originally scheduled to referee the match but was replaced by Hollie Davidson prior to kick-off. Davidson's place as an assistant referee was taken by Clara Munarini.

=== Round 3 ===
9 April 2022
16:45 GMT (UTC±00:00)

(1 BP) England	58–5	Wales
Try: Davies (2) 14' m, 44' m Ward 20' c Breach (2) 34' c, 51' m Bern 54' c Matthews 63' m Brown 70' m Scarratt 74' m Hunter 80' c Con: Harrison (4/10) 21', 35', 55', 81'	Report	Try: Jones 67' m

Kingsholm Stadium, Gloucester
Attendance: 14,689
Referee: Julianne Zussman (Canada)

FB	15	Abigail Dow	(substituted off) 13'
RW	14	Jess Breach
OC	13	Emily Scarratt
IC	12	Helena Rowland	(substituted off) 64'
LW	11	Sarah McKenna
FH	10	Zoe Harrison
SH	9	Lucy Packer
N8	8	Sarah Hunter (c)
OF	7	Marlie Packer	(substituted off) 52'
BF	6	Alex Matthews	(substituted off) 64'
RL	5	Abbie Ward
LL	4	Poppy Cleall	(substituted off) 64'
TP	3	Sarah Bern	(substituted off) 66'
HK	2	Lark Davies	(substituted off) 62'
LP	1	Victoria Cornborough	(substituted off) 62'
Replacements:
HK	16	Connie Powell	(substituted on) 62'
PR	17	Maud Muir	(substituted on) 62'
PR	18	Shaunagh Brown	(substituted on) 66'
LK	19	Rosie Galligan	(substituted on) 64'
FL	20	Victoria Fleetwood	(substituted on) 64'
SH	21	Natasha Hunt	(substituted on) 52'
CE	22	Amber Reed	(substituted on) 64'
FB	23	Ellie Kildunne	(substituted on) 13'
Coach:
(England) Simon Middleton

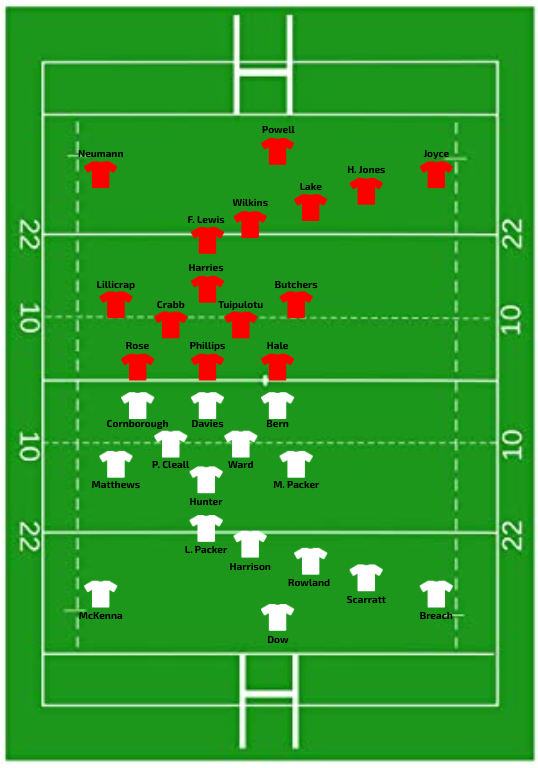

FB	15	Kayleigh Powell
RW	14	Lisa Neumann
OC	13	Hannah Jones
IC	12	Kerin Lake		(substituted off) 64'
LW	11	Jasmine Joyce
FH	10	Robyn Wilkins
SH	9	Ffion Lewis		(substituted off) 56'
N8	8	Sioned Harries		(substituted off) 62'
OF	7	Alisha Butchers		(substituted off) 52'
BF	6	Siwan Lillicrap (c)
RL	5	Gwen Crabb
LL	4	Sisilia Tuipulotu		(substituted off) 40'
TP	3	Donna Rose		(substituted off) 40'
HK	2	Carys Phillips		(substituted off) 52'
LP	1	Gwenllian Pyrs		(substituted off) 59'
Replacements:
HK	16	Kelsey Jones		(substituted on) 52'
PR	17	Cara Hope		(substituted on) 59'
PR	18	Cerys Hale		(substituted on) 40'
FL	19	Alex Callender		(substituted on) 52'
FL	20	Bethan Lewis		(substituted on) 62'
SH	21	Keira Bevan		(substituted on) 36'
FH	22	Elinor Snowsill		(substituted on) 64'
LK	23	Natalia John	(yellow card) 59' to 69'	(substituted on) 40'
Coach:
(Wales) Ioan Cunningham

Player of the Match:
Abbie Ward (England)

Touch judges:
Hollie Davidson (Scotland)
Maria Latos (Germany)
Television match official:
Matteo Liperini (Italy)

Notes:

- The crowd of 14,689 was a record for an England ticketed home game.

10 April 2022
13:00 GMT (UTC±00:00)

Scotland	8–28	France (1 BP)
Try: Rollie 68' m Pen: Nelson (1/1) 19'	Report	Try: Sansus (2) 8' c, 35' c Trémoulière 27' c Hermet 39' c Con: Trémoulière (4/4) 9', 28', 37', 40'

Scotstoun Stadium, Glasgow
Referee: Clara Munarini (Italy)

FB	15	Chloe Rollie
RW	14	Rhona Lloyd
OC	13	Emma Orr	(substituted off) 50'
IC	12	Lisa Thomson
LW	11	Megan Gaffney
FH	10	Helen Nelson	(substituted off) 78'
SH	9	Jenny Maxwell	(substituted off) 54'
N8	8	Jade Konkel	(substituted off) 54'
OF	7	Evie Gallagher
BF	6	Rachel Malcolm (c)
RL	5	Sarah Bonar
LL	4	Louise McMillan	(substituted off) 79'
TP	3	Christine Belisle	(substituted off) 78'
HK	2	Lana Skeldon	(substituted off) 78'
LP	1	Leah Bartlett	(substituted off) 57'
Replacements:
HK	16	Jodie Rettie	(substituted on) 78'
PR	17	Molly Wright	(substituted on) 57'
PR	18	Katie Dougan	(substituted on) 78'
LK	19	Lyndsay O'Donnell	(substituted on) 79'
FL	20	Rachel McLachlan	(substituted on) 54'
SH	21	Caity Mattinson	(substituted on) 54'
FH	22	Sarah Law	(substituted on) 50'
CE	23	Meryl Smith	(substituted on) 78'
Coach:
(Scotland) Bryan Easson

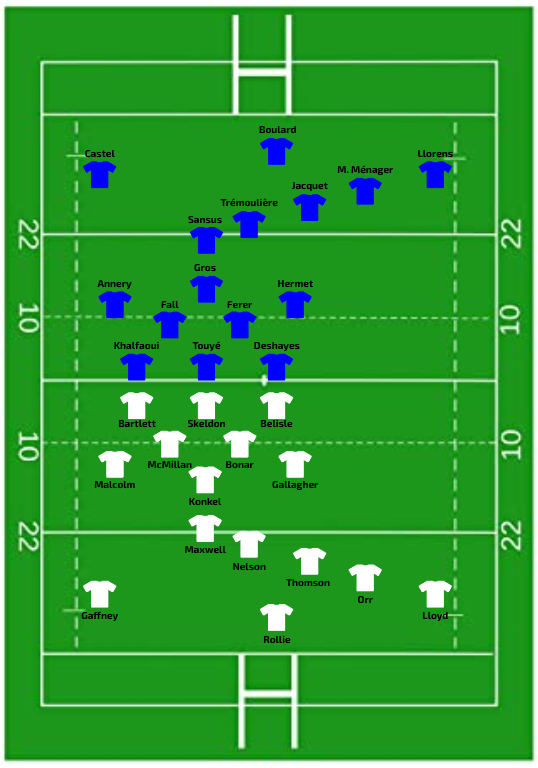

FB	15	Émilie Boulard
RW	14	Marie-Aurélie Castel		(substituted off) 73'
OC	13	Marine Ménager
IC	12	Chloé Jacquet
LW	11	Mélissande Llorens
FH	10	Jessy Trémoulière		(substituted off) 64'
SH	9	Laure Sansus		(substituted off) 40'
N8	8	Emeline Gros
OF	7	Gaëlle Hermet (c)		(substituted off) 60'
BF	6	Julie Annery	(yellow card) 64' to 74'
RL	5	Madoussou Fall		(substituted off) 50'
LL	4	Céline Ferer
TP	3	Assia Khalfaoui		(substituted off) 50'
HK	2	Laure Touyé		(substituted off) 73'
LP	1	Annaëlle Deshayes		(substituted off) 50'
Replacements:
HK	16	Célia Domain		(substituted on) 73'
PR	17	Coco Lindelauf		(substituted on) 50'
PR	18	Clara Joyeux		(substituted on) 50'
LK	19	Safi N'Diaye		(substituted on) 50'
FL	20	Romane Ménager		(substituted on) 60'
SH	21	Alexandra Chambon		(substituted on) 40'
FH	22	Morgane Peyronnet		(substituted on) 64'
CE	23	Gabrielle Vernier		(substituted on) 73'
Coach:
(France) Annick Heyraut

Player of the Match:
Jessy Trémoulière (France)

Touch judges:
Nikki O'Donnell (England)
Maria Giovanna Pacifico (Italy)
Television match official:
Ben Whitehouse (Wales)

10 April 2022
17:00 GMT (UTC±00:00)

(1 BP) Ireland	29–8	Italy
Try: Mulhall 20' m Jones 34' m Higgins 42' c Penalty try 51'; O'Dwyer 76' m Con: Cronin (1/4) 43'	Report	Try: Bettoni 71' m Pen: Rigoni (1/1) 3'

Musgrave Park, Cork
Referee: Aurélie Groizeleau (France)

FB	15	Lucy Mulhall
RW	14	Amee-Leigh Murphy Crowe		(substituted off) 63'
OC	13	Eve Higgins
IC	12	Stacey Flood
LW	11	Beibhinn Parsons		(substituted off) 59'
FH	10	Nicole Cronin
SH	9	Kathryn Dane		(substituted off) 69'
N8	8	Hannah O'Connor
OF	7	Edel McMahon
BF	6	Dorothy Wall		(substituted off) 59'
RL	5	Sam Monaghan
LL	4	Nichola Fryday (c)		(substituted off) 59'
TP	3	Christy Haney		(substituted off) 60'
HK	2	Neve Jones		(substituted off) 60'
LP	1	Linda Djougang		(substituted off) 65'
Replacements:
HK	16	Emma Hooban		(substituted on) 60'
PR	17	Chloe Pearse		(substituted on) 65'
PR	18	Katie O'Dwyer		(substituted on) 60'
LK	19	Brittany Hogan		(substituted on) 59'
FL	20	Aoife Wafer	(yellow card) 67' to 77'	(substituted on) 59'
SH	21	Aoibheann Reilly		(substituted on) 69'
FH	22	Enya Breen		(substituted on) 63'
WG	23	Aoife Doyle		(substituted on) 59'
Coach:
(Ireland) Greg McWilliams

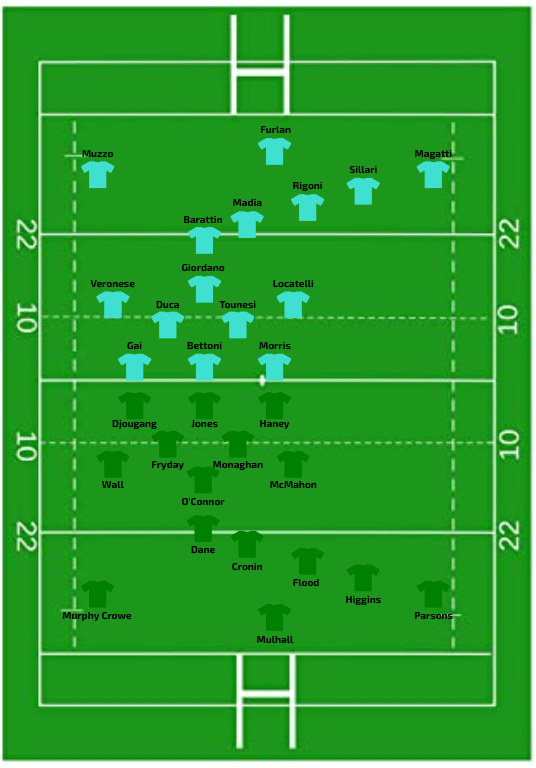

FB	15	Vittoria Ostuni Minuzzi
RW	14	Manuela Furlan (c)
OC	13	Alyssa D'Incà
IC	12	Beatrice Rigoni
LW	11	Maria Magatti
FH	10	Veronica Madia		(substituted off) 40'
SH	9	Sara Barattin
N8	8	Elisa Giordano	(yellow card) 33' to 43'
OF	7	Isabella Locatelli		(substituted off) 53'
BF	6	Beatrice Veronese
RL	5	Valeria Fedrighi
LL	4	Sara Tounesi		(substituted off) 72'
TP	3	Lucia Gai		(substituted off) 76'
HK	2	Melissa Bettoni		(substituted off) 76'
LP	1	Gaia Maris		(substituted off) 59'
Replacements:
HK	16	Vittoria Vecchini		(substituted on) 59'
PR	17	Emanuela Stecca		(substituted on) 76'
PR	18	Sara Seye		(substituted on) 76'
LK	19	Alessia Margotti		(substituted on) 72'
FL	20	Alessandra Frangipani		(substituted on) 53'
SH	21	Sofia Stefan		(substituted on) 40'
FH	22	Beatrice Capomaggi
WG	23	Federica Cipolla
Coach:
(Italy) Andrea Di Giandomenico

Player of the Match:
Sam Monaghan (Ireland)

Touch judges:
Doriane Domenjo (France)
Francesca Martin (Wales)
Television match official:
Eriz Gauzins (France)

Notes:

- Aoife Wafer (Ireland) and Alessia Margotti (Italy) made their international debuts.
- The Italian team suffered a COVID outbreak while preparing for the match and underwent the following changes:
  - Giordana Duca was replaced by Valeria Fedrighi, Michela Sillari was replaced by Alyssa D'Incà and Aura Muzzo was replaced by Manuela Furlan. Furlan was in turn replaced by Vittoria Ostuni Minuzzi.
  - On the bench Michela Merlo was replaced by Emanuela Stecca, Fedrighi was replaced by Alessia Margotti, D'Incà was replaced by Beatrice Capomaggi and Ostuni Minuzzi was replaced by Federica Cipolla.

=== Round 4 ===
22 April 2022
20:00 GMT (UTC±00:00)

Wales	5–33	France (1 BP)
Try: Harries 80' m	Report	Try: Sansus (2) 8' c, 28' c Boujard 20' c Jacquet 24' m Trémoulière 54' c Con: Trémoulière (4/5) 8', 21', 29', 55'

Cardiff Arms Park, Cardiff
Attendance: 2,794
Referee: Maggie Cogger-Orr (New Zealand)

FB	15	Kayleigh Powell			(substituted off) 64'
RW	14	Lisa Neumann
OC	13	Hannah Jones
IC	12	Robyn Wilkins
LW	11	Jasmine Joyce	(substituted off) 29'	(substituted on) 39'
FH	10	Elinor Snowsill	(substituted off) 60'
SH	9	Keira Bevan	(substituted off) 48'
N8	8	Siwan Lillicrap (c)	19' to 26'		(substituted off) 51'
OF	7	Bethan Lewis
BF	6	Alisha Butchers
RL	5	Gwen Crabb
LL	4	Natalia John
TP	3	Cerys Hale	(substituted off) 53'
HK	2	Carys Phillips	(substituted off) 60'
LP	1	Gwenllian Pyrs	26' to 36'		(substituted off) 64'
Replacements:
HK	16	Kelsey Jones	(substituted on) 60'
PR	17	Cara Hope	(substituted on) 26'	(substituted off) 36'	(substituted on) 64'
PR	18	Donna Rose	(substituted on) 53'
LK	19	Alex Callender	(substituted on) 48'
FL	20	Sioned Harries	(substituted on) 19'	(substituted off) 26'	(substituted on) 51'
SH	21	Ffion Lewis	(substituted on) 48'
CE	22	Kerin Lake	(substituted on) 60'
FB	23	Niamh Terry	(substituted on) 29'	(substituted off) 39'	(substituted on) 64'
Coach:
(Wales) Ioan Cunningham

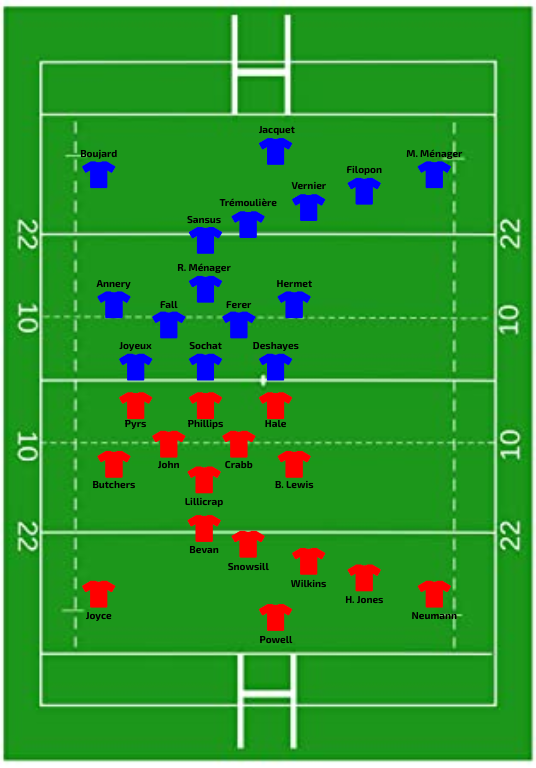

FB	15	Chloé Jacquet
RW	14	Caroline Boujard
OC	13	Maëlle Filopon
IC	12	Gabrielle Vernier	(substituted off) 58'
LW	11	Marine Ménager
FH	10	Jessy Trémoulière	(substituted off) 72'
SH	9	Laure Sansus	(substituted off) 49'
N8	8	Romane Ménager	(substituted off) 61'
OF	7	Gaëlle Hermet (c)	(substituted off) 49'
BF	6	Julie Annery
RL	5	Madoussou Fall
LL	4	Céline Ferer
TP	3	Clara Joyeux	(substituted off) 58'
HK	2	Agathe Sochat	(substituted off) 69'
LP	1	Annaëlle Deshayes	(substituted off) 58'
Replacements:
HK	16	Laure Touyé	(substituted on) 69'
PR	17	Coco Lindelauf	(substituted on) 58'
PR	18	Assia Khalfaoui	(substituted on) 58'
LK	19	Audrey Forlani	(substituted on) 49'
FL	20	Émeline Gros	(substituted on) 61'
SH	21	Alexandra Chambon	(substituted on) 49'
FH	22	Morgane Peyronnet	(substituted on) 72'
FB	23	Émilie Boulard	(substituted on) 58'
Coach:
(France) Annick Heyraut

Player of the Match:
Laure Sansus (France)

Touch judges:
Joy Neville (Ireland)
Beatrice Benvenuti (Italy)
Television match official:
Olly Hodges (Ireland)

23 April 2022
20:20 CET (UTC+1)

Italy	20–13	Scotland (1 BP)
Try: Bettoni 44' c Turani 70' c Con: Sillari (2/2) 45', 71'; Pen: Sillari (2/2) 22', 54'	Report	Try: Wassell 35' c Con: Nelson (1/1) 36'; Pen: Nelson (2/2) 13', 76'

Stadio Sergio Lanfranchi, Parma
Referee: Lauren Jenner (New Zealand)

FB	15	Manuela Furlan (c)	(substituted off) 14'	(substituted on) 23'	(substituted off) 63'
RW	14	Aura Muzzo
OC	13	Michela Sillari
IC	12	Beatrice Rigoni
LW	11	Maria Magatti
FH	10	Veronica Madia
SH	9	Sofia Stefan	(substituted off) 7'
N8	8	Ilaria Arrighetti
OF	7	Isabella Locatelli
BF	6	Beatrice Veronese	(substituted off) 58'
RL	5	Giordana Duca
LL	4	Valeria Fedrighi
TP	3	Lucia Gai
HK	2	Vittoria Vecchini	(substituted off) 61'
LP	1	Melissa Bettoni
Replacements:
HK	16	Silvia Turani	(substituted on) 61'
PR	17	Gaia Maris
PR	18	Michela Merlo
LK	19	Sara Tounesi	(substituted on) 58'
FL	20	Alessandra Frangipani
SH	21	Sara Barattin	(substituted on) 7'
CE	22	Alyssa D'Incà
FB	23	Vittoria Ostuni Minuzzi	(substituted on) 14'	(substituted off) 23'	(substituted on) 63'
Coach:
Andrea Di Giandomenico

FB	15	Chloe Rollie
RW	14	Rhona Lloyd
OC	13	Lisa Thomson
IC	12	Helen Nelson (vc)
LW	11	Shona Campbell
FH	10	Sarah Law	(substituted off) 55'
SH	9	Caity Mattinson	(substituted off) 55'
N8	8	Evie Gallagher
OF	7	Rachel McLachlan	(substituted off) 72'
BF	6	Rachel Malcolm (c)
RL	5	Sarah Bonar
LL	4	Emma Wassell
TP	3	Christine Belisle
HK	2	Lana Skeldon
LP	1	Molly Wright	(substituted off) 64'
Replacements:
HK	16	Jodie Rettie
PR	17	Leah Bartlett	(substituted on) 64'
PR	18	Katie Dougan
LK	19	Louise McMillan	(substituted on) 72'
FL	20	Anne Young
SH	21	Jenny Maxwell	(substituted on) 55'	(substituted off) 57'
FH	22	Hannah Smith	(substituted on) 55'
WG	23	Megan Gaffney	(substituted on) 57'
Coach:
Bryan Easson

Player of the Match:
Michela Sillari (Italy)

Assistant Referees:
Sara Cox (England)
Katherine Ritchie (England)
Television match official:
Ben Whitehouse (Wales)

Notes:

- Elisa Giordano was originally named at number 8 for Italy, but was replaced by Ilaria Arrighetti prior to kickoff. Arrighetti, who was originally named at openside flanker, was replaced by Isabella Locatelli. Locatelli's place on the bench was taken by Alessandra Frangipani.

24 April 2022
12:00 GMT (UTC±00:00)

(1 BP) England	69–0	Ireland
Try: Davies (2) 1' m, 44' c Bern 16' m Packer 41' c Thompson (2) 50' m, 76' c Cleall (2) 54' c, 63' c Botterman 60' c Kildunne (2) 66' c, 72' m Con: Scarratt (5/8) 42', 45', 56', 61', 65'; Harrison (2/3) 67', 77'	Report

Welford Road Stadium, Leicester
Attendance: 15,863
Referee: Amber McLachlan (Australia)

FB	15	Helena Rowland
RW	14	Lydia Thompson
OC	13	Emily Scarratt	(substituted off) 67'	(substituted on) 79'
IC	12	Holly Aitchison	(substituted off) 59'	(substituted on) 67'	(substituted off) 79'
LW	11	Jess Breach	(substituted off) 44'
FH	10	Zoe Harrison
SH	9	Leanne Infante	(substituted off) 59'
N8	8	Sarah Hunter (c)	(substituted off) 47'
OF	7	Marlie Packer
BF	6	Alex Matthews
RL	5	Abbie Ward	(substituted off) 56'
LL	4	Zoe Aldcroft
TP	3	Sarah Bern	(substituted off) 46'
HK	2	Lark Davies	(substituted off) 46'
LP	1	Vickii Cornborough	(substituted off) 46'
Replacements:
HK	16	Amy Cokayne	(substituted on) 46'
PR	17	Hannah Botterman	(substituted on) 46'
PR	18	Maud Muir	(substituted on) 46'
LK	19	Rosie Galligan	(substituted on) 56'
FL	20	Poppy Cleall	(substituted on) 47'
SH	21	Natasha Hunt	(substituted on) 59'
FH	22	Amber Reed	(substituted on) 59'
FB	23	Ellie Kildunne	(substituted on) 44'
Coach:
Simon Middleton

FB	15	Molly Scuffil-McCabe
RW	14	Aoife Doyle
OC	13	Sene Naoupu	(red card) 66'
IC	12	Enya Breen
LW	11	Eimear Considine		(substituted off) 63'
FH	10	Nicole Cronin		(substituted off) 29'
SH	9	Kathryn Dane		(substituted off) 73'
N8	8	Hannah O'Connor
OF	7	Edel McMahon
BF	6	Dorothy Wall	(yellow card) 43' to 53'	(substituted off) 65'
RL	5	Aoife McDermott		(substituted off) 50'
LL	4	Nichola Fryday (c)
TP	3	Christy Haney		(substituted off) 42'
HK	2	Neve Jones		(substituted off) 73'
LP	1	Linda Djougang		(substituted off) 73'
Replacements:
HK	16	Emma Hooban		(substituted on) 73'
PR	17	Chloe Pearse		(substituted on) 73'
PR	18	Katie O'Dwyer		(substituted on) 42'
LK	19	Grace Moore		(substituted on) 50'
FL	20	Maeve Óg O'Leary		(substituted on) 65'
SH	21	Aoibheann Reilly		(substituted on) 73'
FH	22	Michelle Claffey		(substituted on) 29'
WG	23	Niamh Byrne		(substituted on) 63'
Coach:
Greg McWilliams

Player of the Match:
Marlie Packer (England)

Assistant Referees:
Aurélie Groizeleau (France)
Doriane Domenjo (France)
Television match official:
Lee Jeffrey (New Zealand)

Notes:

- Molly Scuffil-McCabe and Niamh Byrne (both Ireland) made their international debuts.
- The attendance of 15,863 broke the record for the largest attendance at a ticketed England home game. The previous attendance record was set in Gloucester in round 3.

=== Round 5 ===
30 April 2022
12:00 GMT (UTC±00:00)

Wales	8–10	Italy
Try: Bevan 75' m Con: Wilkins (0/1); Pen: Wilkins (1/1) 70'	Report	Try: Barattin 31' c Con: Sillari (1/1) 32'; Pen: Sillari (1/1) 79'

Cardiff Arms Park, Cardiff
Referee: Amber McLachlan (Australia)

FB	15	Niamh Terry		(substituted off) 65'
RW	14	Lisa Neumann
OC	13	Hannah Jones
IC	12	Kerin Lake		(substituted off) 54'
LW	11	Jasmine Joyce
FH	10	Robyn Wilkins	(yellow card) 20' to 30'
SH	9	Ffion Lewis		(substituted off) 48'
N8	8	Sioned Harries	(yellow card) 22' to 32'
OF	7	Alex Callender		(substituted off) 65'	(substituted on) 70'
BF	6	Alisha Butchers		(substituted off) 70'
RL	5	Gwen Crabb
LL	4	Siwan Lillicrap (c)		(substituted off) 40'
TP	3	Donna Rose		(substituted off) 62'
HK	2	Kelsey Jones		(substituted off) 48'
LP	1	Cara Hope		(substituted off) 62'
Replacements:
HK	16	Carys Phillips		(substituted on) 48'
PR	17	Caryl Thomas		(substituted on) 62'
PR	18	Cerys Hale		(substituted on) 62'
LK	19	Natalia John		(substituted on) 40'
FL	20	Bethan Lewis		(substituted on) 65'
SH	21	Keira Bevan		(substituted on) 48'
FH	22	Lleucu George		(substituted on) 54'
WG	23	Kayleigh Powell		(substituted on) 65'
Coach:
Ioan Cunningham

FB	15	Manuela Furlan (c)
RW	14	Aura Muzzo
OC	13	Michela Sillari
IC	12	Beatrice Rigoni
LW	11	Maria Magatti
FH	10	Veronica Madia
SH	9	Sara Barattin
N8	8	Elisa Giordano
OF	7	Ilaria Arrighetti
BF	6	Beatrice Veronese
RL	5	Giordana Duca
LL	4	Valeria Fedrighi	(substituted off) 51'
TP	3	Lucia Gai
HK	2	Melissa Bettoni	(substituted off) 43'	(substituted on) 54'
LP	1	Silvia Turani	(substituted off) 54'
Replacements:
HK	16	Vittoria Vecchini	(substituted on) 43'
PR	17	Gaia Maris
PR	18	Sara Seye
LK	19	Sara Tounesi	(substituted on) 51'
FL	20	Isabella Locatelli
SH	21	Francesca Granzotto
CE	22	Alyssa D'Incà
FB	23	Vittoria Ostuni Minuzzi
Coach:
Andrea Di Giandomenico

Player of the Match:
Alex Callender (Wales)

Assistant referees:
Aurélie Groizeleau (France)
Maria Latos (Germany)
Television match official:
Claire Hodnett (England)

30 April 2022
15:15 CET (UTC+1)

France	12–24	England
Try: Ménager 3' c Deshaye 66' m Con: Drouin (1/2) 4'	Report	Try: Bern (2) 11' c, 25' c Ward 16' c Con: Scarratt (3/3) 12', 17', 27'; Pen: Scarratt (1/1) 59'

Stade Jean Dauger, Bayonne
Referee: Hollie Davidson (Scotland)

FB	15	Chloé Jacquet
RW	14	Caroline Boujard		(substituted off) 59'
OC	13	Maëlle Filopon	(yellow card) 58' to 68'
IC	12	Gabrielle Vernier		(substituted off) 67'
LW	11	Marine Ménager
FH	10	Caroline Drouin
SH	9	Laure Sansus		(substituted off) 78'
N8	8	Romane Ménager		(substituted off) 67'
OF	7	Gaëlle Hermet (c)
BF	6	Céline Ferer
RL	5	Audrey Forlani		(substituted off) 46'
LL	4	Madoussou Fall
TP	3	Clara Joyeux		(substituted off) 64'
HK	2	Agathe Sochat		(substituted off) 64'
LP	1	Annaëlle Deshaye		(substituted off) 72'
Replacements:
HK	16	Laure Touyé		(substituted on) 64'
PR	17	Coco Lindelauf		(substituted on) 72'
PR	18	Yllana Brosseau		(substituted on) 64'
LK	19	Julie Annery		(substituted on) 46'
FL	20	Emeline Gros		(substituted on) 67'
SH	21	Alexandra Chambon		(substituted on) 78'
FH	22	Jessy Trémoulière		(substituted on) 67'
CE	23	Emilie Boulard		(substituted on) 59'
Coach:
Annick Hayraud

FB	15	Helena Rowland
RW	14	Lydia Thompson
OC	13	Emily Scarratt (c)
IC	12	Holly Aitchison
LW	11	Jess Breach
FH	10	Zoe Harrison	(yellow card) 42' to 52'	(substituted off) 73'
SH	9	Leanne Infante		(substituted off) 59'
N8	8	Poppy Cleall		(substituted off) 52'
OF	7	Marlie Packer
BF	6	Alex Matthews		(substituted off) 78'
RL	5	Abbie Ward
LL	4	Zoe Aldcroft
TP	3	Sarah Bern		(substituted off) 64'
HK	2	Lark Davies		(substituted off) 57'
LP	1	Vickii Cornborough		(substituted off) 57'
Replacements:
HK	16	Amy Cokayne		(substituted on) 57'
PR	17	Hannah Botterman		(substituted on) 57'
PR	18	Maud Muir		(substituted on) 64'
LK	19	Rosie Galligan		(substituted on) 52'
FL	20	Sarah Beckett		(substituted on) 78'
FL	21	Sadia Kabeya
SH	22	Natasha Hunt		(substituted on) 59'
FB	23	Ellie Kildunne		(substituted on) 73'
Coach:
Simon Middleton

Player of the Match:
Lark Davies (England)

Assistant Referees:
Joy Neville (Ireland)
Maria Giovanna Pacifico (Italy)
Television match official:
Lee Jeffrey (New Zealand)

Notes:

- With this win England won their 18th Women's Six Nations title and their 16th grand slam.
- This was England's 23rd consecutive win, tying their own record for the most consecutive wins by a senior international side.

30 April 2022
20:00 GMT (UTC±00:00)

Ireland	15–14	Scotland
Try: Jones 38' m Breen 80+3' c Con: Breen (1/2) 80+4'; Pen: O'Connor (1/2) 15'	Report	Try: Gallagher; Con: Nelson (0/1); Pen: Nelson (3/3) 52', 58', 62'

Kingspan Stadium, Belfast
Referee: Maggie Cogger-Orr (New Zealand)

FB	15	Vicky Irwin
RW	14	Aoife Doyle
OC	13	Sene Naoupu
IC	12	Enya Breen
LW	11	Molly Scuffil-McCabe
FH	10	Nikki Caughey	(substituted off) 59'
SH	9	Kathryn Dane	(substituted off) 75'
N8	8	Hannah O'Connor
OF	7	Edel McMahon	(substituted off) 65'
BF	6	Dorothy Wall	(substituted off) 65'
RL	5	Sam Monaghan
LL	4	Nichola Fryday (c)
TP	3	Christy Haney	(substituted off) 59'
HK	2	Neve Jones
LP	1	Linda Djougang
Replacements:
HK	16	Emma Hooban
PR	17	Chloe Pearse
PR	18	Katie O'Dwyer	(substituted on) 59'
LK	19	Aoife McDermott
FL	20	Grace Moore	(substituted on) 65'
FL	21	Maeve Óg O'Leary	(substituted on) 65'
SH	22	Ailsa Hughes	(substituted on) 75'
WG	23	Michelle Claffey	(substituted on) 59'
Coach:
Greg McWilliams

FB	15	Chloe Rollie
RW	14	Rhona Lloyd
OC	13	Lisa Thomson
IC	12	Helen Nelson
LW	11	Shona Campbell	(substituted off) 57'
FH	10	Sarah Law	(substituted off) 57'
SH	9	Caity Mattinson
N8	8	Evie Gallagher
OF	7	Rachel McLachlan	(substituted off) 62'
BF	6	Rachel Malcolm (c)
RL	5	Sarah Bonar
LL	4	Emma Wassell
TP	3	Christine Belisle
HK	2	Lana Skeldon
LP	1	Molly Wright	(substituted off) 64'
Replacements:
HK	16	Jodie Rettie
PR	17	Leah Bartlett	(substituted on) 64'
PR	18	Katie Dougan
LK	19	Louise McMillan	(substituted on) 62'
FL	20	Eva Donaldson
SH	21	Mairi McDonald
FH	22	Emma Orr	(substituted on) 57'
WG	23	Megan Gaffney	(substituted on) 57'
Coach:
Bryan Easson

Player of the Match:
Neve Jones (Ireland)

Assistant Referees:
Clara Munarini (Italy)
Francesca Martin (Wales)
Television match official:
Ian Tempest (England)

Notes:

- Vicky Irwin (Ireland) made her international debut.

== Player statistics ==
=== Most points ===
Pos	Name	Team	Pts
1	Emily Scarratt	England	39
2	Jessy Trémoulière	France	32
3	Laure Sansus	France	30
4	Helen Nelson	Scotland	26
5	Lark Davies	England	25
5	Sarah Bern	England	25
5	Lydia Thompson	England	25
8	Michela Sillari	Italy	21
9	Marlie Packer	England	20
9	Caroline Drouin	France	20

=== Most tries ===
Pos	Name	Team	Tries
1	Laure Sansus	France	6
2	Lark Davies	England	5
2	Sarah Bern	England	5
2	Lydia Thompson	England	5
5	Marlie Packer	England	4
6	Poppy Cleall	England	3
6	Abbie Ward	England	3
8	18 players		2

== Broadcast ==
Country	Broadcaster
United Kingdom	BBC Sport; S4C
France	France TV
Republic of Ireland	RTÉ; Virgin Media Television
Italy	Sky Sport Italia
