= List of Ireland women's national rugby union players =

List of Ireland women's national rugby union players is a list of women who have played for the Ireland national rugby union team, based on the list published by the IRFU.

Note the list only includes women who have played in a Test match which only includes the matches listed in this page List of recognised Ireland test matches

denotes players currently active at national level.

Name	Number	Opponent	Date of debut	Caps
Cath Burgess	1	Scotland	14 February 1993	
Kim Donohoe	2	Scotland	14 February 1993	
Trina Watt (Edgar)	3	Scotland	14 February 1993	
Zoe Fordham	4	Scotland	14 February 1993	
Jill Henderson	5	Scotland	14 February 1993	
Kathryn Hennessey	6	Scotland	14 February 1993	
Clare Hoppe	7	Scotland	14 February 1993	
Therese Kennedy	8	Scotland	14 February 1993	
Ciara McNaughton	9	Scotland	14 February 1993	
Joanne Moore	10	Scotland	14 February 1993	
Cath Mullalley	11	Scotland	14 February 1993	
Anne Parsons	12	Scotland	14 February 1993	
Aoife Rodgers	13	Scotland	14 February 1993	
Sally Roycroft	14	Scotland	14 February 1993	
Tanya Waters	15	Scotland	14 February 1993	
Deirdre Fitzgerald	16	Scotland	14 February 1993	
Niki Ordman	17	Scotland	14 February 1993	
Frances Doherty	18	Scotland	13 February 1994	
Siobhán Doherty	19	Scotland	13 February 1994	
Corrina Dwan	20	Scotland	13 February 1994	
Vicky McDonnell	21	Scotland	13 February 1994	
Diane Nixon	22	Scotland	13 February 1994	
Jill Scott	23	Scotland	13 February 1994	
Raeltine Shrieves	24	Scotland	13 February 1994	
Fiona Steed	25	Scotland	13 February 1994	62
Kate Abernethy	26	Scotland	13 February 1994	
Angie Brew	27	Scotland	13 February 1994	
Jacinta Gibbons (Hanley)	28	Scotland	13 February 1994	
Paula Keane	29	Scotland	13 February 1994	
Clare Wall	30	Scotland	13 February 1994	
Deborah Byrne	31	Wales	6 March 1994	
Rachel Meates	32	Scottish Students	13 April 1994	
Elaine Collins	33	France	15 April 1994	
Lorraine Noade	34	United States	17 April 1994	
Kath Buckley	35		1993-94	
Máire Kerrin	36		1994-95	
Ruth McKeown	37		1994-95	
Louise Monahan	38		1994-95	
Carole Ann Byrne	39		1994-95	
Ciara Downes	40		1994-95	
Joanne Dwyer	41		1994-95	
Nicki Milne	42		1994-95	
Therese Cosgrave	43		1995-96	
Clara Heaton	44		1995-96	
Melanie Nash	45		1995-96	
Moyna Richey	46		1995-96	
Nessa Campbell	47		1995-96	
Joan Whiteside	48		1995-96	
Fiona McNicholas	49		1995-96	
Marie Myles	50		1995-96	
Deborah Campbell	51		1996-97	
Stephanie Dowling	52		1996-97	
Mary Grehan	53		1996-97	
Joss Hanrahan	54		1996-97	
Jackie McCarthy-O'Brien	55		1996-97	
Helen Siwek	56		1996-97	
Rachel Currie	57		1996-97	
Joy Sparkes	58		1996-97	
Jacqui Horan	59		1996-97	
Laura Nicholl	60		1996-97	
Siobhán O'Donovan	61		1996-97	
Rachel Reid	62		1996-97	
Marie Hayes	63		1996-97	
Sinead Cosgrave	64		1997-98	
Cath Evans	65		1997-98	
Olivia Brown	66		1997-98	
Fiona Devaney	67		1997-98	
Jean O'Gorman	68		1997-98	
Sue Ramsbottom	69		1997-98	3
Niamh Collins	70		1997-98	
Fiona Neary	71		1997-98	
Aisling Dillon	72		1997-98	
Maura Coulter	73		1997-98	
Suzanne Fleming	74		1997-98	
Anne-Marie McAllister	75		1997-98	
Joy Moore	76		1997-98	
Gráinne Cross	77		1997-98	
Caroline Reid	78		1997-98	
Toni Brennan	79		1998-99	
Mary O'Loughlin	80		1998-99	
Judith Wilson	81		1998-99	
Leonie O'Callaghan	82		1998-99	
Emma Jeffreys	83		1998-99	
Rose Gallagher	84		1998-99	
Carmel Murphy	85		1998-99	
Rochelle Howard	86		1998-99	
Morag Magowan	87		1998-99	
Ruth Scott	88		1998-99	
Aileen Galvin	89		1998-99	
Orla Lacey	90		1998-99	
Sarahjane Bolton	91		1999-2000	
Rachel Boyd	92		1999-2000	
Magali Dolo	93		1999-2000	
Elimar Flynn	94		1999-2000	
Rene Jackson	95		1999-2000	
Celine Quinn	96		1999-2000	
Edel Cohen	97		2000-01	
Joleen Morton	98		2000-01	
Jennifer O'Leary	99		2000-01	
Yvonne Comer	100		2000-01	
Rosie Foley	101		2000-01	
Bridget Montgomery	102		2000-01	
Karen McCarthy	103		2000-01	
Patrique Kelly	104		2000-01	
Jean Lonergan	105		2000-01	
Karen Eagleson	106		2000-01	
Germaine Healy	107		2001-02	
Louise Beamish	108		2001-02	
Maeve Quirke	109		2001-02	
Rachel Tucker	110		2001-02	
Gillian McAllister	111		2001-02	
Eryka Wessell	112	England	17 February 2002	
Lynne Cantwell	113	England	17 February 2002	78
Joy Neville	114	Scotland	15 February 2003	70
Jo O'Sullivan	115	Scotland	15 February 2003	
Amanda Greensmith	116	Scotland	15 February 2003	
Jen Leacy	117	Scotland	15 February 2003	
Lesley Coulter	118	Scotland	15 February 2003	
Nuala Ni Chadhain	119	Scotland	15 February 2003	
Fiona Coghlan	120	Scotland	15 February 2003	85
Serena Sterling	121	France	9 March 2003	
Lynda Kelly	122	Wales	21 March 2003	
Tania Rosser	123	Wales	21 March 2003	58
Eimear O'Sullivan	124	Wales	21 March 2003	
Denise Tracey	125	Wales	21 March 2003	
Manuela McCarthy	126	Wales	21 March 2003	
Emma Stanley	127	Japan	14 November 2004	
Marie Barrett	128	Spain	5 February 2005	
Orla Brennan	129	Spain	5 February 2005	
Grace Davitt	130	Spain	5 February 2005	
Caroline Mahon	131	USA	25 January 2006	
Sinead Ryan	132	USA	25 January 2006	
Laura Guest	133	Spain	4 February 2006	39
Yvonne Nolan	134	Spain	4 February 2006	
Jeannette Feighery	135	Canada	26 April 2006	
Christine Robb	136		2005-06	
Shannon Houston	137	France	31 August 2006	
Mairead Kelly	138	South Africa	8 September 2006	
Jess Limbert	139	Wales	3 February 2007	
Debbie Clarke	140	Wales	3 February 2007	
Nicole Fitzgerald	141	England	25 February 2007	
Gillian Bourke	142	Italy	1 February 2008	51
Amy Davis	143	Italy	1 February 2008	
Louise Austin	144	Italy	1 February 2008	
Niamh Briggs	145	Italy	1 February 2008	57+
Kate O'Loughlin	146	Italy	1 February 2008	
Emer McManamly	147	Spain	17 May 2008	
Jackie Shiels	148	England	20 May 2008	6
Helen Brosnan	149	England	20 May 2008	
Carol Staunton	150	England	20 May 2008	
Chris Fanning	151		2008-09	
Paula O'Connor	152		2008-09	
Lauren Day	153	Scotland	13 March 2009	15
Helen Jones	154	Scotland	13 March 2009	
Claire Molloy	155	France	6 February 2009	70
Alison Miller	156	Italy	5 February 2010	
Marie Louise Reilly	157	Italy	5 February 2010	54
Nora Stapleton	158	Italy	5 February 2010	50
Eliza Downey	159	Italy	5 February 2010	
Niamh Kavanagh	160	Wales	13 March 2011	15
Geraldine Rea	161	Italy	6 February 2011	
Heather O'Brien	162	Italy	6 February 2011	
Larissa Muldoon	163	Italy	6 February 2011	48
Gill Nolan	164	Italy	6 February 2011	
Deirdre O'Brien	165	Italy	6 February 2011	
Stacey-Lea Kennedy	166	Italy	6 February 2011	
Ailis Egan	167	Wales	13 March 2011	46
Ashleigh Baxter	168	Wales	3 February 2012	
Sophie Spence	169	Wales	3 February 2012	36
Paula Fitzpatrick	170	Wales	3 February 2012	
Siobhan Fleming	171		2011-12	15
Nikki Caughey	172	Wales	3 February 2012	
Jenny Murphy	173	France	11 February 2012	
Ruth O'Reilly	174	Wales	3 February 2012	16
Leigh Dargan	175	England	9 February 2013	
Fiona Hayes	176	England	9 February 2013	15
Hannah Casey	177	Scotland	31 January 2013	8
Orla Fitzsimons	178	Scotland	31 January 2013	9
Kerrie-Ann Craddock	179	Scotland	31 January 2013	6
Sharon Lynch	180	USA	1 August 2014	3
Vicki McGinn	181	USA	1 August 2014	1
Hannah Tyrrell	182	Italy	6 February 2015	19
Katie Fitzhenry	183	Italy	6 February 2015	14
Katie Norris	184	Italy	6 February 2015	8
Sene Naoupu	185	Italy	6 February 2015	40
Sarah Mimnagh	186	Italy	6 February 2015	8
Fiona O'Brien	187	Italy	6 February 2015	4
Aoife Doyle	188	France	13 February 2015	17
Elaine Anthony	189	Italy	13 March 2016	4
Ciara Cooney	190	Wales	6 February 2016	21
Mairead Coyne	191	Wales	6 February 2016	7
Jeamie Deacon	192	England	14 November 2015	9
Áine Donnelly	193	Wales	6 February 2016	4
Cliodhna Moloney	194	England	14 November 2015	50
Mary Healy	195	Wales	6 February 2016	14
Lindsay Peat	196	England	14 November 2015	33
Fiona Reidy	197	Wales	6 February 2016	20
Zoe Grattage	198	Wales	6 February 2016	5
Elise O'Byrne-White	199	Wales	6 February 2016	3
Ciara Griffin	200	Wales	6 February 2016	35
Liz Burke	201	Italy	13 March 2016	1
Kim Flood	202	Italy	13 March 2016	10
Claire McLaughlin	203	Italy	13 March 2016	16
Nicole Fowley	204	England	13 November 2016	16
Leah Lyons	205	England	13 November 2016	29
Chloe Pearse	206	England	13 November 2016	2
Anna Caplice	207	Canada	19 November 2016	14
Nichola Fryday	206	Canada	19 November 2016	18
Ailsa Hughes	209	Scotland	3 February 2017	12
Eimear Considine	210	Scotland	3 February 2017	18
Jennie Finlay	211	Scotland	3 February 2017	2
Ciara O'Connor	212	Scotland	3 February 2017	12
Ilse van Staden	213	Scotland	3 February 2017	6
Nicole Cronin	214	Australia	9 August 2017	17
Louise Galvin	215	France	26 February 2017	1
Megan Williams	216	France	3 February 2018	18
Laura Feely	217	France	3 February 2018	19
Michelle Claffey	218	Italy	3 February 2018	14
Edel McMahon	219	Italy	3 February 2018	36
Aoife McDermott	220	Wales	25 February 2018	19
Lauren Delany	221	USA	18 November 2018	22
Laura Sheehan	222	USA	18 November 2018	4
Emma Hooban	223	USA	18 November 2018	8
Béibhinn Parsons	224	USA	18 November 2018	40
Juliet Short	225	England	24 November 2018	4
Ellen	226	England	24 November 2018	7
Kathryn Dane	227	England	24 November 2018	14
Linda Djougang	228	England	1 February 2019	60
Anne-Marie O'Hora	229	England	1 February 2019	1
Claire Boles	230	Scotland	8 February 2019	8
Deirbhile Nic a Bháird	231	Scotland	8 February 2019	11
Enya Breen	232	France	9 March 2019	33
Judy Bobbett	233	Wales	10 November 2019	3
Hannah O'Connor	234	Wales	10 November 2019	20
Victoria Dabanovich-O'Mahony	235	Wales	10 November 2019	3
Niamh Ni Dhroma	236	Wales	10 November 2019	1
Dorothy Wall	237	Wales	10 November 2019	44
Claire Keohane	238	Wales	10 November 2019	3
Brittany Hogan	239	Italy	24 October 2020	45
Neve Jones	240	Italy	24 October 2020	51
Katie O'Dwyer	241	Italy	24 October 2020	12
Eve Higgins	242	Wales	10 April 2021	39
Stacey Flood	243	Wales	10 April 2021	24
Emily Lane	244	Wales	10 April 2021	22
Amee-Leigh Costigan	245	France	17 April 2021	23
Grace Moore	246	Italy	24 April 2021	28
Lucy Mulhall	247	Spain	13 September 2021	4
Sam Monaghan	248	Spain	13 September 2021	31
Maeve Óg O'Leary	249	USA	12 November 2021	5
Shannon Touhey	250	Japan	20 November 2021	1
Aoibheann Reilly	251	Wales	26 March 2022	19
Anna McGann	252	Wales	26 March 2022	20
Christy Haney	253	France	2 April 2022	24
Aoife Wafer	254	Italy	10 April 2022	16
Molly Scuffil-McCabe	255	England	24 April 2022	26
Niamh Byrne	256	England	24 April 2022	1
Vicky Irwin	257	Scotland	30 April 2022	6
Natasja Behan	258	Japan	20 August 2022	10
Aoife Dalton	259	Japan	20 August 2022	30
Méabh Deely	260	Japan	20 August 2022	14
Dannah O'Brien	261	Japan	20 August 2022	33
Taryn Schutzler	262	Japan	20 August 2022	2
Leah Tarpey	263	Japan	20 August 2022	5
Jo Brown	264	Japan	20 August 2022	3
Jess Keating	265	Japan	20 August 2022	1
Emma Tilly	266	Japan	20 August 2022	1
Sadhbh McGrath	267	Wales	25 March 2023	26
Niamh O'Dowd	268	Wales	25 March 2023	25
Kathryn Buggy	269	France	1 April 2023	4
Ciara Nielson	270	France	1 April 2023	5
Emma Swords	271	France	1 April 2023	1
Eimear Corri-Fallon	272	Kazakhstan	13 January 2023	10
Megan Collis	273	Kazakhstan	13 January 2023	1
Sarah Delaney	274	Kazakhstan	13 January 2023	3
Fiona Tuite	275	Colombia	21 October 2023	30
Clara Barrett	276	Colombia	21 October 2023	1
Katie Corrigan	277	Italy	31 March 2024	5
Shannon Ikahihifo	278	Wales	13 April 2024	3
Ruth Campbell	279	Australia	14 September 2024	17
Vicky Elmes Kinlan	280	Australia	14 September 2024	4
Erin King	281	Australia	14 September 2024	7
Siobhán McCarthy	282	Australia	14 September 2024	11
Andrea Stock	283	Canada	5 October 2024	2
Aoife Corey	284	Scotland	26 April 2025	1
Jane Clohessy	285	Scotland	26 April 2025	19
Ivana Kiripati	286	Scotland	2 August 2025	2
Nancy McGillivray	287	Scotland	2 August 2025	4
Ailish Quinn	288	Scotland	2 August 2025	1
Ellena Perry	289	Canada	9 August 2025	9
Eilis Cahill	290	England	11 April 2026	7
Katie Whelan	291	Italy	18 April 2026	2
Robyn O'Connor	292	Italy	18 April 2026	6
Niamh Gallagher	293	Scotland	17 May 2026	5
Jemima Adams-Verling	295	USA	20 September 2026	3
Beth Buttimer	294	Japan	27 September 2026	3
Sophie Barrett	296	Japan	3 October 2026	2
Kate Jordan	297	Japan	3 October 2026	1
Alana McInerney	298	Japan	3 October 2026	1
