= Grattage (disambiguation) =

Grattage is a technique in surrealist painting.

Grattage may also refer to:

- Zoe Grattage, an Ireland women's national rugby union player
- Norman Arthur Eric Grattage MBE, an engineer honoured in the 1965 New Year Honours
