= Fowley =

Fowley is a surname. Notable people with the surname include:

== People ==
- Douglas Fowley (1911–1998), American actor
- Kim Fowley (1939–2015), American record producer, singer, songwriter and musician
- Nicole Fowley, an Irish rugby player

== Characters ==
- Diana Fowley, a character from The X-files
