= Clara Joyeux =

France international rugby union player

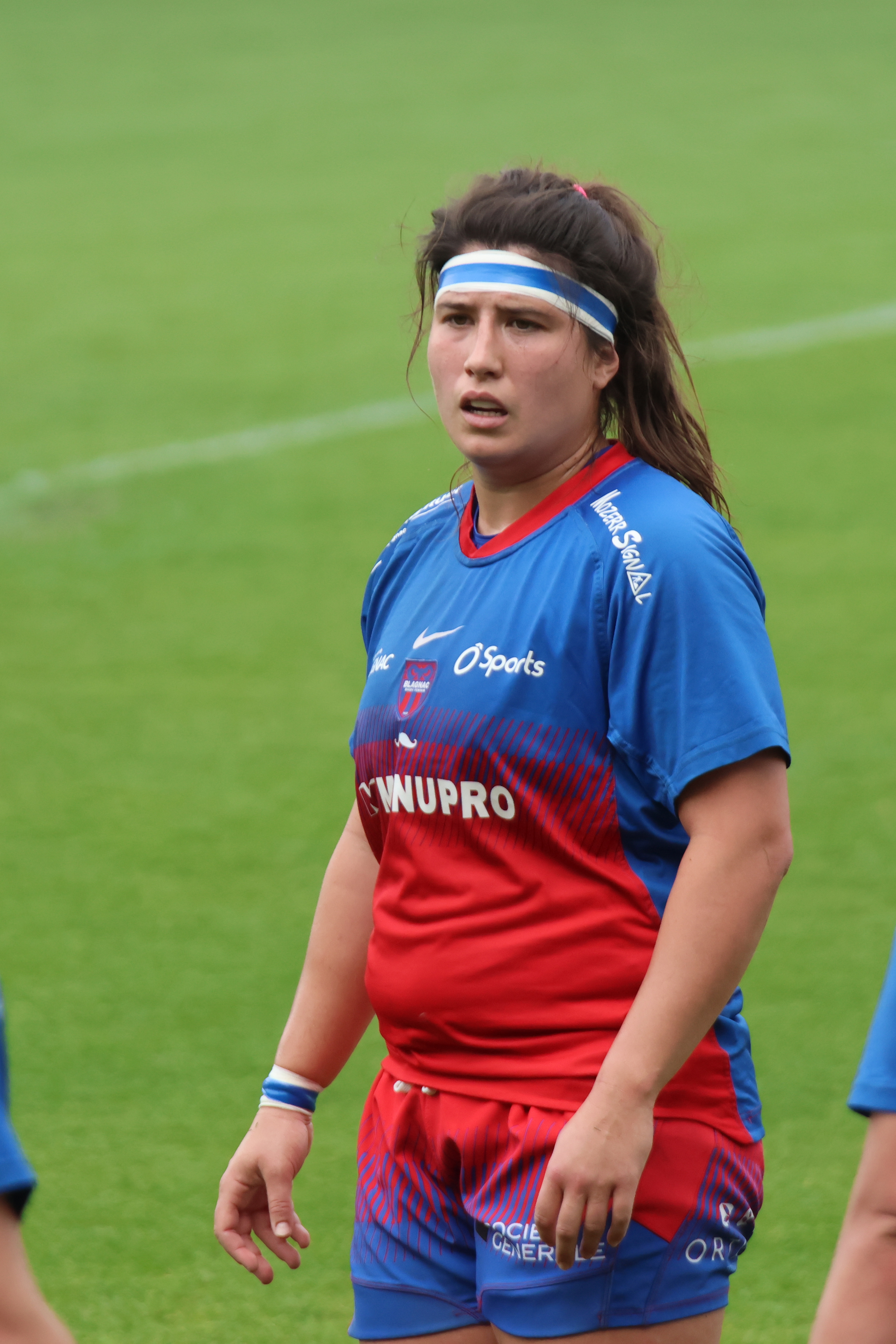
- Born: 10 January 1998 (age 28)
- Height: 1.73 m (5 ft 8 in)
- Weight: 89 kg (196 lb)

Rugby union career
- Position: Prop
Senior career
| Years | Team | Apps | (Points) |
| 2016–2017 | Limoges | | (0) |
| 2017– | Blagnac SCR | | (0) |
International career
| Years | Team | Apps | (Points) |
| 2019– | France | 47 | (0) |

Clara Joyeux (born 10 January 1998) is a French international rugby union player. She competed at the 2019 Women's Rugby Super Series and at the 2020, 2021, and 2022 Women's Six Nations Championship's. She also competed at the 2021 Rugby World Cup in New Zealand.

== Career ==
Joyeux studied at the Garenne college in Gramat; from 2008 to 2015, she played with the JS Gramat club, 4,

Spotted by CA Brive, she competed with Les Vaseix agricultural high school in Limoges, which won the French high school championship.

She then played with the Limoges, then was spotted by the national coaches during an internship at the National Rugby Center in May 2016.

She was selected in 2017 for the under 20 France national team, for a World Cup training course. In 2017, she joined Blagnac SCR.

In November 2018, she was one of the first 24 French rugby union players to sign a half-time federal contract. Her contract is extended for the 2019–20 season.She had her first cap for the French rugby union team on 2 February 2019 against Wales for the first day of the 2019 Women's Six Nations Tournament.

In 2022, she was selected to compete in the Rugby World Cup. She was named in France's squad for the 2023 Women's Six Nations Championship.

She was named in the side for the 2025 Women's Six Nations Championship on 7 March.
