= Gwen Crabb =

Wales international rugby union footballer

- Born: 28 July 1999 (age 27) Swansea, South Wales
- Height: 170 cm (5 ft 7 in)
- Weight: 77.3 kg (170 lb; 12 st 2 lb)
- School: Morriston Comprehensive School
- University: Cardiff Metropolitan University

Rugby union career
- Position: Second row
- Current team: Gloucester-Hartpury
Senior career
Years	Team	Apps	(Points)
2020–present	Gloucester-Hartpury		(0)
2019–2020	Worcester Warriors		(0)
International career
Years	Team	Apps	(Points)
2018–present	Wales	39	(15)
- Correct as of 24 September 2025

Gwen Crabb (born 28 June 1999) is a Welsh Rugby Union player. She plays second row for Wales internationally and for Gloucester-Hartpury in the Premier 15s.

== Rugby career ==
=== Club career ===
Crabb began her sporting career as a goalkeeper in football – her main sports pursuit from the age of four until her mid-teens. Her skills were such that she was even selected for the Wales under-17s squad.

In an interview with WRU.Wales, she explained her decision to switch sports:

"As soon as I started playing rugby at about 15, it was a no-brainer. I really enjoyed the family atmosphere and ethos in rugby. And I can’t lie – I really enjoyed the physical contact, too. As a goalkeeper, the handling skills transferred really nicely across to rugby – spatial awareness and things like that. The line-out quickly became my thing as well.”

Crabb then played for both Pencoed Phoenix under-18s and Hendy under-18s before joining Worcester Warriors in 2019. In June 2020, she signed with her current club, Gloucester-Hartpury.

=== International career ===
Following a year out due to a knee injury, Crabb made her international debut against Hong Kong in the 2018 autumn series held at Cardiff Arm's Park. She has since represented the Wales women's squad at each subsequent Six Nations Championship, and has won 22 caps to date. She competed at the 2021 Six Nations Championship.

Crabb is one of 31 Welsh players who have received full-time contracts as of January 2022. She was named in Wales 2022 Six Nations squad. She was in the starting line-up in every match of the Six Nations tournament.

Crabb scored the only try in Wales warm-up match against England ahead of the World Cup. She was selected in Wales squad for the 2021 Rugby World Cup in New Zealand.

She was named in the Welsh side for the 2025 Six Nations Championship in March. On 11 August 2025, she was named in the Welsh squad to the Women's Rugby World Cup in England.

== Personal life ==
Born in Swansea, Crabb attended Ynystawe Primary School and Morriston Comprehensive before joining the Llandarcy Academy of Sport to develop her rugby skills. She then moved to Cardiff Metropolitan University in 2018 to study strength conditioning, rehabilitation and massage. She balances her role as personal trainer and online coach alongside her rugby career.
