= Coco Lindelauf =

French rugby player (born 2001)

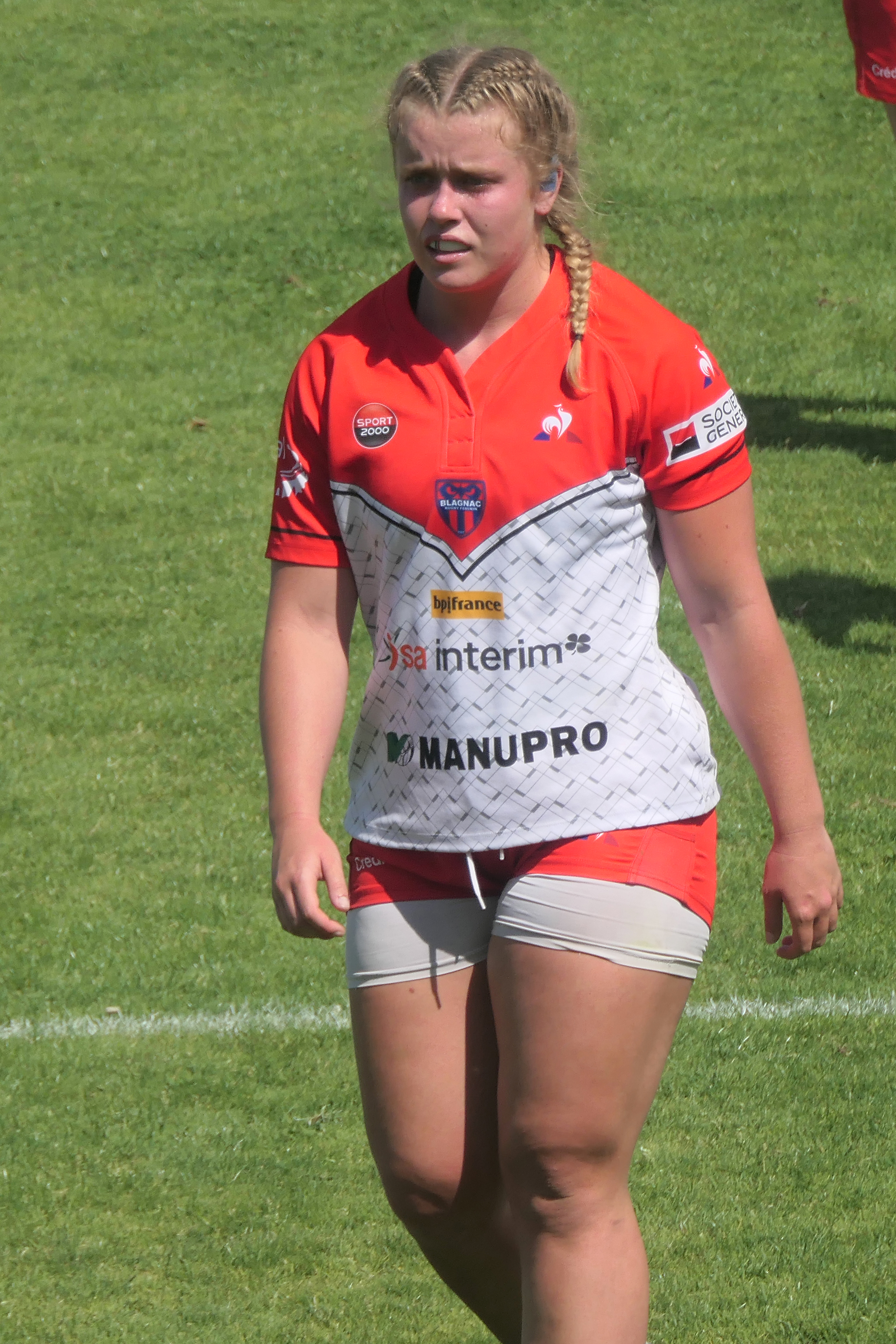
- Lindelauf in 2022
- Born: 17 January 2001 (age 25)
- Height: 172 cm (5 ft 8 in)

Rugby union career
- Position: Prop
Senior career
Years	Team	Apps	(Points)
- Blagnac SCR
2026-	Leicester Tigers Women		
International career
Years	Team	Apps	(Points)
2021-	France		

Coco Lindelauf (born 17 January 2001) is a French rugby union player who plays for Leicester Tigers Women and the France women's national rugby union team.

== Personal life ==
She grew up near Gruissan in the Aude department. She is of Dutch heritage but her parents, Micky and Roger, and her younger sister Roxy, settled in Southern France to start a bed and breakfast business when Coco was 6 years old.

== Career ==
Having started as a No. 8, she played second row before settling as a prop forward when she arrived at senior rugby at Blagnac. She made her debut for the France national team in November 2021 against South Africa in Vannes. She was named in France's team for the delayed 2021 Rugby World Cup in New Zealand (eventually held in October-November 2022, due to the COVID-19 pandemic).

In June 2026, Lindelauf signed for English side Leicester Tigers Women.
