= Emma Orr =

Scotland international rugby union player

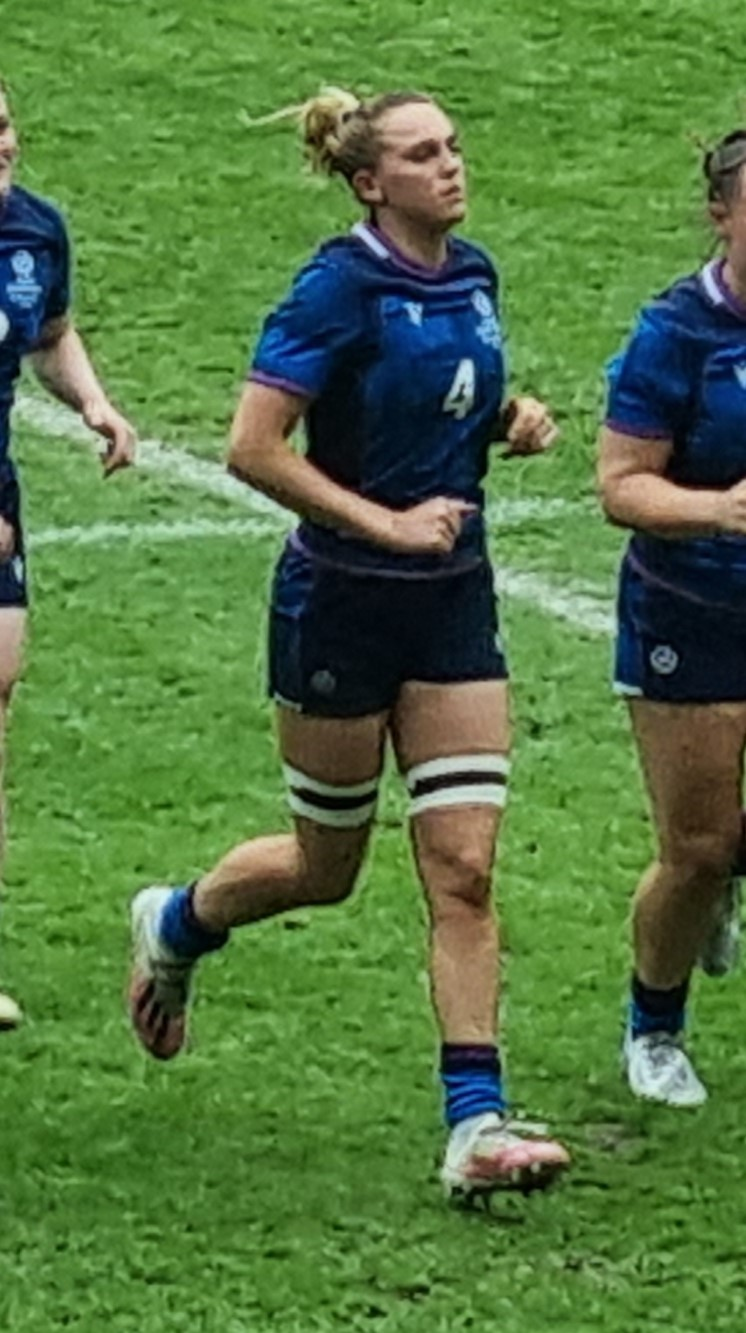
- Born: 6 April 2003 (age 23) Wishaw, Scotland
- Height: 174 cm (5 ft 9 in)
- Weight: 76 kg (168 lb; 12 st 0 lb)

Rugby union career
- Position: Stand off / Centre
- Current team: Bristol Bears
Senior career
Years	Team	Apps	(Points)
	Heriots Blues Women		(0)
Provincial / State sides
Years	Team	Apps	(Points)
2023	Edinburgh Rugby Women	2	(10)
International career
Years	Team	Apps	(Points)
2022–	Scotland	34	(50)

Emma Orr (born 6 April 2003) is a Scottish Rugby Union player from Biggar who plays for the Scotland women's national rugby union team and the Scotland women's national rugby sevens team. Orr currently plays club rugby for Bristol Bears Women in the PWR.

== Club career ==
=== Youth career ===
Emma Orr first started playing rugby while she was in Primary Four at Walston Primary School.

Orr first joined Biggar RFC at the U15s. Orr's family are widely involved in the team. Orr's father was the club president, and her sister, brothers, and cousin have also represented the club.

In 2017 Orr won the U15 Girls’ Youth Cup at Murrayfield Stadium.

=== Senior career ===
In 2022, she played in the Biggar team which won the National Plate.

Post World Cup, Orr joined Heriots Blues Women who compete in the Scottish Premiership.

Orr moved to Bristol Bears ahead of the 2024/25 season.

== International career ==
Orr made her Scotland sevens debut at the age of 18 in the Rugby Europe Championship in Lisbon in June 2021, in which Scotland finished 5th. Still aged 18, Orr made her Scotland women's team debut against Wales during the 2022 Women's Six Nations, winning three caps during the tournament. She was selected to represent the Scotland women's 7s team at the Toulouse leg of the World Sevens Series in May 2022 and for the squad for the 2022 Commonwealth Games in Birmingham. In December 2022 she was awarded a professional contract by Scottish Rugby.

She was named in Scotland's squad for the 2025 Six Nations Championship in March. She was also selected in the Scottish side for the 2025 Women's Rugby World Cup.
