= Chloé Jacquet =

French rugby union player

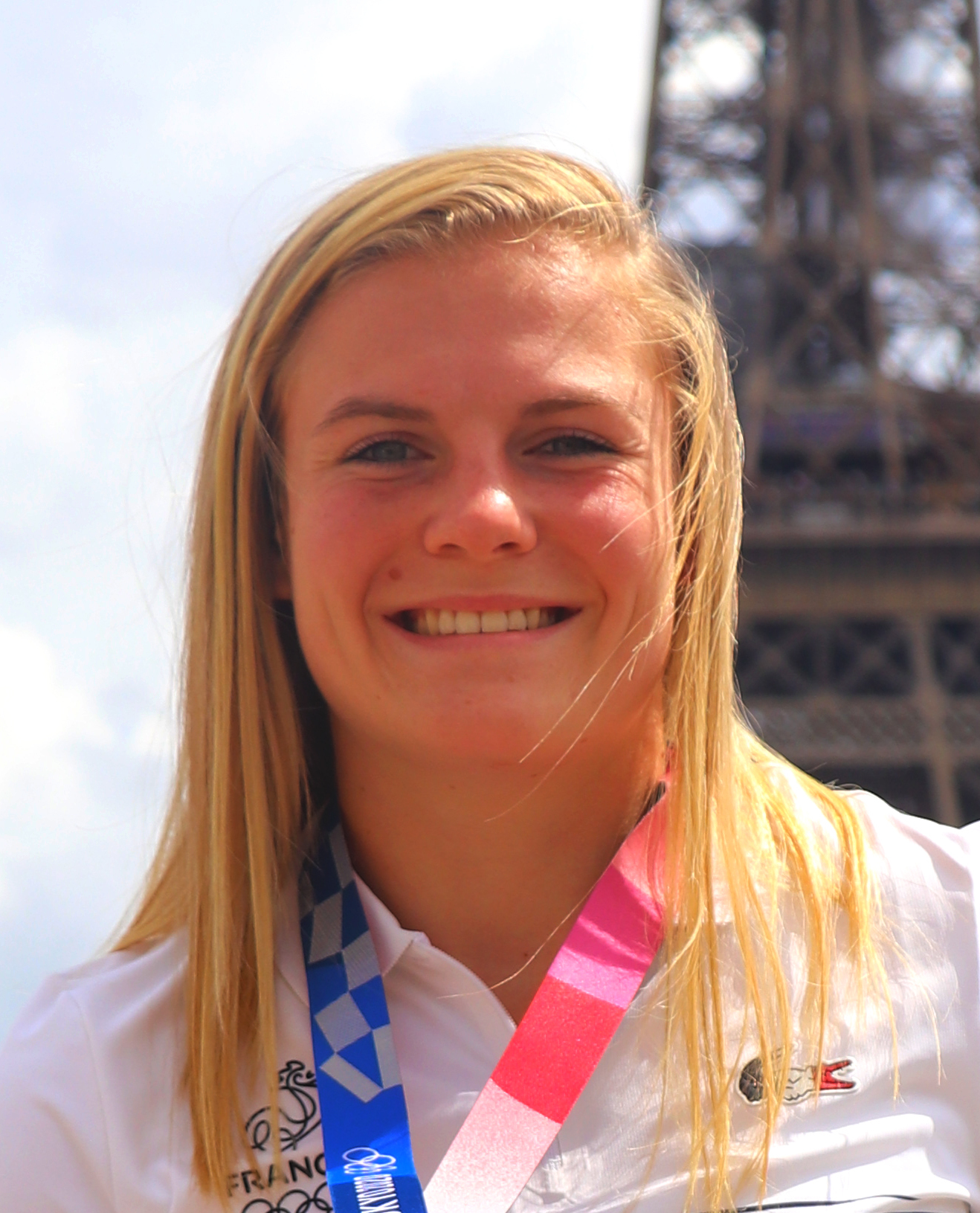
- Jacquet in 2021
- Full name: Chloé Alizée Jacquet
- Born: 17 April 2002 (age 24) Viriat, France
- Height: 1.66 m (5 ft 5 in)
- Weight: 61 kg (134 lb)

Rugby union career
- Position: Fullback
International career
Years	Team	Apps	(Points)
	France	10	(0)
National sevens team
Years	Team		Comps
- France
Medal record
Women's rugby sevens
Representing France
Olympic Games
Silver medal – second place	2020 Tokyo	Team competition

Chloé Alizée Jacquet (born 17 April 2002 in Viriat) is a French rugby union player who plays as a fullback. She plays rugby union for her home town Lyon in France where she also attends university.

Jacquet was named in the France squad for the Rugby sevens at the 2020 Summer Olympics. She was named in France's fifteens team for the 2021 Rugby World Cup in New Zealand.

She competed for France at the 2024 Summer Olympics.

Jacquet continued with France at the 2025-26 SVNS, her performances including a tries against Argentina and Spain at the 2026 Hong Kong Sevens.
