= Vicky A. Irwin =

Irish rugby union player (born 1998)

- Born: 4 April 1998 (age 28) Hamiltonsbawn, Northern Ireland
- Height: 168 cm (5 ft 6 in)
- Weight: 75 kg (165 lb; 11 st 11 lb)

Rugby union career
- Position: Centre
Senior career
Years	Team	Apps	(Points)
	Sale Sharks		(0)
International career
Years	Team	Apps	(Points)
2022–Present	Ireland	6	(0)

Victoria Anne Irwin (born 4 April 1998) is an Irish rugby union player. She plays for Sale Sharks, and the Ireland women's national rugby union team.

== Career ==
She competed at the 2022 Women's Six Nations Championship, and 2023 Women's Six Nations Championship.

At club level, Irwin plays for Sale Sharks Women.
