= Sarah Bern =

England international rugby union player

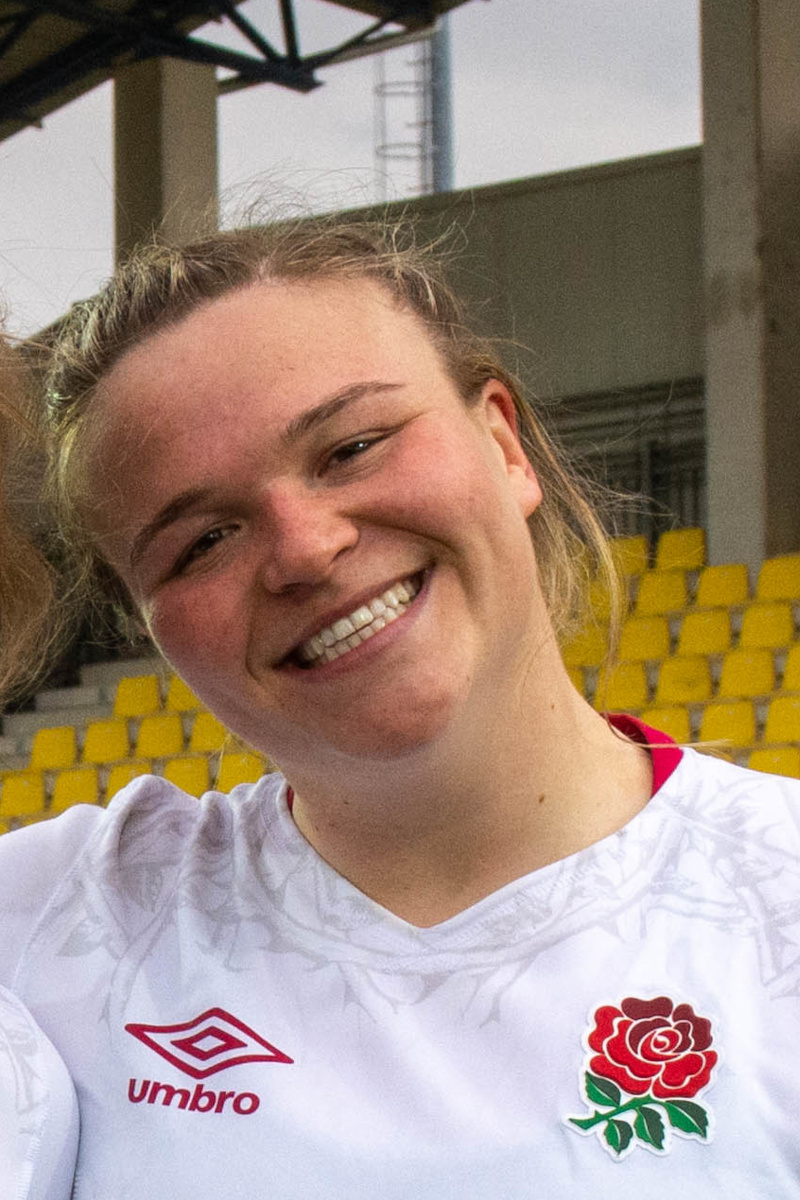
- Bern in 2022
- Born: 10 July 1997 (age 29)
- Height: 1.7 m (5 ft 7 in)
- Weight: 90 kg (200 lb; 14 st 2 lb)

Rugby union career
- Position: Prop
Senior career
Years	Team	Apps	(Points)
2017–2018	Gloucester-Hartpury	–	(25)
2018–	Bristol Bears	–	(80)
International career
Years	Team	Apps	(Points)
2016–	England	78	(150)
Medal record
Representing England
Women's rugby union
Rugby World Cup
Gold medal – first place	2025 England	Team competition
Silver medal – second place	2021 New Zealand	Team competition
Silver medal – second place	2017 Ireland	Team competition

Sarah Lilian C. Bern (born 10 July 1997) is an English rugby union player. She debuted for England in 2016 and is a member of their 2025 Rugby World Cup Champion side.

== Early life ==
Bern began playing rugby as an 11-year-old with the boys at London Irish ARFC. She initially played in the back row before switching to tighthead.

== International career ==
Bern was named in the 2017 Women's Rugby World Cup squad for England. She was the youngest member of the squad at 20. Bern's scored a crucial try for England in their semi-final match against France to see them into the finals. She also won player of the match.

She was named in the England squad for the delayed 2021 Rugby World Cup held in New Zealand in October and November 2022.

On 17 March 2025, she was called into the Red Roses side for the Six Nations Championship. She was named in England's squad for the Women's Rugby World Cup in England.

== Honours ==
England

- Women's Rugby World Cup
  - (gold) Champion (1): 2025
