= Caroline Drouin =

French rugby union player

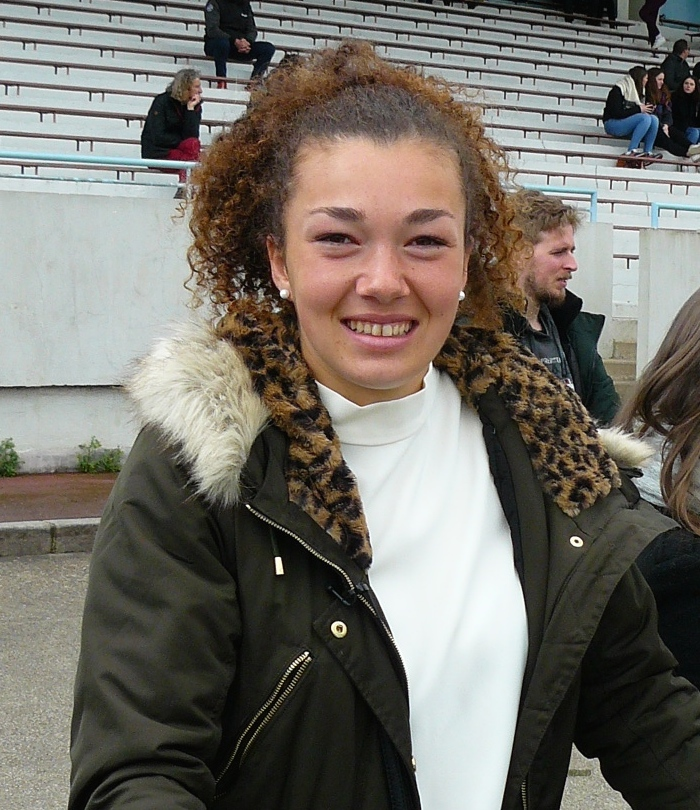
- Drouin in 2019
- Born: 7 July 1996 (age 30) Auray, Brittany
- Height: 1.72 m (5 ft 8 in)
- Weight: 71 kg (157 lb)

Rugby union career
- Position: Fly-Half
- Current team: Stade Rennais Rugby
International career
Years	Team	Apps	(Points)
2017–2024	France	30	(151)
National sevens team
Years	Team		Comps
2017–2024	France		
Medal record
Representing France
Women's rugby sevens
Olympic Games
Silver medal – second place	2020 Tokyo	Team competition

Caroline Drouin (born 7 July 1996) is a French, former rugby union player.

== Rugby career ==
Drouin was part of France's squad that placed third at the 2017 Rugby World Cup. In 2018, Her first-half try in the 18–17 victory over England played a crucial role in France winning the Six Nations Championship.

Drouin was instrumental for France in the Final Olympic Qualification Tournament as she scored a try and successfully made seven conversions to help them claim one of two available spots for the Tokyo Olympics. Her side eventually reached the final of the women's rugby Olympic tournament, but lost to New Zealand 26–12.

Drouin played for France in the 2021 Women's Six Nations Championship. She started at fly-half in the Six Nations final against England. She was named in France's fifteens team for the 2021 Rugby World Cup in New Zealand.

She was a member of the French women's sevens team that competed at the 2024 Summer Olympics.
