= Katie Dougan =

Scotland international rugby union player

- Born: 15 January 1995 (age 31) Fort William, Scotland
- Height: 1.70 m (5 ft 7 in)
- Weight: 90 kg (200 lb; 14 st 2 lb)

Rugby union career
- Position: Tighthead prop
Senior career
Years	Team	Apps	(Points)
2018-2020, 2021-2022	Gloucester-Hartpury		
2021-2021	Hillhead Jordanhill	2	(5)
2023	Wasps FC	10	
International career
Years	Team	Apps	(Points)
2015–present	Scotland	19	(0)

Katie Dougan (born 15 January 1995) is a Scottish rugby player from Fort William who has played in multiple Women's Six Nations Championships, including the 2021 Women's Six Nations Championship.

== Club career ==
In 2021, Dougan signed for Hillhead Jordanhill. Prior to this, she was a semi-professional player for Gloucester-Hartpury RFC, from 2018 to 2020.

As part of the University of Edinburgh's team while she studied there between 2013 and 2017. In 2017, she was part of the Edinburgh team that was the first Scottish team to win the BUCS League.

In 2016, she represented Edinburgh University in the Scottish Varsity match against St Andrews in front of 10,000 spectators at BT Murrayfield in September. The Edinburgh team won the match 97–0.

As of 2024, Dougan has signed up to coach Lakenham Union's men and women's XV teams in Norfolk. Dougan made her debut playing appearance for Lakenham in December 2024.

== International career ==
Dougan won her first Scotland cap in the 2015 Women's Six Nations Championship match against Italy.

At the 2017 Women's Six Nations Championship against Italy, she replaced Lindsay Smith at tighthead under the guidance of coach Shade Munro. She commented on her transition to international-level rugby, "The game is much faster and more physical than any club game, but I am loving the opportunity to learn from more experienced players.”

Dougan was part of the 2021 Women's Six Nations Championship team and played in the team's defeat to England and Italy ahead of their closing game against Wales, which they went on to win.

She was also part of the 2020 Women's Six Nations Championship, which was disrupted by COVID-19.

== Personal life ==
Dougan studied environmental geoscience at the University of Edinburgh in 2013.

Though she has also played shinty, she says of her preference for rugby, "I went along to the taster session and first social event during Freshers' week and loved the camaraderie of everyone in the team. I tried a couple of sports in first year and ended up playing both shinty and rugby. I represented Scottish Universities in Ireland for shinty but realised I was more interested in rugby where there were more opportunities to develop and challenge myself."

She is a former pupil of Lochaber High School.

== Honours ==
- Winner of the BUCS League 2017
