= Christy Haney =

Irish rugby union player

- Born: 2 February 1994 (age 32) Leesburg, United States
- Height: 165 cm (5 ft 5 in)
- Weight: 90 kg (198 lb; 14 st 2 lb)

Rugby union career
- Position: Prop
Senior career
Years	Team	Apps	(Points)
	Blackrock College RFC		(0)
	Leinster		(0)
International career
Years	Team	Apps	(Points)
2022–present	Ireland	19	(5)

Christy Haney (born 2 February 1994 Leesburg) is an Irish rugby union player. She plays for Leinster, and the Ireland women's national rugby union team.

== Early life and career ==
Haney grew up playing softball in her teenage years and discovered rugby while attending the University of Virginia. In two years she was on the all-American collegiate team that toured Canada. She moved to Ireland in 2016 to study for a Master's degree in structural engineering at University College Dublin.

== Rugby career ==
Haney has played for Blackrock College RFC and St Mary's before captaining Leinster in 2021. She made her international debut for Ireland against France during the 2022 Women's Six Nations Championship. She qualified for Ireland through her Irish grandmother who comes from Borrisokane in Tipperary.

She also featured in the 2023 Six Nations competition. In September 2024, she missed the WXV 1 tournament in Canada because of a knee injury she received in her sides test against Australia.

She was named in Ireland's side for the 2025 Six Nations Championship in March.
