= Nichola Fryday =

Ireland international rugby union player

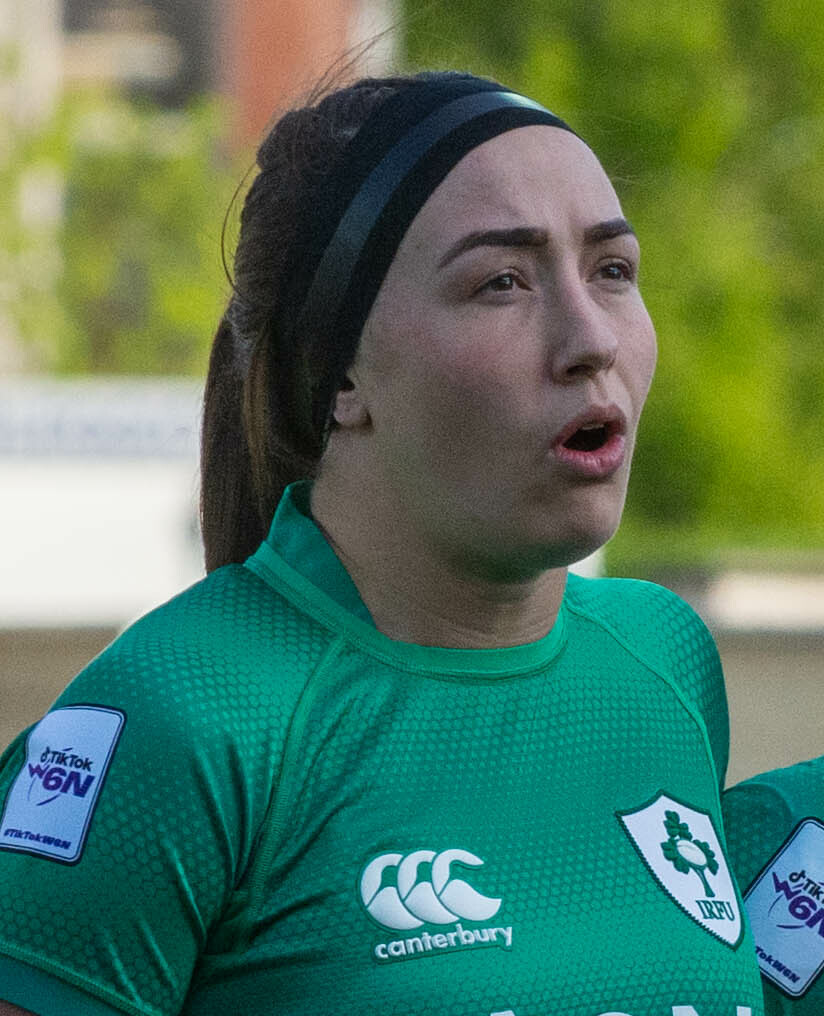
- Nichola Fryday
- Born: 2 June 1995 (age 31) Offaly, Ireland
- Height: 1.75 m (5 ft 9 in)
- Weight: 81 kg (179 lb; 12 st 11 lb)

Rugby union career
- Position: Lock
Amateur team(s)
Years	Team	Apps	(Points)
2015–2017	Tullamore RFC		
2018	Galwegians		
Senior career
Years	Team	Apps	(Points)
2019	Old Belvedere		
2020-	Blackrock College		
International career
Years	Team	Apps	(Points)
2016–present	Ireland	18	(0)

Nichola Fryday (born 2 June 1995) is an Irish rugby player from Kilcormac, Co Offaly. Nichola graduated from University College Dublin with a BAgrSc 2017 (Bachelor in Agricultural Science). She plays for Blackrock College RFC, Connacht Rugby and the Ireland women's national rugby union team. She has played for Ireland since 2016 and represented them in the 2021 Women's Six Nations Championship.

== Club career ==
Fryday did not take up rugby until she was at university. Her school, Kilkenny College, had rugby but not for girls at that time. During summer holidays of her second year of college her mother prompted her to join the local rugby club Tullamore RFC and she took to the game immediately.

She has played for Galwegians and Old Belvedere and joined Blackrock College RFC in 2020. She was first selected for Connacht's provincial squad in 2016 and made her competitive debut for them in the inter-provincials in December 2016 at number eight.

When she got her first Irish cap, against Canada, in the Autumn Internationals of 2016, it was also the first Irish senior cap for a female member of Tullamore Rugby Club.

In November 2021, Exeter Chiefs Women announced that they had signed Fryday from Blackrock and Connacht.

== International career ==
Fryday got her first cap for the Ireland women's national rugby union team in November 2016, in an Autumn International against Canada in the UCD Bowl, just two years after taking up the game.

Fryday represented Ireland in the 2017 Women's Six Nations but did not make the final cut for Ireland's team in the 2017 Women's World Cup.

In the 2018 Women's Six Nations she was a replacement against France and started versus Italy. She started in the second row in all five of Ireland's games in the 2019 Women's Six Nations. In the 2020 Women's Six Nations she started against Scotland and Italy.

In the 2021 Women's Six Nations, where Ireland finished third, she started all three of Ireland's games.

Fryday was named as Ireland captain for the 2022 TikTok Women's Six Nations, succeeding the retired Ciara Griffin.

== Personal life ==
Fryday has a degree in food and agri-business management from University College Dublin (2013–2017). She works as a customer care specialist with the Kerry Group since 2019.

In February 2020, as part of Aer Lingus' sponsorship of Irish Rugby, she was one of five members of the Ireland women's national rugby union team who were featured in giant murals painted in their home towns.
