= Enya Breen =

Ireland international rugby union player

- Born: 23 April 1999 (age 27) Cork City, Ireland
- Height: 173 cm (5 ft 8 in)
- Weight: 73 kg (161 lb)

Rugby union career
- Position: Centre
Amateur team(s)
Years	Team	Apps	(Points)
2007-2012	Carrigaline		
2014-2018	Bantry		
2012-2021	UL Bohemians		
Senior career
Years	Team	Apps	(Points)
- Munster
2018-	UL Bohemians		
International career
Years	Team	Apps	(Points)
2019–	Ireland	33	(32)
- Correct as of 14 September 2025
National sevens team
Years	Team		Comps
- Ireland 7s

Enya Breen (born 23 April 1999) is an Irish rugby union player from Skibbereen, County Cork. She plays for UL Bohemians, Munster and the Ireland women's national rugby union team. She is physiotherapy student.

== Club career ==
Breen's family originally lived in Cork city so she started rugby with the 'minis' in junior club Carrigaline RFC. Her family moved to Skibbereen when she was 10 and, with no underage girls' rugby locally, she joined Bantry Bay RFC. In 2018, when she moved to Limerick to go to college she joined UL Bohemians.

In 2019 she won the Energia National League 's 'Rising Star' award.

== International career ==
Breen was selected for the Munster Under-18 Development squad when she was just 15 and won the U18 interprovincial title with them in 2017. She was also selected for the Ireland Under-18 Sevens team and for the Ireland Women's Sevens Development squad in 2019 who played in the Dubai Sevens.

She made her Munster senior debut, against Connacht, in 2018. She was still a teenager when she got selected for the Ireland women's national rugby union team Autumn Internationals in 2018 but could not take part due to a shoulder injury.

Breen made her Ireland senior debut in the fourth round of the 2019 Women's Six Nations Championship, when she started at outside centre against France, aged 19. She also started against Wales in the final round.

Injury ruled her out of the 2020 Women's Six Nations but she was recovered in time to play in the rescheduled final game against Italy.

In the 2021 Women's Six Nations she was a replacement against Wales and Italy.

She was named in Ireland's side for the 2025 Six Nations Championship in March. She was announced as a member of the Irish squad to the Rugby World Cup in England.

== Personal life ==
She is one of six siblings and, from a young age, Breen played ladies gaelic football with O'Donovan Rossa and basketball for Skibbereen Community School and her county Cork. Her last major football game was a victorious Cork junior final (replay) against Castlehaven.

She is a physiotherapy student at the University of Limerick.

== Honours ==
- 2019 Energia National League 'Rising Star' award
