= Katie O'Dwyer =

- Born: 27 June 1991 (age 35) Galway, Ireland
- Height: 1.73 m (5 ft 8 in)
- Weight: 85 kg (187 lb; 13 st 5 lb)

Rugby union career
- Position: Prop
Senior career
Years	Team	Apps	(Points)
2014	Railway Union		
2013	Connacht		
- Leinster
International career
Years	Team	Apps	(Points)
2020–	Ireland	3	(0)
National sevens team
Years	Team		Comps
	Ireland 7s		0

Katie O'Dwyer (born 27 June 1991) is an Irish rugby player from Athenry, County Galway. She plays for Railway Union, Leinster Rugby and the Ireland women's national rugby union team at prop forward. She is a health and safety officer.

== Club career ==
O'Dwyer played camogie at county and All-Ireland club level for Athenry and County Galway before she joined All-Ireland League side Railway Union. She played for Connacht Rugby (her native province) for one year but work and travelling to Galway for training proved too much drain so she transferred to represent Leinster Rugby in Ireland's interprovincial series.

She was part of the Railway Union team that won their maiden All-Ireland League title in 2019 when they denied UL Bohemians a three in-a-row.

== International career ==
O'Dwyer was first selected for the Ireland women's national rugby union team in 2020. She made her test debut, as a replacement against Italy, in the 2020 Women's Six Nations.

She was selected in Ireland's team for the 2021 Women's Six Nations. She was a replacement for Lindsay Peat against Wales (in the 57th minute) and France (in the 59th minute).

== Personal life ==
O'Dywer won an All-Ireland Community Games medal with Athenry in 2003, played in an All-Ireland club final with Athenry and won an All-Ireland intermediate camogie title with Galway in 2013, when she lined out at right half-forward.

She has a BA in Agri-Environmental Science from UCD and a Masters in Environmental Health and Safety from the Technical University of Dublin. She works as a safety officer for Ireland's Office Of Public Works.
