= Chloe Pearse =

Irish rugby player

- Born: 3 March 1994 (age 32) Limerick, Ireland
- Height: 1.70 m (5 ft 7 in)
- Weight: 79 kg (174 lb; 12 st 6 lb)

Rugby union career
- Position: Flanker/Prop
Amateur team(s)
Years	Team	Apps	(Points)
- St Mary's RFC
–	Shannon RFC		
Senior career
Years	Team	Apps	(Points)
- UL Bohemians
–	Munster		
International career
Years	Team	Apps	(Points)
2016–	Ireland	2	(0)
National sevens team
Years	Team		Comps
	Ireland 7s		0

Chloe Pearse (born 3 March 1994) is an Irish rugby player from Limerick. She plays for UL Bohemians, Munster Rugby and the Ireland women's national rugby union team.

== Club career ==
Pearse started rugby as 13-year-old at St Mary's RFC in Limerick. Her first senior club was Shannon RFC and she moved to All-Ireland League side UL Bohemians to fulfill her ambition of lining out for Munster Rugby and she was their co-captain in 2020.

Pearse, whose position has varied from back-row to prop forward, was the top try scorer in the 2019–2020 All-Ireland League, scoring 15 tries in 12 games.

In 2021 she was a key figure in Munster winning their first interprovincial title since 2018, scoring three tries versus Ulster and two more in the final against Leinster. She captained the Munster team in the 2023/2024 and 2024/2025 seasons, leading them to back to back All-Ireland League crowns. She was vice-captain for the 2025/2026 season, where Munster won the Vodafone Women's Interprovincial Championship. She retired from provincial rugby in September 2025, and returned to Munster as an assistant coach in June 2026.

== International career ==
Pearse made her debut for the Ireland women's national rugby union team, against England, in an Autumn international in 2016 when she replaced the injured Claire Molloy after just 45 minutes. She also played against Canada in that series.

She has been selected to the Ireland XV squad for the Women's Six Nations Championship in 2018, 2020 and 2021 but has not yet made her Six Nations debut.

Pearse lined out for Munster against the first women's Barbarians side in 2017.

== Personal life ==
Pearse has a Sports and Exercise degree from the University of Limerick where she also qualified with a Masters in Business Management. She works as a business development representative for Uber.

In January 2023, she proposed to her partner and team-mate, Clodagh O'Halloran, in Virgin Media Park in Cork after a win over Leinster, where they had first met seven years earlier. They married in the summer of 2026.
