= Emma Hooban =

- Born: 3 December 1997 (age 28) Portlaoise, Ireland
- Height: 1.68 m (5 ft 6 in)
- Weight: 76 kg (168 lb; 12 st 0 lb)

Rugby union career
- Position: Hooker
Amateur team(s)
Years	Team	Apps	(Points)
- Portlaoise RFC
Senior career
Years	Team	Apps	(Points)
2017	St Mary's		
2016	Leinster		
2019	Blackrock College		
International career
Years	Team	Apps	(Points)
2018–	Ireland	8	(5)
National sevens team
Years	Team		Comps
	Ireland 7s		0

Emma Hooban (born 3 December 1997) is an Irish rugby player from Portlaoise, Co Laois. She plays for St Mary's College RFC, Leinster and the Ireland women's national rugby union team.

== Club career ==
Hooban started playing rugby at a young age in her local club in Portlaoise RFC but didn't get to play with other girls until she was 10, when local Ireland international Alison Miller set up a girls' team in the club and coached them.

Hooban moved to All-Ireland League side St Mary's College RFC in 2017 and was part of the Leinster side that won the Interprovincial series in 2018, which earned her first selection for the Ireland women's national rugby union team.

== International career ==
Hooban made her debut for Ireland, as a replacement against USA, in the Autumn Internationals of 2018.

She made her Six Nations debut, as a replacement against England, in the 2019 Women's Six Nations, when she also started against Scotland and Italy and was a replacement against France and Wales. In the 2019 Women's Six Nations game against Scotland she started in an Ireland team that included her former coach Alison Miller.

She was recalled to the Irish panel for the 2021 Women's Six Nations. She made one appearance, as a replacement against France, when she scored a try.

== Personal life ==
Hooban played representative-level golf in her youth and also some ladies gaelic football and Australian Rules football (in Ireland).

She is studying mental health nursing at Dublin City University where she receives a sports scholarship.
