= Hannah O'Connor =

- Born: 28 April 1990 (age 36) Kildare, Ireland
- Height: 1.75 m (5 ft 9 in)
- Weight: 85 kg (187 lb; 13 st 5 lb)

Rugby union career
- Position(s): Back Row, Second Row
Amateur team(s)
Years	Team	Apps	(Points)
2015-2018	CYM Terenure		
Senior career
Years	Team	Apps	(Points)
2018-	Blackrock College		
2018-	Leinster		
International career
Years	Team	Apps	(Points)
2019–present	Ireland	20	(0)
National sevens team
Years	Team		Comps
	Ireland 7s		0

Hannah O'Connor (born 28 April 1990) is an Irish rugby player from Galway. She plays for Blackrock College RFC, Leinster and the Ireland women's national rugby union team.

== Club career ==
O'Connor excelled at several sports in her youth and only took up rugby in 2013 for social reasons. Her first club was CYM Terenure, a Leinster League Division 2 side. To get experience at Ireland's premier level (the All-Ireland League) she moved to Blackrock College RFC which also led to her selection for provincial side Leinster.

O'Connor started out in rugby playing in the out-half position, then moved to centre but now plays in the back row. She can play any position in the back-row but plays number eight at club level. Unique for a forward she is also a place-kicker and takes them for club and province (Leinster). O'Connor was the top place-kicker in the 2019-2020 All-Ireland League when she was also selected as its Player of the Year.

She has won the interprovincial series with Leinster in 2018 and 2019 and was the competition's top points scorer in 2019.

== International career ==
O'Connor made her debut for the Ireland women's national rugby union team in November 2019 in an Autumn international, when she was a replacement for Judy Bobbett.

She made her Six Nations debut in the 2020 Women's Six Nations as a late replacement for Dorothy Wall against Italy.

She played in Ireland's three games in the 2021 Women's Six Nations which was rescheduled and re-formatted due to COVID-19. She replaced Ciara Griffin after 64 minutes against Wales, replaced Claire Molloy after 54 minutes versus France and replaced Griffin (who had a head injury) after just 13 minutes of the 3rd/4th place playoff against Italy which Ireland won 25–5.

== Personal life ==
Born in Dublin, O'Connor's family moved from Kildare to Loughrea, Galway which gave her a very broad sporting experience. She first played soccer and ladies gaelic football, then camogie and golf. She was the Connacht Junior Girls' Golf Champion in 2006 and represented Connacht at U18 level in golf.

She is a primary school teacher in Lucan.
