= Neve Jones =

Irish rugby union player

- Born: 26 December 1998 (age 27) County Antrim, Northern Ireland
- Height: 157 cm (5 ft 2 in)
- Weight: 72 kg (159 lb)

Rugby union career
- Position(s): Hooker, Flanker
Senior career
Years	Team	Apps	(Points)
2003-2010	Ballymena		
2014-2022	Malone RFC		
2022-	Gloucester-Hartpury		
Provincial / State sides
Years	Team	Apps	(Points)
2015-	Ulster		
International career
Years	Team	Apps	(Points)
2020–	Ireland	51	(65)
- Correct as of 31 October 2026
National sevens team
Years	Team		Comps
	Ireland 7s		0

Neve Jones (born 26 December 1998) is an Irish rugby player from Ballymena. She plays for Gloucester-Hartpury, Ulster and the Ireland women's national rugby union team.

== Club career ==
Jones started playing rugby at age 6, through mini rugby in her local club Ballymena RFC. There was no girls' rugby in her schools Cambridge House Grammar School and Ballymena Academy. Neve's attempts to launch girls' teams at these schools were rejected, so she joined Malone RFC when she was 14.

She captained the Ulster U18s to the first Irish U18 Provincial trophy in 2016.

Jones was Malone's top try-scorer in 2019 and the winner of the 2020 Energia Women's All Ireland League Rising Star Award.

On 7 January 2022, Gloucester-Hartpury announced that they'd signed Jones to their squad.

== International career ==
Jones first got selected to the Ireland women's national rugby union team in 2020, making her the first female international player to represent Malone RFC.

She made her debut as a replacement versus Italy, in the 2020 Women's Six Nations.

In the 2021 Women's Six Nations, she played as a replacement, versus Wales.

She was named in Ireland's XVs side for the 2025 Six Nations Championship in March. On 11 August 2025, she was selected in the Irish squad to the Rugby World Cup.

== Personal life ==
Jones is studying sports coaching at the University of Ulster in Jordanstown.

Before she played rugby she was involved in swimming, netball and jiu jitsu. She took up ladies gaelic football in 2020 and plays for East Belfast GFC, the first GAA team to be set up there in nearly 50 years.

== Honours ==
- 2020 Energia Women's All Ireland League Rising Star Award
