= 2023 Women's Six Nations Championship =

Women's rugby union competition

- Date: 25 March – 29 April 2023
- Countries: England; France; Ireland; Italy; Scotland; Wales

Tournament statistics
- Champions: England (19th title)
- Grand Slam: England (17th title)
- Triple Crown: England (23rd title)
- Matches played: 15
- Attendance: 155,091 (10,339 per match)
- Tries scored: 122 (8.13 per match)
- Top point scorer: (England) Marlie Packer (35)
- Top try scorer: (England) Marlie Packer (7)
- Player of the tournament: (France) Gabrielle Vernier
- Official website: Official website

The 2023 Women's Six Nations Championship, known as the TikTok Women's Six Nations for marketing purposes, was the 22nd series of the Women's Six Nations Championship, an annual women's rugby union competition featuring the national teams of England, France, Ireland, Italy, Scotland and Wales. It began on 25 March and concluded on 29 April 2023.

England entered the tournament as defending champions, having completed a Grand Slam in 2022 and retained their title with a 38–33 victory over France in the final game.

== Participants ==
Nation	Stadiums			Head coach	Captain
Nation	Home stadium	Capacity	Location	Head coach	Captain
England	Kingston Park	10,200	Newcastle	(England) Simon Middleton	Sarah Hunter; Marlie Packer (Note: Sarah Hunter and Marlie Packer were named as England co-captains for the opening round of the tournament, before Packer became the sole team captain following Hunter's retirement from rugby.)
England	Franklin's Gardens	15,200	Northampton	(England) Simon Middleton	Sarah Hunter; Marlie Packer
England	Twickenham Stadium	82,000	London	(England) Simon Middleton	Sarah Hunter; Marlie Packer
France	Stade de la Rabine	11,303	Vannes	(France) Gaëlle Mignot (France) David Ortiz	Audrey Forlani
France	Stade des Alpes	20,068	Grenoble	(France) Gaëlle Mignot (France) David Ortiz	Audrey Forlani
Ireland	Musgrave Park	8,008	Cork	(Ireland) Greg McWilliams	Nichola Fryday
Italy	Stadio Sergio Lanfranchi	5,000	Parma	(Italy) Giovanni Raineri	Elisa Giordano
Scotland	Edinburgh Rugby Stadium	7,800	Edinburgh	(Scotland) Bryan Easson	Rachel Malcolm
Wales	Cardiff Arms Park	12,125	Cardiff	(Wales) Ioan Cunningham	Hannah Jones

== Table ==
Position	Nation	Matches				Points			Tries		Bonus points			Table points
Position	Nation	Played	Won	Drawn	Lost	For	Against	Diff	For	Against	T BP	L BP	GS BP	Table points
1	England	5	5	0	0	271	48	+223	45	7	5	0	3	28
2	France	5	4	0	1	202	67	+135	32	10	4	1	0	21
3	Wales	5	3	0	2	118	135	–17	17	20	3	0	0	15
4	Scotland	5	2	0	3	94	178	–84	15	28	2	0	0	10
5	Italy	5	1	0	4	72	162	–90	10	26	0	0	0	4
6	Ireland	5	0	0	5	25	192	–167	3	31	0	0	0	0

Table ranking rules

- Four points are awarded for a win.
- Two points are awarded for a draw.
- A bonus point is awarded to a team that scores four or more tries, or loses by seven points or fewer.
- Three bonus points are awarded to a team that wins all five of their matches (a Grand Slam). This ensures that a Grand Slam winning team would top the table with at least 23 points, as another team could lose one match while winning two bonus points and win the other four matches while winning four bonus points for a maximum of 22 points.
- Tiebreakers
  - If two or more teams are tied on table points, the team with the better points difference (points scored against points conceded) is ranked higher.
  - If the above tiebreaker fails to separate tied teams, the team that scores the higher number of total tries (including penalty tries) in their matches is ranked higher.
  - If two or more teams remain tied after applying the above tiebreakers then those teams will be placed at equal rank; if the tournament has concluded and more than one team is placed first then the title will be shared between them.

== Fixtures ==
=== Round 1 ===
25 March 2023
14:15 GMT (UTC+0)

(1 BP) Wales	31–5	Ireland
Try: Callender 4' m Bevan 13' c Harries 23' c H. Jones 33' c Tuipulotu 46' m Con: Bevan (3/5) 14', 24', 34'	Report	Try: Fryday 67' m

Cardiff Arms Park, Cardiff
Attendance: 4,962
Referee: Amber McLachlan (Australia)

FB	15	Courtney Keight
RW	14	Lisa Neumann
OC	13	Hannah Jones (c)	(substituted off) 60'
IC	12	Kerin Lake
LW	11	Carys Williams-Morris
FH	10	Elinor Snowsill
SH	9	Keira Bevan	(substituted off) 60'
N8	8	Bethan Lewis	(substituted off) 57'
OF	7	Alex Callender
BF	6	Georgia Evans
RL	5	Gwen Crabb	(substituted off) 7'
LL	4	Abbie Fleming
TP	3	Sisilia Tuipulotu	(substituted off) 60'
HK	2	Kelsey Jones	(substituted off) 62'
LP	1	Gwenllian Pyrs
Replacements:
HK	16	Katharine Evans	(substituted in) 62'
PR	17	Caryl Thomas
PR	18	Cerys Hale	(substituted in) 60'
LK	19	Kate Williams	(substituted in) 57'
N8	20	Sioned Harries	(substituted in) 7'
SH	21	Ffion Lewis	(substituted in) 60'
FH	22	Lleucu George
WG	23	Hannah Bluck	(substituted in) 60'
Coach:
(Wales) Ioan Cunningham

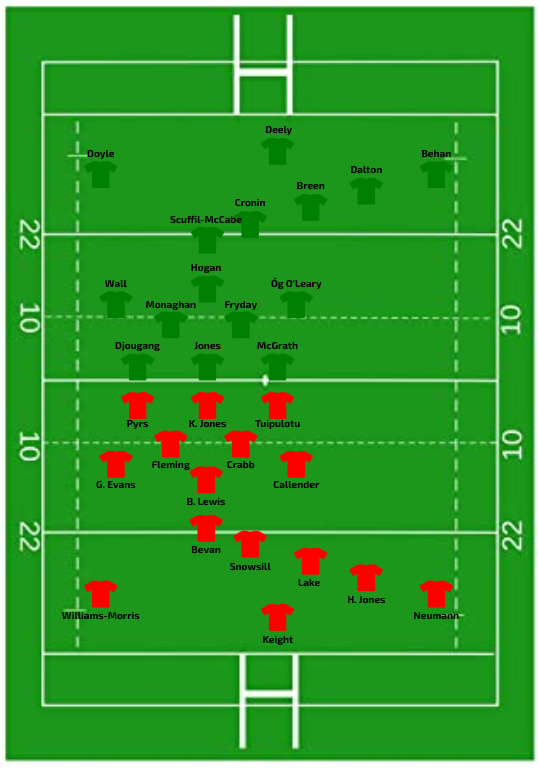

FB	15	Méabh Deely		(substituted off) 32'
RW	14	Aoife Doyle		(substituted off) 48'
OC	13	Aoife Dalton
IC	12	Enya Breen
LW	11	Natasja Behan
FH	10	Nicole Cronin				(substituted off) 64'
SH	9	Molly Scuffil-McCabe
N8	8	Brittany Hogan		(substituted off) 57'
OF	7	Maeve Óg O'Leary		(substituted off) 40'
BF	6	Dorothy Wall		(substituted off) 57'
RL	5	Sam Monaghan		20' to 32'
LL	4	Nichola Fryday (c)
TP	3	Linda Djougang
HK	2	Neve Jones
LP	1	Sadhbh McGrath		(substituted off) 57'
Replacements:
HK	16	Deirbhile Nic a Bháird	(yellow card) 44' to 54'	(substituted in) 40'
PR	17	Niamh O'Dowd
PR	18	Christy Haney		(substituted in) 57'
LK	19	Jo Brown		(substituted in) 57'
FL	20	Grace Moore		(substituted in) 57'
FL	21	Hannah O'Connor		(substituted in) 20'	(substituted off) 32'	(substituted in) 64'
SH	22	Dannah O'Brien		(substituted in) 48'
FB	23	Vicky A. Irwin		(substituted in) 32'
Coach:
(Ireland) Greg McWilliams

Player of the Match:
Sisilia Tuipulotu (Wales)

Assistant referees:
Doriane Domenjo (France)
Maria Latos (Germany)
Television match official:
Ian Tempest (England)

Notes:

- Kate Williams (Wales), Natasja Behan, Méabh Deely, Sadhbh McGrath and Niamh O'Dowd (all Ireland) made their international debuts.

25 March 2023
16:45 GMT (UTC+0)

(1 BP) England	58–7	Scotland
Try: MacDonald (2) 9' c, 24' m Cokayne (2) 18' m, 31' c Heard 27' c P. Cleall 42' m Kabeya 50' c M. Packer (3) 58' m, 63' m, 67' m Con: Reed (1/1) 9'; Tuima (3/9) 28', 32', 51'	Report	Try: Rollie 75' c Con: Nelson (1/1) 77' c

Kingston Park, Newcastle
Attendance: 10,053
Referee: Aimee Barrett-Theron (South Africa)

FB	15	Abigail Dow	(substituted off) 62'
RW	14	Jess Breach
OC	13	Lagi Tuima
IC	12	Amber Reed	(substituted off) 19'
LW	11	Claudia MacDonald
FH	10	Holly Aitchison
SH	9	Lucy Packer	(substituted off) 62'
N8	8	Sarah Hunter (cc)	(substituted off) 59'
OF	7	Marlie Packer (cc)
BF	6	Sadia Kabeya
RL	5	Poppy Cleall	(substituted off) 65'
LL	4	Zoe Aldcroft	(substituted off) 62'
TP	3	Sarah Bern	(substituted off) 53'
HK	2	Amy Cokayne	(substituted off) 53'
LP	1	Mackenzie Carson	(substituted off) 53'
Replacements:
HK	16	Lark Davies	(substituted in) 53'
PR	17	Liz Crake	(substituted in) 53'
PR	18	Kelsey Clifford	(substituted in) 53'
LK	19	Catherine O'Donnell	(substituted in) 59'
FL	20	Sarah Beckett	(substituted in) 62'
SH	21	Ella Wyrwas	(substituted in) 62'
CE	22	Tatyana Heard	(substituted in) 19'
FB	23	Emma Sing	(substituted in) 62'
Coach:
(England) Simon Middleton

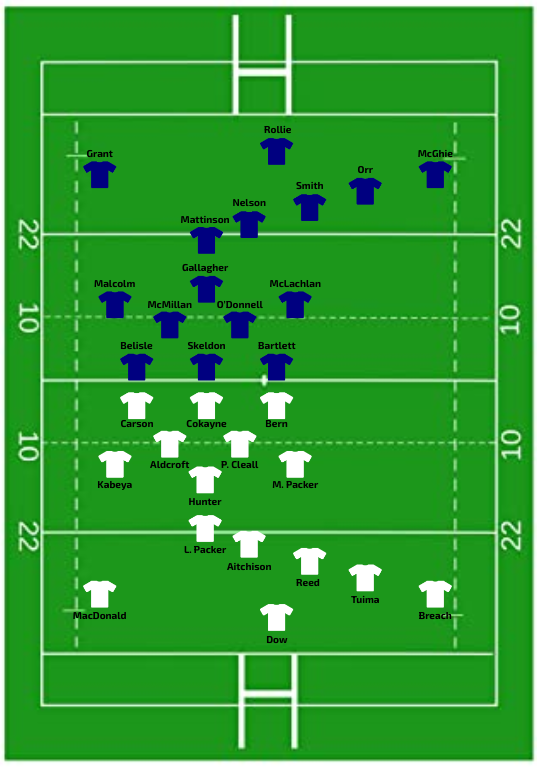

FB	15	Chloe Rollie
RW	14	Coreen Grant	(substituted off) 52'
OC	13	Emma Orr
IC	12	Meryl Smith	(substituted off) 63'
LW	11	Francesca McGhie
FH	10	Helen Nelson
SH	9	Caity Mattinson	(substituted off) 53'
N8	8	Evie Gallagher
OF	7	Rachel McLachlan
BF	6	Rachel Malcolm (c)	(substituted off) 64'
RL	5	Louise McMillan
LL	4	Lyndsay O'Donnell	(substituted off) 72'
TP	3	Christine Belisle	(substituted off) 52'
HK	2	Lana Skeldon	(substituted off) 53'
LP	1	Leah Bartlett	(substituted off) 67'
Replacements:
HK	16	Jodie Rettie	(substituted in) 53'
PR	17	Anne Young	(substituted in) 67'
PR	18	Elliann Clarke	(substituted in) 52'
LK	19	Eva Donaldson	(substituted in) 72'
FL	20	Eilidh Sinclair	(substituted in) 64'
SH	21	Mairi McDonald	(substituted in) 53'
FH	22	Beth Blacklock	(substituted in) 63'
WG	23	Liz Musgrove	(substituted in) 52'
Coach:
(Scotland) Bryan Easson

Player of the Match:
Marlie Packer (England)

Assistant referees:
Precious Pazani (Zimbabwe)
Adele Roberts (Belgium)
Television match official:
Olly Hodges (Ireland)

Notes:

- Kelsey Clifford, Liz Crake and Ella Wyrwas (all England), and Francesca McGhie and Beth Blacklock (both Scotland) made their international debuts.
- Mackenzie Carson made her debut for England, having previously earned three caps for Canada.
- This was the 141st and final test match for Sarah Hunter (England) who announced her retirement in the week before kick-off.
- By playing against England, Caity Mattinson became the first woman to play both for and against England and Scotland in an Anglo-Scottish match.
- No replacement was issued for Poppy Cleall when she came off in the 65th minute.
- This was England 20th consecutive Women's Six Nations win, surpassing the records of 19 wins they made between 2005 and 2009, and 2009 and 2013.

26 March 2023
16:00 CEST (UTC+2)

Italy	12–22	France
Try: Franco 22' c D'Incà 48' m Con: Sillari (1/2) 24'	Report	Try: Vernier 25' m Arbez 34' c Boujard 75' c Con: Bourdon (1/2) 35'; Trémoulière (1/1) 76'; Pen: Bourdon (1/2) 8'

Stadio Sergio Lanfranchi, Parma
Attendance: 1,982
Referee: Maggie Cogger-Orr (New Zealand)

FB	15	Vittoria Ostuni Minuzzi
RW	14	Aura Muzzo	25' to 33'
OC	13	Michela Sillari
IC	12	Beatrice Rigoni
LW	11	Alyssa D'Incà
FH	10	Veronica Madia
SH	9	Sofia Stefan			(substituted off) 52'
N8	8	Elisa Giordano (c)
OF	7	Giada Franco	(substituted off) 66'
BF	6	Francesca Sgorbini
RL	5	Giordana Duca
LL	4	Valeria Fedrighi	(substituted off) 50'
TP	3	Lucia Gai	(substituted off) 57'
HK	2	Vittoria Vecchini
LP	1	Silvia Turani	(substituted off) 32'
Replacements:
HK	16	Emanuela Stecca
PR	17	Gaia Maris	(substituted in) 32'
PR	18	Sara Seye	(substituted in) 57'
LK	19	Sara Tounesi	(substituted in) 50'
FL	20	Isabella Locatelli	(substituted in) 66'
SH	21	Sara Barratin	(substituted in) 25'	(substituted off) 33'	(substituted in) 52'
CE	22	Emma Stevanini
FB	23	Beatrice Capomaggi
Coach:
(Italy) Giovanni Raineri

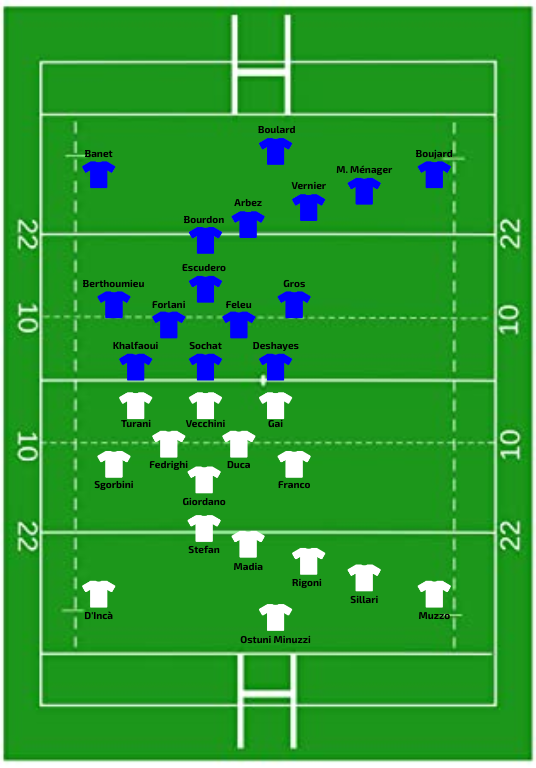

FB	15	Émilie Boulard
RW	14	Cyrielle Banet
OC	13	Marine Ménager		(substituted off) 70'
IC	12	Gabrielle Vernier
LW	11	Caroline Boujard	(yellow card) 28' to 38'
FH	10	Carla Arbez		(substituted off) 57'
SH	9	Pauline Bourdon		(substituted off) 77'
N8	8	Charlotte Escudero
OF	7	Émeline Gros		(substituted off) 67'
BF	6	Axelle Berthoumieu		(substituted off) 51'
RL	5	Audrey Forlani (c)
LL	4	Manae Feleu
TP	3	Assia Khalfaoui		(substituted off) 61'
HK	2	Agathe Sochat		(substituted off) 77'
LP	1	Annaëlle Deshayes		(substituted off) 61'
Replacements:
HK	16	Célia Domain		(substituted in) 77'
PR	17	Coco Lindelauf		(substituted in) 61'
PR	18	Rose Bernadou		(substituted in) 61'
LK	19	Maëlle Picut		(substituted in) 67'
FL	20	Gaëlle Hermet		(substituted in) 51'
SH	21	Alexandra Chambon		(substituted in) 77'
FH	22	Jessy Trémoulière		(substituted in) 57'
CE	23	Marie Dupouy		(substituted in) 70'
Coach:
(France) Gaëlle Mignot (France) David Ortiz

Player of the Match:
Gabrielle Vernier (France)

Assistant referees:
Hollie Davidson (Scotland)
Katherine Ritchie (England)
Television match official:
Olly Hodges (Ireland)

Notes:

- Audrey Forlani captained France for the first time.

=== Round 2 ===
1 April 2023
15:15 IST (UTC+1)

Ireland	3–53	France (1 BP)
Pen: O'Brien (1/1) 22'	Report	Try: Forlani 9' m Boujard 13' m Bourdon (2) 27' c, 32' m Vernier (2) 35' m, 71' c Sochat 55' c Banet 59' m Escudero 75' c Con: Bourgeois (2/5) 29', 56'; Trémoulière (2/2) 72', 76'

Musgrave Park, Cork
Attendance: 5,214
Referee: Hollie Davidson (Scotland)

FB	15	Méabh Deely	(yellow card) 70' to 80 +1'
RW	14	Aoife Doyle		(substituted off) 73'
OC	13	Aoife Dalton
IC	12	Vicky A. Irwin		(substituted off) 51'
LW	11	Natasja Behan
FH	10	Dannah O'Brien
SH	9	Molly Scuffil-McCabe		(substituted off) 51'
N8	8	Deirbhile Nic a Bháird
OF	7	Grace Moore		(substituted off) 57'
BF	6	Dorothy Wall
RL	5	Sam Monaghan
LL	4	Nichola Fryday (c)		(substituted off) 73'
TP	3	Christy Haney		(substituted off) 57'
HK	2	Neve Jones		(substituted off) 76'
LP	1	Linda Djougang		(substituted off) 73'
Replacements:
HK	16	Clara Nielson		(substituted in) 76'
PR	17	Sadhbh McGrath		(substituted in) 57'
PR	18	Kathryn Buggy		(substituted in) 73'
LK	19	Hannah O'Connor		(substituted in) 73'
N8	20	Brittany Hogan		(substituted in) 57'
SH	21	Emma Swords		(substituted in) 51'
CE	22	Anna McGann		(substituted in) 51'
WG	23	Lauren Delaney		(substituted in) 73'
Coach:
(Ireland) Greg McWilliams

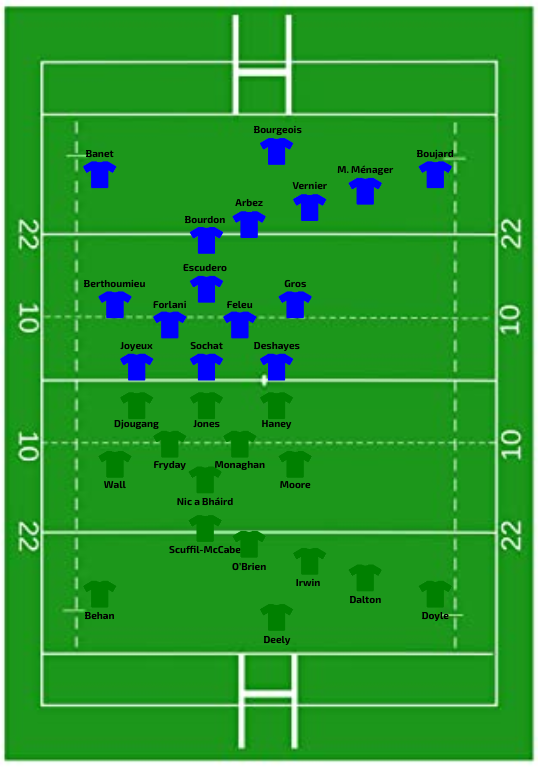

FB	15	Morgane Bourgeois
RW	14	Cyrielle Banet
OC	13	Marine Ménager		(substituted off) 60'
IC	12	Gabrielle Vernier
LW	11	Caroline Boujard
FH	10	Carla Arbez		(substituted off) 51'
SH	9	Pauline Bourdon		(substituted off) 58'
N8	8	Charlotte Escudero
OF	7	Émeline Gros		(substituted off) 51'
BF	6	Axelle Berthoumieu		(substituted off) 25'
RL	5	Audrey Forlani (c)		(substituted off) 67'
LL	4	Manae Feleu
TP	3	Clara Joyeux		(substituted off) 57'
HK	2	Agathe Sochat		(substituted off) 64'
LP	1	Annaëlle Deshayes	(red card) 21'
Replacements:
HK	16	Élisa Riffonneau		(substituted in) 64'
PR	17	Coco Lindelauf		(substituted in) 25'
PR	18	Assia Khalfaoui		(substituted in) 57'
LK	19	Maëlle Picut		(substituted in) 67'
FL	20	Gaëlle Hermet		(substituted in) 51'
SH	21	Alexandra Chambon		(substituted in) 58'
FH	22	Jessy Trémoulière		(substituted in) 51'
FB	23	Marie Dupouy		(substituted in) 60'
Coach:
(France) Gaëlle Mignot (France) David Ortiz

Player of the Match:
Pauline Bourdon (France)

Assistant referees:
Sara Cox (England)
Maria Heitor (Portugal)
Television match official:
Ben Whitehouse (Wales)

Notes:

- Kathryn Buggy and Emma Swords (both Ireland) and Élisa Riffonneau (France) made their international debuts.
- Clara Nielson made her debut for Ireland, having previously earned one cap for England.
- Nicole Cronin was originally named on the bench for Ireland, but withdrew due to injury. She was replaced by Emma Swords.

1 April 2023
17:30 BST (UTC+1)

Scotland	22–34	Wales
Try: Skeldon 34' c Grant 48' c Rollie 66' m Con: Nelson (2/3) 35', 49'; Pen: Nelson (1/1) 28'	Report	Try: Tuipulotu (2) 3' m, 52' m Pyrs (2) 29' c, 42' c F. Lewis 79' c Con: Bevan (2/4) 30', 44'; Snowsill (1/1) 80'; Pen: Snowsill (1/1) 74'

Edinburgh Rugby Stadium, Edinburgh
Attendance: 3,031
Referee: Maggie Cogger-Orr (New Zealand)

FB	15	Chloe Rollie
RW	14	Coreen Grant	(substituted off) 67'
OC	13	Emma Orr
IC	12	Meryl Smith	(substituted off) 74'
LW	11	Francesca McGhie
FH	10	Helen Nelson
SH	9	Caity Mattinson	(substituted off) 57'
N8	8	Evie Gallagher
OF	7	Rachel McLachlan	1' to 13'		(substituted off) 30'
BF	6	Rachel Malcolm (c)
RL	5	Louise McMillan
LL	4	Lyndsay O'Donnell	(substituted off) 67'
TP	3	Christine Belisle	(substituted off) 57'
HK	2	Lana Skeldon	(substituted off) 80'
LP	1	Leah Bartlett	(substituted off) 69'
Replacements:
HK	16	Jodie Rettie	(substituted in) 80'
PR	17	Anne Young	(substituted in) 69'
PR	18	Elliann Clarke	(substituted in) 57'
LK	19	Eva Donaldson	(substituted in) 67'
N8	20	Eilidh Sinclair	(substituted in) 1'	(substituted off) 13'	(substituted in) 30'
SH	21	Mairi McDonald	(substituted in) 57'
FH	22	Beth Blacklock	(substituted in) 74'
WG	23	Liz Musgrove	(substituted in) 67'
Coach:
(Scotland) Bryan Easson

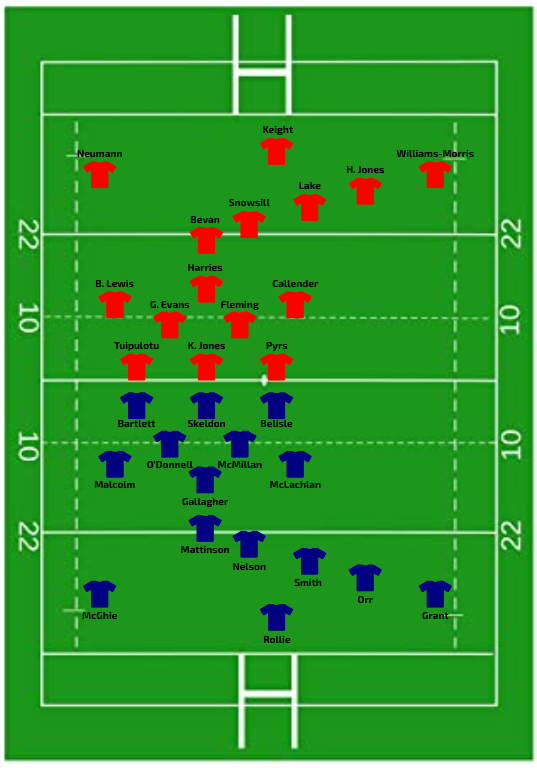

FB	15	Courtney Keight
RW	14	Lisa Neumann		(substituted off) 80'
OC	13	Hannah Jones (c)
IC	12	Kerin Lake	(yellow card) 40' to 50'
LW	11	Carys Williams-Morris
FH	10	Elinor Snowsill		(substituted off) 80'
SH	9	Keira Bevan		(substituted off) 61'
N8	8	Sioned Harries		(substituted off) 64'
OF	7	Alex Callender
BF	6	Bethan Lewis
RL	5	Georgia Evans
LL	4	Abbie Fleming		(substituted off) 67'
TP	3	Sisilia Tuipulotu		(substituted off) 80'
HK	2	Kelsey Jones		(substituted off) 80'
LP	1	Gwenllian Pyrs		(substituted off) 80'
Replacements:
HK	16	Carys Phillips		(substituted in) 80'
PR	17	Cara Hope		(substituted in) 80'
PR	18	Cerys Hale		(substituted in) 80'
LK	19	Natalia John		(substituted in) 67'
N8	20	Kate Williams		(substituted in) 64'
SH	21	Ffion Lewis		(substituted in) 61'
FH	22	Robyn Wilkins		(substituted in) 80'
CE	23	Hannah Bluck		(substituted in) 80'
Coach:
(Wales) Ioan Cunningham

Player of the Match:
Sisilia Tuipulotu (Wales)

Assistant referees:
Beatrice Benvenuti (Italy)
Mario Pacifico (Italy)
Television match official:
Leo Colgan (Ireland)

Notes:

- Keira Bevan (Wales) earned her 50th test cap.
- Lleucu George was originally named on the bench for Wales, but withdrew due to injury. She was replaced by Robyn Wilkins.

2 April 2023
15:00 BST (UTC+1)

(1 BP) England	68–5	Italy
Try: Breach (3) 3' c, 39' m, 64' m Dow (4) 9' m, 53' c, 56' m, 72' m MacDonald (2) 17' m, 33' m Heard 46' c M. Packer (2) 68' c, 78' m Con: Aitchison (1/5) 4'; Tuima (1/1) 47'; Sing (2/6) 54', 70'	Report	Try: Tounesi 4' m

Franklin's Gardens, Northampton
Attendance: 12,947
Referee: Kat Roche (United States)

FB	15	Abigail Dow
RW	14	Jess Breach
OC	13	Lagi Tuima
IC	12	Tatyana Heard	(substituted off) 66'
LW	11	Claudia MacDonald	(substituted off) 49'
FH	10	Holly Aitchison
SH	9	Lucy Packer	(substituted off) 62'
N8	8	Zoe Aldcroft
OF	7	Marlie Packer (c)
BF	6	Sadia Kabeya	(substituted off) 62'
RL	5	Delaney Burns
LL	4	Catherine O'Donnell	(substituted off) 62'
TP	3	Sarah Bern	(substituted off) 65'
HK	2	Amy Cokayne	(substituted off) 62'
LP	1	Mackenzie Carson	(substituted off) 65'
Replacements:
HK	16	Lark Davies	(substituted in) 62'
PR	17	Liz Crake	(substituted in) 65'
PR	18	Kelsey Clifford	(substituted in) 65'
FL	19	Sarah Beckett	(substituted in) 62'
LK	20	Emily Robinson	(substituted in) 62'
SH	21	Ella Wyrwas	(substituted in) 62'
CE	22	Sarah McKenna	(substituted in) 66'
FB	23	Emma Sing	(substituted in) 49'
Coach:
(England) Simon Middleton

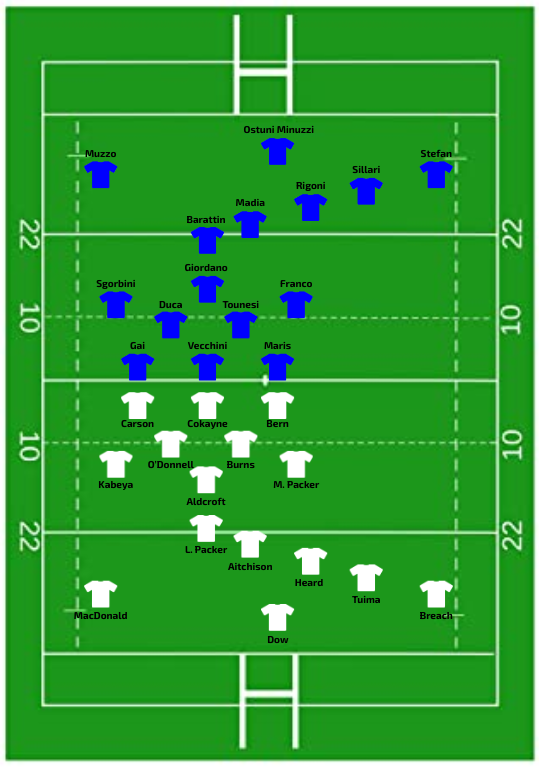

FB	15	Vittoria Ostuni Minuzzi
RW	14	Aura Muzzo
OC	13	Michela Sillari
IC	12	Beatrice Rigoni	26' to 34'		(substituted off) 62'
LW	11	Sofia Stefan
FH	10	Veronica Madia	(substituted off) 47'
SH	9	Sara Barattin			(substituted off) 58'
N8	8	Elisa Giordano (c)	(substituted off) 67'
OF	7	Giada Franco
BF	6	Francesca Sgorbini
RL	5	Giordana Duca	(substituted off) 54'
LL	4	Sara Tounesi
TP	3	Lucia Gai	(substituted off) 54'
HK	2	Vittoria Vecchini
LP	1	Gai Maris
Replacements:
HK	16	Emanuela Stecca	(substituted in) 67'
PR	17	Alice Cassaghi
PR	18	Sara Seye	(substituted in) 54'
LK	19	Valeria Fedrighi	(substituted in) 54'
FL	20	Isabella Locatelli				(substituted in) 67'
SH	21	Emma Stevanin	(substituted in) 47'
CE	22	Jessica Busato			(substituted in) 62'	(substituted off) 67'
FB	23	Beatrice Capomaggi	(substituted in) 26'	(substituted off) 34'	(substituted in) 58'
Coach:
(Italy) Giovanni Raineri

Player of the Match:
Sarah Bern (England)

Assistant referees:
Doirane Domenjo (France)
Mary Pringle (Scotland)
Television match official:
Andrew McMenemy (Scotland)

Notes:

- Delaney Burns and Emily Robinson (both England) made their international debuts.

=== Round 3 ===
15 April 2023
14:15 BST (UTC+1)

Wales	3–59	England (1 BP)
Pen: Bevan (1/1) 14'	Report	Try: L. Packer 27' c Heard 36' m Dow 40' +1 c Aitchison 46' m Breach 51' c Kildunne 55' c Muir 60' c Botterman 64' c Beckett 74' c Con: Sing (3/5) 28', 40' +2, 51'; Tuima (4/4) 56', 61', 65', 75'

Cardiff Arms Park, Cardiff
Attendance: 8,862
Referee: Joy Neville (Ireland)

FB	15	Courtney Keight
RW	14	Lisa Neumann
OC	13	Hannah Jones (c)
IC	12	Hannah Bluck		(substituted off) 57'
LW	11	Lowri Norkett
FH	10	Elinor Snowsill
SH	9	Keira Bevan		(substituted off) 54'
N8	8	Sioned Harries		(substituted off) 54'
OF	7	Alex Callender
BF	6	Bethan Lewis
RL	5	Georgia Evans
LL	4	Abbie Fleming		(substituted off) 47'
TP	3	Sisilia Tuipulotu		(substituted off) 54'
HK	2	Kelsey Jones		(substituted off) 54'
LP	1	Gwenllian Pyrs		(substituted off) 65'
Replacements:
HK	16	Carys Phillips		(substituted in) 54'
PR	17	Cara Hope		(substituted in) 65'
PR	18	Cerys Hale		(substituted in) 54'
LK	19	Natalia John		(substituted in) 47'	(substituted off) 70'
FL	20	Kate Williams	(yellow card) 59' to 69'	(substituted in) 54'
FL	21	Bryonie King			(substituted in) 70'
SH	22	Ffion Lewis		(substituted in) 54'
FH	23	Robyn Wilkins		(substituted in) 57'
Coach:
(Wales) Ioan Cunningham

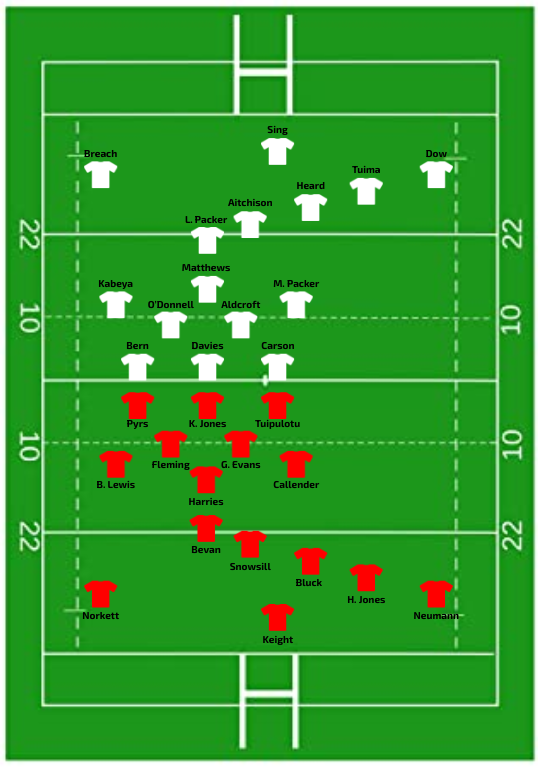

FB	15	Emma Sing		(substituted off) 54'
RW	14	Jess Breach
OC	13	Lagi Tuima
IC	12	Tatyana Heard		(substituted off) 62'
LW	11	Abigail Dow
FH	10	Holly Aitchison
SH	9	Lucy Packer		(substituted off) 54'
N8	8	Alex Matthews		(substituted off) 40'
OF	7	Marlie Packer (c)	(yellow card) 66' to 77'
BF	6	Sadia Kabeya
RL	5	Catherine O'Donnell		(substituted off) 13'
LL	4	Zoe Aldcroft
TP	3	Sarah Bern		(substituted off) 59'
HK	2	Lark Davies		(substituted off) 57'
LP	1	Mackenzie Carson		(substituted off) 52'
Replacements:
HK	16	May Campbell	(yellow card) 66' to 77'	(substituted in) 57'
PR	17	Hannah Botterman		(substituted in) 52'
PR	18	Maud Muir		(substituted in) 59'
LK	19	Delaney Burns		(substituted in) 40'
FL	20	Sarah Beckett		(substituted in) 13'
SH	21	Ella Wyrwas		(substituted in) 54'
CE	22	Sarah McKenna		(substituted in) 62'
FB	23	Ellie Kildunne		(substituted in) 54'
Coach:
(England) Simon Middleton

Player of the Match:
Tatyana Heard (England)

Assistant referees:
Beatrice Benvenuti (Italy)
Maria Pacifico (Italy)
Television match official:
Olly Hodges (Ireland) Notes:

- * Bryonie King (Wales) and May Campbell (England) made their international debuts.

15 April 2023
16:45 CEST (UTC+2)

Italy	24–7	Ireland
Try: Stefan 29' c D'Incà (2) 42' c, 78' c Con: Sillari (3/3) 30', 43', 79'; Pen: Sillari (1/1) 64'	Report	Try: Penalty try 68'

Stadio Sergio Lanfranchi, Parma
Attendance: 3,872
Referee: Aurélie Groizeleau (France)

FB	15	Beatrice Capomaggi	(substituted off) 69'
RW	14	Aura Muzzo
OC	13	Michela Sillari
IC	12	Beatrice Rigoni
LW	11	Alyssa D'Incà
FH	10	Veronica Madia	(substituted off) 64'
SH	9	Sofia Stefan (c)
N8	8	Giada Franco
OF	7	Isabella Locatelli	(substituted off) 71'
BF	6	Francesca Sgorbini	(substituted off) 57'
RL	5	Giordana Duca
LL	4	Sara Tounesi	(substituted off) 80'
TP	3	Lucia Gai	(substituted off) 68'
HK	2	Vittoria Vecchini
LP	1	Gaia Maris	(substituted off) 80'
Replacements:
HK	16	Emanuela Stecca	(substituted in) 80'
PR	17	Alice Cassaghi
PR	18	Sara Seye	(substituted in) 68'
LK	19	Valeria Fedrighi	(substituted in) 57'
FL	20	Laura Gurioli	(substituted in) 80'
FL	21	Alissa Ranuccini	(substituted in) 71'
SH	22	Sara Barattin	(substituted in) 69'
WG	23	Emma Stevanin	(substituted in) 64'
Coach:
(Italy) Giovanni Raineri

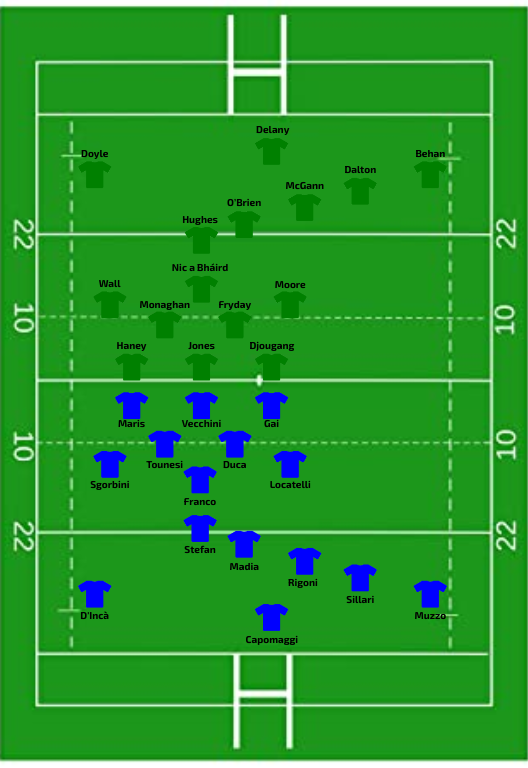

FB	15	Lauren Delany
RW	14	Aoife Doyle
OC	13	Aoife Dalton	(substituted off) 77'
IC	12	Anna McGann
LW	11	Natasja Behan	(substituted off) 62'
FH	10	Dannah O'Brien
SH	9	Ailsa Hughes	(substituted off) 57'
N8	8	Deirbhile Nic a Bháird
OF	7	Grace Moore	(substituted off) 66'
BF	6	Dorothy Wall	(substituted off) 59'
RL	5	Sam Monaghan
LL	4	Nichola Fryday (c)
TP	3	Christy Haney	(substituted off) 53'
HK	2	Neve Jones	(substituted off) 71'
LP	1	Linda Djougang	(substituted off) 80'
Replacements:
HK	16	Clara Nielson	(substituted in) 71'
PR	17	Sadhbh McGrath	(substituted in) 80'
PR	18	Kathryn Buggy	(substituted in) 53'
LK	19	Hannah O'Connor	(substituted in) 66'
FL	20	Brittany Hogan	(substituted in) 60'
SH	21	Molly Scuffil-McCabe	(substituted in) 57'
CE	22	Vicky A. Irwin	(substituted in) 77'
WG	23	Méabh Deely	(substituted in) 62'
Coach:
(Ireland) Greg McWilliams

Player of the Match:
Alyssa D'Incà (Italy)

Assistant referees:
Maria Latos (German)
Mary Pringle (Scotland)
Television match official:
Ian Tempest (England)

16 April 2023
15:15 CEST (UTC+2)

(1 BP) France	55–0	Scotland
Try: Bourdon 12' m Llorens 23' m Boulard (3) 37' c, 45' m, 56' c Hermet 50' c Vernier 54' c R. Ménager 62' m Filopon 73' m Con: Trémoulière (4/8) 38', 51', 55', 57'; Arbez (1/1) 74'	Report

Stade de la Rabine, Vannes
Attendance: 10,044
Referee: Lauren Jenner (New Zealand)

FB	15	Émilie Boulard
RW	14	Caroline Boujard	(substituted off) 63'
OC	13	Marine Ménager
IC	12	Gabrielle Vernier
LW	11	Mélissande Llorens
FH	10	Jessy Trémoulière	(substituted off) 63'
SH	9	Pauline Bourdon	(substituted off) 56'
N8	8	Charlotte Escudero
OF	7	Gaëlle Hermet
BF	6	Axelle Berthoumieu	(substituted off) 66'
RL	5	Audrey Forlani (c)	(substituted off) 52'
LL	4	Maëlle Picut
TP	3	Assia Khalfaoui	(substituted off) 56'
HK	2	Agathe Sochat	(substituted off) 66'
LP	1	Yllana Brosseau	(substituted off) 58'
Replacements:
HK	16	Élisa Riffonneau	(substituted in) 66'
PR	17	Ambre Mwayembe	(substituted in) 58'
PR	18	Rose Bernadou	(substituted in) 56'
N8	19	Romane Ménager	(substituted in) 52'
LK	20	Julie Annery	(substituted in) 66'
SH	21	Alexandra Chambon	(substituted in) 56'
FH	22	Carla Arbez	(substituted in) 63'
CE	23	Maëlle Filopon	(substituted in) 63'
Coach:
(France) Gaëlle Mignot (France) David Ortiz

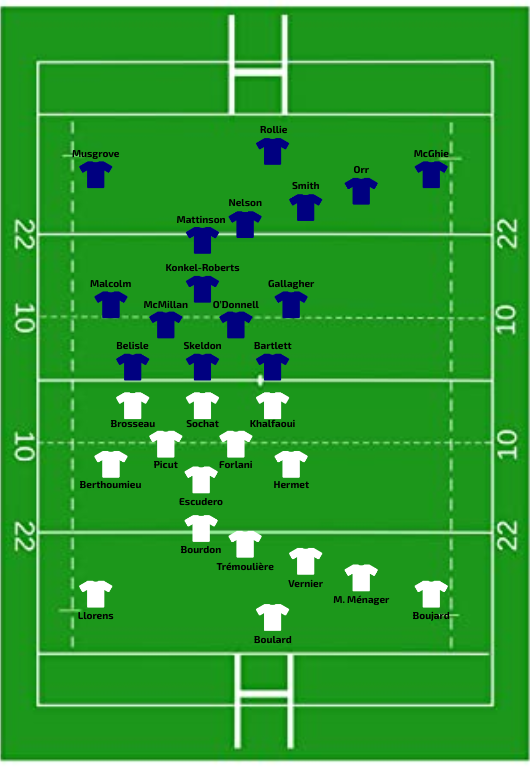

FB	15	Chloe Rollie
RW	14	Liz Musgrove
OC	13	Emma Orr	(substituted off) 77'
IC	12	Lisa Thomson
LW	11	Francesca McGhie	(substituted off) 9'
FH	10	Helen Nelson	(substituted off) 67'
SH	9	Caity Mattinson	(substituted off) 58'
N8	8	Jade Konkel-Roberts	(substituted off) 47'
OF	7	Evie Gallagher
BF	6	Rachel Malcolm (c)
RL	5	Louise McMillan
LL	4	Lyndsay O'Donnell	(substituted off) 56'
TP	3	Christine Belisle	(substituted off) 58'
HK	2	Lana Skeldon	(substituted off) 64'
LP	1	Leah Bartlett	(substituted off) 75'
Replacements:
HK	16	Jodie Rettie	(substituted in) 64'
PR	17	Anne Young	(substituted in) 75'
PR	18	Elliann Clarke	(substituted in) 58'
LK	19	Eva Donaldson	(substituted in) 56'
FL	20	Rachel McLachlan	(substituted in) 47'
SH	21	Mairi McDonald	(substituted in) 58'
CE	22	Meryl Smith	(substituted in) 67'
WG	23	Coreen Grant	(substituted in) 9'
Coach:
(Scotland) Bryan Easson

Player of the Match:
Mélissande Llorens (France)

Assistant referees:
Clara Munarini (Italy)
Katherine Ritchie (England)
Television match official:
Leo Colgan (Ireland)

Notes:

- No replacement was issued for Emma Orr when she came off in the 77th minute.

=== Round 4 ===
22 April 2023
14:15 IST (UTC+1)

Ireland	0–48	England (1 BP)
	Report	Try: Beckett 2' c Heard 16' m Kildunne 21' m M. Packer 26' m Talling 36' c Reed 71' c Matthews (2) 78' c, 80' +3 c Con: Tuima (1/5) 37'; Rowland (3/3) 72', 78', 80' +3

Musgrave Park, Cork
Attendance: 5,309
Referee: Lauren Jenner (New Zealand)

FB	15	Lauren Delany
RW	14	Aoife Doyle
OC	13	Aoife Dalton			(substituted off) 54'
IC	12	Vicky A. Irwin	35' to 40'
LW	11	Natasja Behan	(substituted off) 67'
FH	10	Dannah O'Brien
SH	9	Molly Scuffil-McCabe	(substituted off) 65'
N8	8	Deirbhile Nic a Bháird
OF	7	Grace Moore	(substituted off) 56'
BF	6	Brittany Hogan	(substituted off) 67'
RL	5	Sam Monaghan
LL	4	Nichola Fryday (c)
TP	3	Christy Haney	(substituted off) 78'
HK	2	Neve Jones	(substituted off) 65'
LP	1	Linda Djougang	(substituted off) 29'
Replacements:
HK	16	Clara Nielson	(substituted in) 65'
PR	17	Sadhbh McGrath	(substituted in) 78'
PR	18	Kathryn Buggy	(substituted in) 29'
LK	19	Hannah O'Connor	(substituted in) 67'
FL	20	Jo Brown	(substituted in) 56'
SH	21	Aisla Hughes	(substituted off) 65'
CE	22	Anna McGann	(substituted in) 35'	(substituted off) 40'	(substituted in) 54'
FB	23	Méabh Deely	(substituted in) 67'
Coach:
(Ireland) Greg McWilliams

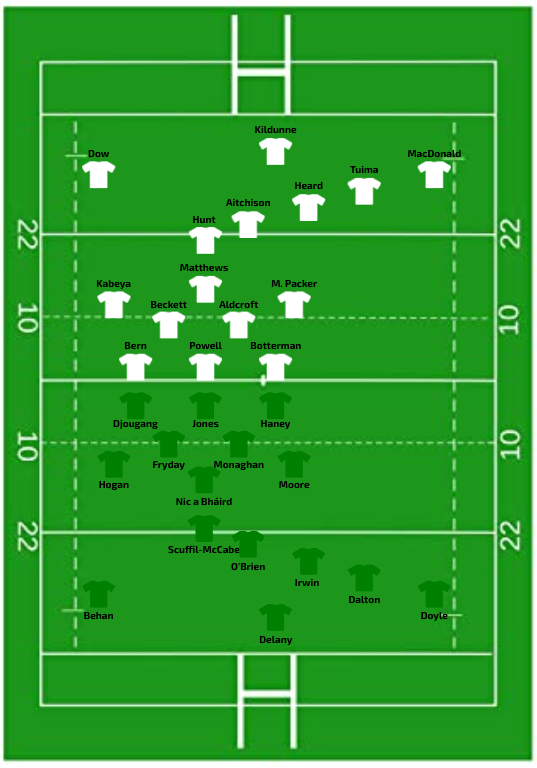

FB	15	Ellie Kildunne
RW	14	Abigail Dow
OC	13	Lagi Tuima	(substituted off) 53'
IC	12	Tatyana Heard	(substituted off) 53'
LW	11	Claudia MacDonald
FH	10	Holly Aitchison
SH	9	Natasha Hunt	(substituted off) 65'
N8	8	Alex Matthews
OF	7	Marlie Packer (c)	(substituted off) 35'
BF	6	Sadia Kabeya
RL	5	Sarah Beckett
LL	4	Zoe Aldcroft	(substituted off) 53'
TP	3	Maud Muir	(substituted off) 61'
HK	2	Connie Powell	(substituted off) 61'
LP	1	Hannah Botterman	(substituted off) 29'
Replacements:
HK	16	Lark Davies	(substituted in) 61'
PR	17	Mackenzie Carson	(substituted in) 29'
PR	18	Sarah Bern	(substituted in) 61'
LK	19	Delaney Burns	(substituted in) 53'
FL	20	Morwenna Talling	(substituted in) 35'
SH	21	Lucy Packer	(substituted in) 65'
CE	22	Amber Reed	(substituted in) 53'
FB	23	Helena Rowland	(substituted in) 53'
Coach:
(England) Simon Middleton

Player of the Match:
Sarah Beckett (England)

Assistant referees:
Beatrice Benvenuti (Italy)
Maria Pacifico (Italy)
Television match official:
Andre McMenemy (Scotland)

Notes:

- By playing against England, Jo Brown became the first woman to play both for and against England and Ireland in an Anglo-Irish match.
- Nicole Cronin was originally named on the bench for Ireland, but withdrew due to injury. She was replaced by Ailsa Hughes.
- England secured their 23rd Triple Crown, having won it all times previously since 2016.

22 April 2023
16:45 BST (UTC+1)

(1 BP) Scotland	29–21	Italy
Try: McMillan 12' m Skeldon (2) 36' m, 68' m Bartlett (2) 47' c, 52' c Con: Nelson (2/5) 48', 54'	Report	Try: Franco 30' c Tounesi 58' c Vecchini 61' c Con: Sillari (3/3) 31', 59', 62'

Edinburgh Rugby Stadium, Edinburgh
Attendance: 3,638
Referee: Aurélie Groizeleau (France)

FB	15	Chloe Rollie
RW	14	Coreen Grant
OC	13	Lisa Thomson
IC	12	Meryl Smith
LW	11	Francesca McGhie
FH	10	Helen Nelson
SH	9	Mairi McDonald	(substituted off) 60'
N8	8	Evie Gallagher
OF	7	Rachel McLachlan
BF	6	Rachel Malcolm (c)
RL	5	Louise McMillan
LL	4	Jade Konkel-Roberts	(substituted off) 65'	(substituted in) 77'
TP	3	Christine Belisle
HK	2	Lana Skeldon
LP	1	Leah Bartlett
Replacements:
HK	16	Jodie Rettie
PR	17	Anne Young
PR	18	Elliann Clarke
LK	19	Eva Donaldson	(substituted in) 65'	(substituted off) 77'
N8	20	Eilidh Sinclair
SH	21	Caity Mattinson	(substituted in) 60'
FH	22	Beth Blacklock
WG	23	Liz Musgrove
Coach:
(Scotland) Bryan Easson

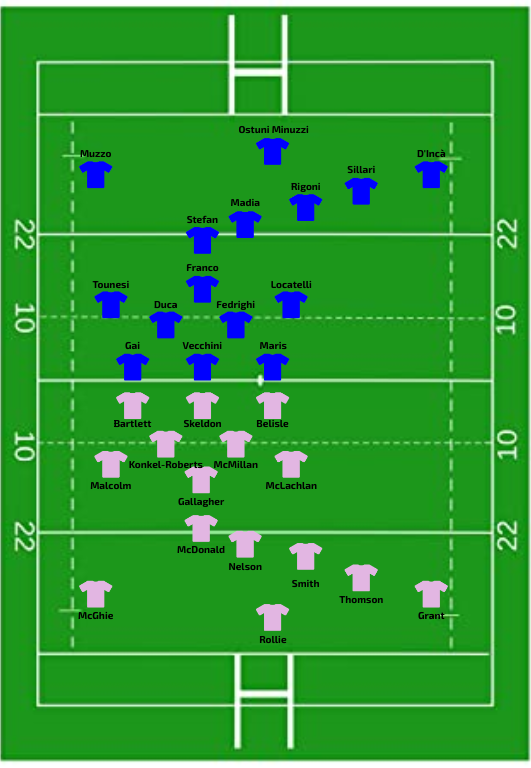

FB	15	Vittoria Ostuni Minuzzi
RW	14	Aura Muzzo		(substituted off) 54'
OC	13	Michela Sillari		(substituted off) 72'
IC	12	Beatrice Rigoni
LW	11	Alyssa D'Incà		(substituted off) 70'
FH	10	Veronica Madia
SH	9	Sofia Stefan (c)
N8	8	Giada Franco
OF	7	Isabella Locatelli		(substituted off) 62'
BF	6	Sara Tounesi
RL	5	Giordana Duca	(yellow card) 35' to 45'
LL	4	Valeria Fedrighi		(substituted off) 73'
TP	3	Lucia Gai		(substituted off) 60'
HK	2	Vittoria Vecchini
LP	1	Gaia Maris
Replacements:
HK	16	Emanuela Stecca
PR	17	Alice Cassaghi		(substituted in) 73'
PR	18	Sara Seye	(red card) 65'	(substituted in) 60'
LK	19	Laura Gurioli
FL	20	Alissa Ranuccini		(substituted in) 62'
SH	21	Sara Barattin		(substituted in) 54'
CE	22	Emma Stevanin		(substituted in) 72'
WG	23	Francesca Granzotto		(substituted in) 70'
Coach:
(Italy) Giovanni Raineri

Player of the Match:
Jade Konkel-Roberts (Scotland)

Assistant referees:
Joy Neville (Ireland)
Adele Roberts (Belgium)
Television match official:
Ian Tempest (England)

Notes:

- Lisa Thomson (Scotland) earned her 50th test cap.
- This was Scotland's first Women's Six Nations victory since defeating Wales 27–20 in 2021. It is also the first victory over Italy since defeating them 14–12 in the 2017 tournament.

23 April 2023
15:15 CEST (UTC+2)

(1 BP) France	39–14	Wales
Try: R. Ménager 1' c Hermet 10' c Llorens (2) 25' c, 40' +1 m Escudero 44' m Bernadou 78' m Con: Trémoulière (3/6) 3', 11', 26'; Pen: Trémoulière (1/1) 6'	Report	Try: G. Evans 52' c Pyrs 57' c Con: Snowsill (2/2) 53', 58'

Stade des Alpes, Grenoble
Attendance: 18,604
Referee: Clara Munarini (Italy)

FB	15	Émilie Boulard	(substituted off) 61'
RW	14	Cyrielle Banet
OC	13	Marine Ménager	(substituted off) 68'
IC	12	Gabrielle Vernier
LW	11	Mélissande Llorens
FH	10	Jessy Trémoulière
SH	9	Alexandra Chambon	(substituted off) 75'
N8	8	Romane Ménager
OF	7	Gaëlle Hermet
BF	6	Charlotte Escudero	(substituted off) 53'
RL	5	Audrey Forlani (c)	(substituted off) 58'
LL	4	Maëlle Picut
TP	3	Assia Khalfaoui	(substituted off) 53'
HK	2	Agathe Sochat	(substituted off) 76'
LP	1	Yllana Brosseau	(substituted off) 68'
Replacements:
HK	16	Élisa Riffonneau	(substituted in) 76'
PR	17	Ambre Mwayembe	(substituted in) 68'
PR	18	Rose Bernadou	(substituted in) 53'
LK	19	Manaé Feleu	(substituted in) 58'
N8	20	Émeline Gros	(substituted in) 53'
SH	21	Margaux Duces	(substituted in) 76'
FH	22	Carla Arbez	(substituted in) 61'
CE	23	Maëlle Filopon	(substituted in) 68'
Coach:
(France) Gaëlle Mignot (France) David Ortiz

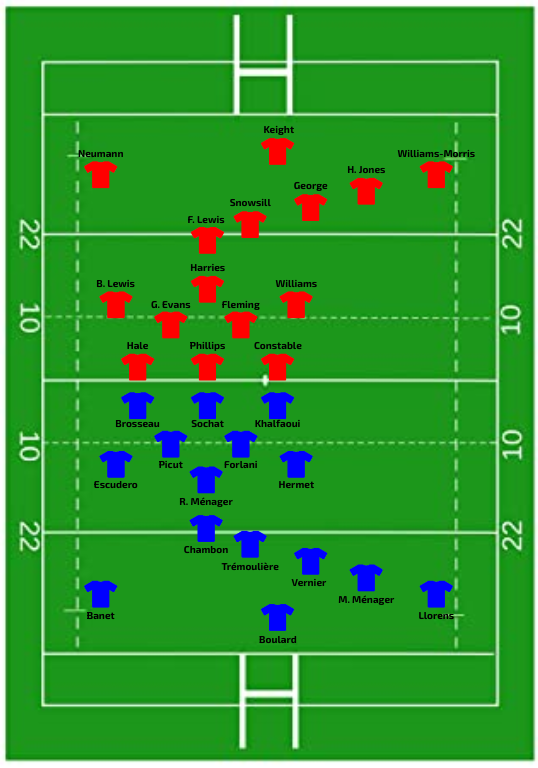

FB	15	Courtney Keight
RW	14	Lisa Neumann
OC	13	Hannah Jones (c)
IC	12	Lleucu George
LW	11	Carys Williams-Morris		(substituted off) 76'
FH	10	Elinor Snowsill		(substituted off) 76'
SH	9	Ffion Lewis		(substituted off) 56'
N8	8	Sioned Harries	(yellow card) 15' to 25'	(substituted off) 80'
OF	7	Kate Williams
BF	6	Bethan Lewis		(substituted off) 56'
RL	5	Georgia Evans
LL	4	Abbie Fleming
TP	3	Cerys Hale		24' to 37'		(substituted off) 56'
HK	2	Carys Phillips		(substituted off) 56'
LP	1	Abbey Constable		(substituted off) 56'
Replacements:
HK	16	Kelsey Jones		(substituted in) 56'
PR	17	Gwenllian Pyrs		(substituted in) 56'
PR	18	Sisilia Tuipulotu		(substituted in) 24'	(substituted off) 37'	(substituted in) 56'
LK	19	Bryonie King		(substituted in) 80'
N8	20	Alex Callender		(substituted in) 56'
SH	21	Keira Bevan		(substituted in) 56'
FH	22	Robyn Wilkins		(substituted in) 76'
FB	23	Niamh Terry		(substituted in) 76'
Coach:
(Wales) Ioan Cunningham

Player of the Match:
Gaëlle Hermet (France)

Assistant referees:
Katherine Ritchie (England)
Mary Pringle (Scotland)
Television match official:
Matteo Liperini (Italy)

Notes:

- Abbey Constable (Wales) made her international debut.
- The attendance of 18,604 was a new Women's Six Nations record, surpassing the 15,683 spectators in attendance for the England v Ireland match the previous year.

=== Round 5 ===
29 April 2023
13:00 BST (UTC+1)

(1 BP) England	38–33	France (2 BP)
Try: Dow 17' m M. Packer 26' c Matthews 32' c Penalty try 36'; Aldcroft 40' +2 c Davies 60' m Con: Rowland (3/5) 26', 33', 40' +3	Report	Try: Boulard 49' c Vernier 56' c Escudero 66' c Gros 76' m Banet 80' c Con: Trémoulière (3/4) 50', 57', 67'; Arbez (1/1) 80' +1

Twickenham Stadium, London
Attendance: 58,498
Referee: Aimee Barrett-Theron (South Africa)

FB	15	Ellie Kildunne
RW	14	Abigail Dow
OC	13	Helena Rowland
IC	12	Tatyana Heard	(substituted off) 67'
LW	11	Claudia MacDonald	(substituted off) 50'
FH	10	Holly Aitchison
SH	9	Lucy Packer	(substituted off) 77'
N8	8	Alex Matthews
OF	7	Marlie Packer (c)
BF	6	Sadia Kabeya	(substituted off) 75'
RL	5	Sarah Beckett	(substituted off) 57'
LL	4	Zoe Aldcroft
TP	3	Sarah Bern	(substituted off) 67'
HK	2	Lark Davies	(substituted off) 67'
LP	1	Hannah Botterman	(substituted off) 50'
Replacements:
HK	16	Connie Powell	(substituted in) 67'
PR	17	Mackenzie Carson	(substituted in) 50'
PR	18	Maud Muir	(substituted in) 67'
LK	19	Poppy Cleall	(substituted in) 57'
FL	20	Morwenna Talling	(substituted in) 75'
SH	21	Natasha Hunt	(substituted in) 77'
FH	22	Amber Reed	(substituted in) 67'
WG	23	Jess Breach	(substituted in) 50'
Coach:
(England) Simon Middleton

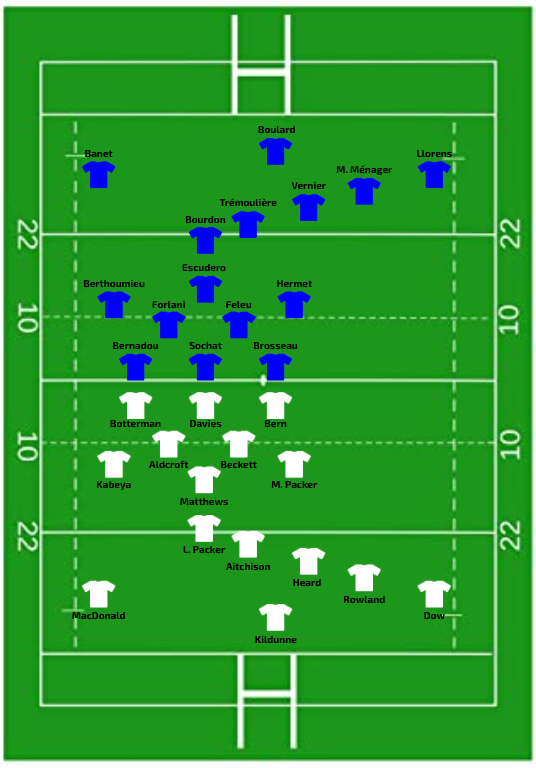

FB	15	Émilie Boulard		(substituted off) 70'
RW	14	Cyrielle Banet
OC	13	Marine Ménager		(substituted off) 72'
IC	12	Gabrielle Vernier
LW	11	Mélissande Llorens
FH	10	Jessy Trémoulière	(yellow card) 32' to 40'
SH	9	Pauline Bourdon		(substituted off) 70'
N8	8	Charlotte Escudero
OF	7	Gaëlle Hermet
BF	6	Axelle Berthoumieu		(substituted off) 40'	(substituted in) 47'	(substituted off) 67'
RL	5	Audrey Forlani (c)		(substituted off) 47'
LL	4	Manaé Feleu
TP	3	Rose Bernadou	(yellow card) 36' to 47'		(substituted off) 47'
HK	2	Agathe Sochat
LP	1	Yllana Brosseau		(substituted off) 61'
Replacements:
HK	16	Élisa Riffonneau
PR	17	Ambre Mwayembe		(substituted in) 61'
PR	18	Assia Khalfaoui		(substituted in) 40'
FL	19	Romane Ménager		(substituted in) 47'
N8	20	Émeline Gros				(substituted in) 67'
SH	21	Alexandra Chambon		(substituted in) 70'
FH	22	Carla Arbez		(substituted in) 70'
CE	23	Maëlle Filopon		(substituted in) 72'
Coach:
(France) Gaëlle Mignot (France) David Ortiz

Player of the Match:
Sadia Kabeya (England)

Assistant referees:
Lauren Jenner (New Zealand)
Maria Heitor (Portugal)
Television match official:
Ben Whitehouse (Wales)

Notes:

- This was the 78th and final test match for Jessy Trémoulière (France) who announced her retirement before the beginning of the tournament.
- This was the 86th and final game for Simon Middleton as England head coach, who had been in charge since 2015.
- As a result of this match, England won their 19th Women's Six Nations title (their 5th in succession) and their 17th Grand Slam.
- This was England's first standalone fixture to be played at Twickenham.
- The attendance of 58,498 set a new world record for the highest attendance at a women's rugby union match, surpassing the attendance of 42,579 at the World Cup final the previous year.

29 April 2023
15:30 CEST (UTC+2)

Italy	10–36	Wales (1 BP)
Try: Madia 26' c Con: Sillari (1/1) 27'; Pen: Sillari (1/1) 33'	Report	Try: B. Lewis 24' c Tuipulotu 38' c Harries 50' c Callender 60' m Lake 70' c Con: Bevan (3/4) 25', 39', 51'; Snowsill 71'; Pen: Bevan (1/1) 7'

Stadio Sergio Lanfranchi, Parma
Attendance: 3,213
Referee: Joy Neville (Ireland)

FB	15	Vittoria Ostuni Minuzzi
RW	14	Aura Muzzo
OC	13	Michela Sillari	(substituted off) 74'
IC	12	Beatrice Rigoni
LW	11	Alyssa D'Incà
FH	10	Veronica Madia	(substituted off) 58'
SH	9	Sara Barattin (c)	(substituted off) 50'
N8	8	Giada Franco	(substituted off) 55'
OF	7	Isabella Locatelli
BF	6	Sara Tounesi
RL	5	Giordana Duca
LL	4	Valeria Fedrighi	(substituted off) 78'
TP	3	Lucia Gai	(substituted off) 55'
HK	2	Vittoria Vecchini
LP	1	Gaia Maris	(substituted off) 55'
Replacements:
HK	16	Emanuela Stecca	(substituted in) 55'
PR	17	Alice Cassaghi	(substituted in) 55'
PR	18	Alessia Pilani
LK	19	Laura Gurioli	(substituted in) 55'
FL	20	Alissa Ranuccini	(substituted in) 78'
SH	21	Sofia Stefan	(substituted in) 51'
CE	22	Emma Stevanin	(substituted in) 58'
FB	23	Beatrice Capomaggi	(substituted in) 74'
Coach:
(Italy) Giovanni Raineri

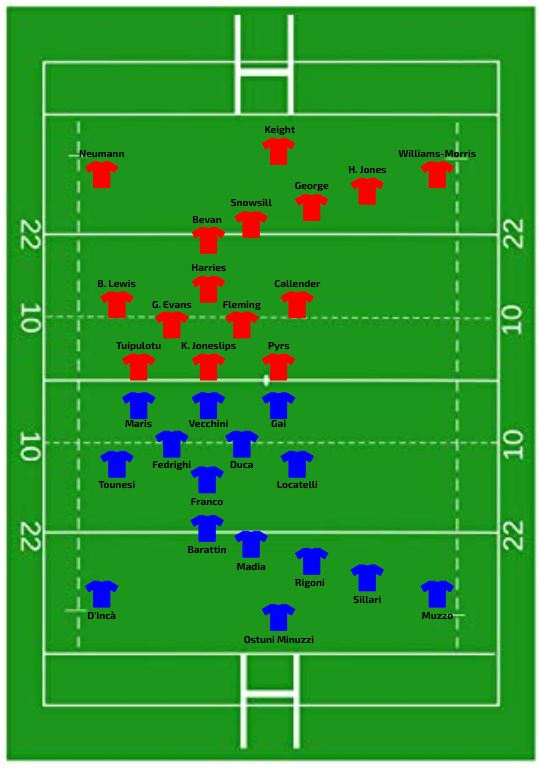

FB	15	Courtney Keight
RW	14	Lisa Neumann
OC	13	Hannah Jones (c)		(substituted off) 77'
IC	12	Lleucu George	(substituted off) 56'	(substituted in) 77'
LW	11	Carys Williams-Morris	(substituted off) 76'
FH	10	Elinor Snowsill
SH	9	Keira Bevan	(substituted off) 65'
N8	8	Sioned Harries	(substituted off) 56'
OF	7	Alex Callender
BF	6	Bethan Lewis
RL	5	Georgia Evans	(substituted off) 76'
LL	4	Abbie Fleming
TP	3	Sisilia Tuipulotu	(substituted off) 71'
HK	2	Kelsey Jones	(substituted off) 62'
LP	1	Gwenllian Pyrs	(substituted off) 71'
Replacements:
HK	16	Carys Phillips	(substituted in) 62'
PR	17	Caryl Thomas	(substituted in) 71'
PR	18	Cerys Hale	(substituted in) 71'
LK	19	Bryonie King	(substituted in) 76'
FL	20	Kate Williams	(substituted in) 56'
SH	21	Ffion Lewis	(substituted in) 65'
CE	22	Kerin Lake	(substituted in) 56'
WG	23	Amelia Tutt	(substituted in) 76'
Coach:
(Wales) Ioan Cunningham

Player of the Match:
Alex Callender (Wales)

Assistant referees:
Aurélie Groizeleau (France)
Mary Pringle (Scotland)
Television match official:
Ben Blain (Scotland)

Notes:

- Amelia Tutt (Wales) made her international debut.
- This was the final test match for Sara Barattin (Italy) and Caryl Thomas (Wales), respectively with 116 and 65 caps, who announced their retirements before the beginning of the tournament.

29 April 2023
19:30 BST (UTC+1)

(1 BP) Scotland	36–10	Ireland
Try: Smith 40' +1 m Skeldon 48' m Bartlett 57' m McGhie 66' c Malcolm 75' c Rollie 80' +2 m Con: Nelson (3/6) 59', 67', 76'	Report	Try: Fryday 54' c Con: O'Brien (1/1) 55'; Pen: O'Brien (1/1) 6'

Edinburgh Rugby Stadium, Edinburgh
Attendance: 4,862
Referee: Sara Cox (England)

FB	15	Chloe Rollie
RW	14	Coreen Grant
OC	13	Emma Orr
IC	12	Meryl Smith	(substituted off) 77'
LW	11	Francesca McGhie	(substituted off) 77'
FH	10	Helen Nelson
SH	9	Mairi McDonald	(substituted off) 57'
N8	8	Evie Gallagher
OF	7	Rachel McLachlan
BF	6	Rachel Malcolm (c)	(substituted off) 72'
RL	5	Louise McMillan	(substituted off) 72'
LL	4	Jade Konkel-Roberts
TP	3	Christine Belisle	(substituted off) 77'
HK	2	Lana Skeldon	(substituted off) 77'
LP	1	Leah Bartlett	(substituted off) 77'
Replacements:
HK	16	Jodie Rettie	(substituted in) 77'
PR	17	Anne Young	(substituted in) 77'
PR	18	Elliann Clarke	(substituted in) 77'
LK	19	Eva Donaldson	(substituted in) 72'
FL	20	Eilidh Sinclair	(substituted in) 72'
SH	21	Caity Mattinson	(substituted in) 57'
FH	22	Beth Blacklock	(substituted in) 77'
WG	23	Liz Musgrove	(substituted in) 77'
Coach:
(Scotland) Bryan Easson

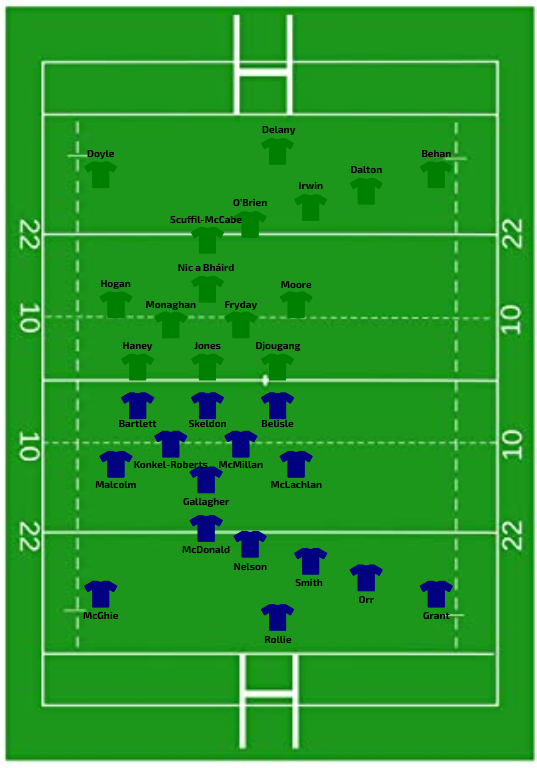

FB	15	Lauren Delany
RW	14	Aoife Doyle	(substituted off) 70'
OC	13	Aoife Dalton
IC	12	Vicky A. Irwin	(substituted off) 51'
LW	11	Natasja Behan
FH	10	Dannah O'Brien
SH	9	Molly Scuffil-McCabe	(substituted off) 59'
N8	8	Deirbhile Nic a Bháird
OF	7	Grace Moore	(substituted off) 16'
BF	6	Brittany Hogan	(substituted off) 65'
RL	5	Sam Monaghan
LL	4	Nichola Fryday (c)
TP	3	Christy Haney	(substituted off) 69'
HK	2	Neve Jones	(substituted off) 77'
LP	1	Linda Djougang	(substituted off) 77'
Replacements:
HK	16	Clara Nielson	(substituted in) 77'
PR	17	Sadhbh McGrath	(substituted in) 69'
PR	18	Kathryn Buggy	(substituted in) 77'
LK	19	Hannah O'Connor	(substituted in) 65'
FL	20	Dorothy Wall	(substituted in) 16'
SH	21	Ailsa Hughes	(substituted in) 59'
CE	22	Anna McGann	(substituted in) 51'
FB	23	Méabh Deely	(substituted in) 70'
Coach:
(Ireland) Greg McWilliams

Player of the Match:
Meryl Smith (Scotland)

Assistant referees:
Clara Munarini
Katherine Ritchie (England)
Television match official:
Matteo Liperini (Italy)

Notes:

- Ireland's defeat meant that they claimed the wooden spoon for the first time since 2004. As this was their fifth successive defeat and as the men had won the Grand Slam the same year, this was the first year in which one senior team for the same country won all five games and the other lost all five games.

== Statistics ==
=== Top points scorers ===
Pos	Name	Team	Pts
1	Marlie Packer	England	35
2	Abigail Dow	England	30
3	Jessy Trémoulière	France	29
4	Keira Bevan	Wales	27
5	Gabrielle Vernier	France	25
6	Michela Sillari	Italy	22
7	Jess Breach	England	20
7	Tatyana Heard	England	20
7	Claudia MacDonald	England	20
7	Émilie Boulard	France	20
7	Lana Skeldon	Scotland	20
7	Charlotte Escudero	France	20
7	Sisilia Tuipulotu	Wales	20

=== Top try scorers ===
Pos	Name	Team	Tries
1	Marlie Packer	England	7
2	Abigail Dow	England	6
3	Gabrielle Vernier	France	5
4	Claudia MacDonald	England	4
4	Jess Breach	England	4
4	Tatyana Heard	England	4
4	Émilie Boulard	France	4
4	Charlotte Escudero	France	4
4	Sisilia Tuipulotu	Wales	4
4	Lana Skeldon	Scotland	4

== Broadcast ==
Country	Broadcaster
Australia	Stan Sport
United Kingdom	BBC Sport
France	France TV
Republic of Ireland	RTÉ; Virgin Media Television
Italy	Sky Sport Italia
