= List of 2024–25 Premiership Women's Rugby transfers =

This is a list of player transfers involving Premiership Women's Rugby teams before or during the 2024–25 season.

The list consists of permanent player movements or temporary loan deals that have been officially confirmed, and are either to or from one of the nine teams competing in Premiership Women's Rugby in 2024–25. It is not unknown for confirmed transfers to be cancelled at a later date.

== Bristol Bears ==
=== Players in ===
- (Scotland) Emma Orr from (Scotland) Heriots Blues
- (Wales) Jasmine Joyce-Butchers from (United Kingdom) Great Britain Sevens
- (England) Tilly Ryall from (England) Hartpury College
- (England) Lauren Bailey (promoted from Academy)
- (England) Lottie Ball (promoted from Academy)
- (England) Emma Hawkins (promoted from Academy)
- (Wales) Stella Orrin (promoted from Academy)
- (England) Heidi Pashaui-Tarighoun (promoted from Academy)
- (England) Darcy Reed (promoted from Academy)
- (England) Fearne-Maia White (promoted from Academy)
- Ilona Maher from United States Sevens
- (Wales) Ffion Lewis from (Wales) Brython Thunder (short-term deal)

=== Players out ===
- (Wales) Gwenllian Pyrs to (England) Sale Sharks
- (Ireland) Claire Molloy (retired)
- (England) Grace White to (England) Trailfinders
- (England) Lucie Skuse (released)
- (England) Maisie Darby-Jones (released)
- (England) Grace Crompton to (England) Harlequins
- (Wales) Kayleigh Powell to (England) Harlequins
- (Wales) Megan Davies to (England) Gloucester-Hartpury

== Exeter Chiefs ==
=== Players in ===
- (New Zealand) Zara Feaunati (unattached)
- (England) Flo Robinson from (England) Harlequins
- (England) Emily Robinson from (England) Harlequins
- (Canada) Stef Evans from (England) Leicester Tigers
- (England) Molly Saunders from (England) Sutton & Epsom
- (New Zealand) Liv McGoverne from (New Zealand) Matatū
- (Canada) Mikiela Nelson from (Canada) Capilano
- (England) Georgina Tasker from (England) Loughborough Lightning
- (England) Flo Long (unattached)
- (Australia) Lori Cramer from (Australia) Queensland Reds
- (United States) Charli Jacoby from (Australia) Queensland Reds
- (England) Lucy Nye from (England) Leicester Tigers
- (Ireland) Dorothy Wall from (Ireland) Munster
- Taylor Perry from Canada Sevens
- (Canada) Sabrina Poulin from (Canada) Mount Royal
- (Germany) Nora Baltruweit from (France) Stade Bordelais

=== Players out ===
- (England) Harriet Millar-Mills to (England) Harlequins
- (England) Lizzie Hanlon to (England) Harlequins
- (United States) Olivia Ortiz to (England) Sale Sharks
- (Wales) Robyn Wilkins to (England) Sale Sharks
- (England) Brooke Bradley to (England) Trailfinders
- (England) Molly Saunders (released)

== Gloucester-Hartpury ==
=== Players in ===
- (Wales) Sian Jones from (England) Sale Sharks
- (England) Jade Shekells from (United Kingdom) Great Britain Sevens
- (Wales) Carys Williams-Morris from (England) Loughborough Lightning
- (England) Ellie Green from (England) Trailfinders
- (Scotland) Lisa Cockburn from (England) Leicester Tigers
- (England) Charlie Woodman from (New Zealand) Matatū
- (England) Beth Stafford (unattached)
- (Canada) Gillian Boag from (Canada) Capilano
- (Wales) Megan Davies from (England) Bristol Bears

=== Players out ===
- (England) Evie Roach to (England) Sale Sharks
- (Wales) Cerys Hale (retired)
- (Spain) Laura Delgado to (England) Harlequins
- (England) Trudy Cowan to (England) Sale Sharks
- (Scotland) Caity Mattinson to (England) Trailfinders
- (Wales) Kerin Lake (released)
- (England) Ellie Gilbert (released)
- (Canada) Jayne Isherwood (retired)
- (England) Tiana Gordon to (England) Leicester Tigers
- (Jamaica) Jordan Russell to (England) Leicester Tigers
- (Wales) Abbey Constable to (England) Leicester Tigers
- (England) Emma Mundy to (England) Leicester Tigers
- (Scotland) Leia Brebner-Holden to (England) Loughborough Lightning

== Harlequins ==
=== Players in ===
- (England) Harriet Millar-Mills from (England) Exeter Chiefs
- (England) Lizzie Hanlon from (England) Exeter Chiefs
- (Spain) Clàudia Peña from (Spain) Barcelona
- (Sweden) Maja Meuller from (England) Loughborough Lightning
- (Canada) Sara Svoboda from (England) Loughborough Lightning
- (Spain) Laura Delgado from (England) Gloucester-Hartpury
- (Wales) Alex Callender from (Wales) Brython Thunder
- (Scotland) Nic Haynes from (England) Saracens
- (Ireland) Emma Swords from (England) Trailfinders
- (England) Jemima Moss from (England) Leicester Tigers
- (England) Ruby Winstanley (promoted from Academy)
- (England) Zara Green (promoted from Academy)
- (England) Iley Bailey (promoted from Academy)
- (England) Sarah Parry from (England) Worcester Warriors
- (England) Grace Crompton from (England) Bristol Bears
- (Wales) Kayleigh Powell from (England) Bristol Bears
- (Canada) Maddy Grant from (Canada) Ottawa Gee-Gees (short-term deal)
- (Netherlands) Isa Prins from (Netherlands) DIOK Leiden (short-term deal)

=== Players out ===
- (England) Shaunagh Brown (retired)
- (England) Rachael Burford (retired)
- (England) Emily Scott (retired)
- (England) Katy Mew (retired)
- (England) Georgia Gray (retired)
- (England) Flo Robinson to (England) Exeter Chiefs
- (England) Emily Robinson to (England) Exeter Chiefs
- (England) Rosie Dobson to (England) Trailfinders
- (England) Hannah Owen to (England) Trailfinders
- (Scotland) Nic Haynes to (England) Saracens

== Leicester Tigers ==
=== Players in ===
- (England) Elin Beaver from (England) Worcester Wanderers
- (England) Abi Bowes from (England) Scarborough Valkyries
- (England) Tiana Gordon from (England) Gloucester-Hartpury
- (England) Leah Heath from (England) Kenilworth
- (United States) Emily Henrich (unattached)
- (Scotland) Jenny Maxwell from (England) Loughborough Lightning
- (Finland) Eeva Pohjanheimo from (England) Cheltenham Tigers
- (Jamaica) Jordan Russell from (England) Gloucester-Hartpury
- (England) Ellie Smith from (England) Lichfield
- (England) Sophie Benavent from (England) Worcester Wanderers
- (Wales) Abbey Constable from (England) Gloucester-Hartpury
- (England) Emma Mundy from (England) Gloucester-Hartpury
- (England) Zainab Alema from (England) Richmond (short-term deal)
- (Scotland) Nikki Simpson from (Scotland) Glasgow Warriors (short-term deal)

=== Players out ===
- (England) Ofure Ugiagbe (retired)
- (England) Becky Noon (retired)
- (Canada) Stef Evans to (England) Exeter Chiefs
- (Scotland) Elis Martin to (England) Loughborough Lightning
- (England) Lucy Nye to (England) Exeter Chiefs
- (England) Jemima Moss to (England) Harlequins
- (Scotland) Lisa Cockburn to (England) Gloucester-Hartpury

== Loughborough Lightning ==
=== Players in ===
- Alev Kelter from United States Sevens
- (England) Alicia Maude from (United Kingdom) Great Britain Sevens
- (Scotland) Elis Martin from (England) Leicester Tigers
- (Scotland) Anne Young from (England) Sale Sharks
- Krissy Scurfield from Canada Sevens
- (Scotland) Cieron Bell from (Scotland) Edinburgh
- (England) Haineala Lutui from (England) Worcester Warriors
- (England) Grace Deane from (England) Cheltenham Tigers
- (England) Francesca Goldthorp from (Australia) North Queensland Cowboys
- (Scotland) Leia Brebner-Holden from (England) Gloucester-Hartpury

=== Players out ===
- (England) Katie Trevarthen (released)
- (England) Jess Weaver (released)
- (Wales) Carys Williams-Morris (released)
- (Sweden) Maja Meuller to (England) Harlequins
- (Canada) Sara Svoboda to (England) Harlequins
- (England) Georgina Tasker to (England) Exeter Chiefs
- (Scotland) Chloe Rollie to (England) Trailfinders
- (Wales) Carys Williams-Morris to (England) Gloucester-Hartpury
- (England) Sally Williams to (England) Trailfinders
- (England) Emma Hardy to (England) Saracens
- (Scotland) Jenny Maxwell to (England) Leicester Tigers

== Sale Sharks ==
=== Players in ===
- Alba Capell from Spain Sevens
- (England) Evie Roach from (England) Gloucester-Hartpury
- (United States) Olivia Ortiz from (England) Exeter Chiefs
- (Scotland) Rachel Phillips from (Scotland) Edinburgh
- (Wales) Robyn Wilkins from (England) Exeter Chiefs
- (Wales) Gwenllian Pyrs from (England) Bristol Bears
- (England) Trudy Cowan from (England) Gloucester-Hartpury
- (Italy) Sofia Stefan from (Italy) Valsugana Padova

=== Players out ===
- (Japan) Minori Yamamoto (released)
- (United States) Eti Haungatau (released)
- (Scotland) Anne Young (released)
- (Italy) Sara Tounesi (released)
- (Scotland) Rachel McLachlan (released)
- (Ireland) Leah Lyons (retired)
- (Scotland) Sarah Law (retired)
- (United States) Alycia Washington (released)
- (Wales) Sian Jones to (England) Gloucester-Hartpury
- (Scotland) Evie Tonkin to (England) Sale FC 1861
- (Scotland) Anne Young to (England) Loughborough Lightning

== Saracens ==
=== Players in ===
- (England) Emma Hardy from (England) Loughborough Lightning
- (England) Charlotte Wright-Haley from (England) Trailfinders
- (Canada) Gabby Senft from (France) Stade Bordelais
- (England) Emily Eves (promoted from Academy)
- (England) Madison Lawrence (promoted from Academy)
- (England) Keira Muir (promoted from Academy)
- (Canada) Fancy Bermudez from (Canada) Westshore
- Alysha Corrigan from Canada Sevens
- (Wales) Natalia John from (Wales) Brython Thunder
- (England) Chantelle Miell (unattached)
- (Scotland) Nic Haynes from (England) Harlequins

=== Players out ===
- (England) Sonia Green (retired)
- (Scotland) Nic Haynes to (England) Harlequins
- (England) Anna Goddard (retired)
- (Ireland) Grace Moore to (England) Trailfinders
- (Ireland) Niamh Gallagher to (England) Trailfinders
- (Canada) Emma Taylor to (England) Trailfinders
- (England) Leanne Infante (retired)
- (Scotland) Isla Alejandro to (United States) Chicago Tempest (short-term loan)

== Trailfinders ==
=== Players in ===
- (Scotland) Chloe Rollie from (England) Loughborough Lightning
- (England) Rosie Dobson from (England) Harlequins
- (England) Kaylee McHugh from (England) Thurrock T-Birds
- (England) Grace White from (England) Bristol Bears
- (Canada) Kendra Cousineau from (Canada) Guelph Gryphons
- (Scotland) Caity Mattinson from (England) Gloucester-Hartpury
- (England) Brooke Bradley from (England) Exeter Chiefs
- (Ireland) Grace Moore from (England) Saracens
- (Scotland) Sarah Denholm from (Scotland) Edinburgh
- (England) Hannah Owen from (England) Harlequins
- (Scotland) Lisa Thomson from (United Kingdom) Great Britain Sevens
- (England) Sally Williams from (England) Loughborough Lightning
- (Ireland) Niamh Gallagher from (England) Saracens
- (Canada) Emma Taylor from (England) Saracens
- (England) Hollie Williamson from (England) Richmond
- (United States) Alivia Leatherman from (United States) Life West Gladiatrix
- (England) Hayley Jones from (England) Henley College
- (United States) Paige Stathopoulos from (United States) Beantown (short-term deal)

=== Players out ===
- (France) Élisa Riffonneau (released)
- (Italy) Sofia Rolfi (released)
- (United States) Meya Bizer (released)
- (England) Courtney Pursglove (released)
- (Ireland) Megan Brodie (released)
- (England) Lou Dodd (released)
- (England) Sophie Shams (released)
- (England) Sian McGuinness (released)
- (England) Lauren Brooks (released)
- (England) Jo Bucknall (released)
- (Ireland) Emma Swords to (England) Harlequins
- (England) Charlotte Wright-Haley to (England) Saracens
- (England) Ellie Green to (England) Gloucester-Hartpury
