= Elliann Clarke =

Scotland international rugby union player

- Born: 16 February 2001 (age 25) Heriot, Scotland
- Height: 165 cm (5 ft 5 in)
- Weight: 85 kg (187 lb; 13 st 5 lb)

Rugby union career
- Position: Prop
Senior career
Years	Team	Apps	(Points)
2023–	Bristol Bears	20	(0)
International career
Years	Team	Apps	(Points)
2022–	Scotland	24	(0)

Elliann Clarke (born 16 February 2001) is a Scottish rugby union player. She competed for Scotland at the 2021 and 2025 Women's Rugby World Cups.

== Early career ==
Clarke was born in Heriot, Scotland. She began playing rugby union at Dunfermline RFC, she later joined Stirling County RFC's Under-15s side. She was subsequently selected for the Scottish Under-18 and Under-20 national teams.

In 2022, she played for the University of Edinburgh in the national final against Hartpury University, her side lost 26–32.

== Rugby career ==
Clarke made her international debut for Scotland in August 2022 against the United States. A month later, she was selected to play in the delayed 2021 Rugby World Cup in New Zealand.

In 2023, she played for the Thistles team in the first edition of the Celtic Challenge. She was later called up for the Scottish side for the Six Nations tournament. She then joined Bristol Bears in the Premiership Women's Rugby competition, where she was part of a small contingent of Scottish players that included Evie Gallagher, Lana Skeldon, and Meryl Smith. She later won the inaugural WXV 2 tournament with the Scottish team in Cape Town.

At the end of the 2023–24 Premiership Women's Rugby season, Bristol Bears reached the Championship final but lost to Gloucester-Hartpury in the end. She got her first start for Scotland in September 2024 against Fiji ahead of the 2024 WXV tournament.

Her younger sister Rhea plays scrum-half for Edinburgh Rugby in the Celtic Challenge competition. They were both selected for the 2025 Rugby World Cup in England and became the first sisters to play in the same tournament for Scotland. Clarke was later ruled out for the remainder of the tournament after she sustained a knee injury in Scotland's match against Fiji.
