= Sadhbh McGrath =

Irish rugby union player (born 2004)

- Born: 30 August 2004 (age 22) Buncrana
- Height: 160 cm (5 ft 3 in)
- Weight: 82 kg (181 lb; 12 st 13 lb)

Rugby union career
- Position: Prop
Senior career
Years	Team	Apps	(Points)
	Cooke RFC		(0)
Provincial / State sides
Years	Team	Apps	(Points)
2022-	Ulster		
2023	Combined Provinces		
2024-	Clovers		
International career
Years	Team	Apps	(Points)
2023–	Ireland	26	(5)
- Correct as of 31 October 2026

Sadhbh McGrath (born 30 August 2004) is an Irish rugby union player. She plays prop for Ulster Rugby and for the Ireland women's national rugby union team.

== Rugby career ==
McGrath played for the Ulster U18s and Ireland U18s teams. She plays for Ulster in the Women's Interprovincial Series.

She was in the Combined Provinces team that competed in the Celtic Challenge competition in 2023. Her performance in the Celtic Challenge earned her a call up into Ireland's squad for the 2023 Women's Six Nations Championship where she made her test debut against Wales in Cardiff.

She represented the Clovers in the 2024–25 Celtic Challenge

McGrath was named in Ireland's side for the 2025 Six Nations Championship in March. On 11 August 2025, she made the Irish squad to the Rugby World Cup.
