= Francesca McGhie =

Scottish international rugby union player

- Born: 7 May 2003 (age 23) Edinburgh, Scotland
- Height: 1.7 m (5 ft 7 in)
- Weight: 73 kg (161 lb; 11 st 7 lb)

Rugby union career
- Position: Fullback / Wing
- Current team: Trailfinders Women
Senior career
Years	Team	Apps	(Points)
2019–2023	Watsonians		
2023	The Thistles		
2023–2025	Leicester Tigers	25	(60)
2025–	Trailfinders		
International career
Years	Team	Apps	(Points)
2023–	Scotland	26	(80)
- Correct as of 26 August 2025

Francesca McGhie (born 7 May 2003, in Edinburgh) is a Scottish rugby union player, who often plays fullback or wing. She plays for Trailfinders Women in Premiership Women's Rugby as well as the Scotland national team.

== Early life ==
McGhie attended Loretto School in Musselburgh. Her early passion was dance, specifically ballet and contemporary, and prior to taking up rugby she trained as a ballerina at the Royal Conservatoire of Scotland in Glasgow. Her brother, Kyle, also plays rugby previously competing for Stirling Wolves and the Scotland under-20 rugby team.

== Rugby career ==
Francesca McGhie started playing rugby at age fifteen playing at East Lothian and Borders Girls Club. In 2019, she joined Watsonians, where she helped win the Scottish Premiership in 2022, she also assisted in lifting the Sarah Beaney Cup a season year later. In 2023, McGhie played in the inaugural edition of the Celtic Challenge for Scottish side The Thistles.

She is a player who can play as a wing, full-back or outside-centre.

=== Professional career ===
Ahead of the 2023–24 season, McGhie signed for Leicester Tigers for their first season in the English Premiership Women's Rugby. She would later describe the move as "one of the best decisions I've ever made". McGhie would score six tries across fifteen appearances in her debut season with the Tigers. She would go on to make a further ten appearances in the 2024–25 season, equlling her try tally from the previous season.

In June 2025, it was announced McGhie would be transferring to rival PWR side Trailfinders based in Ealing, London.

=== Scotland national team ===
Francesca McGhie received her first call-up for Scotland for the 2023 Six Nations, making her debut against England in their opening match hosted at Kingston Park, playing the full 80 minutes on the left wing. She went on to appear in all five matches of the tournament, scoring her first international try against Ireland in a 36–10 victory.

In October 2023, she was called up again to the Scotland team taking part in the inaugural WXV 2 in Cape Town, South Africa. Scotland went on to win the title undefeated, winning their ties against South Africa, USA and Japan, with McGhie starting all three tests and scoring a try against the USA. Following her performances, she was nominated for the World Rugby breakthrough player of the Year Award in the same October.

McGhie was retained in the Scottish squad for the 2024 and 2025 Six Nations, and 2024 WXV 2.

She was later named in the national squad for the 2025 Women's Rugby World Cup in England. In the opening match versus Wales in Salford, McGhie scored a hat-trick of tries and won player of the match.

== Honours ==
=== Club ===
- 2022 Scottish Premiership
- 2023 Sarah Beaney Cup

=== Country ===
- 2023 WXV 2
