= Marie Dupouy =

- Born: 27 July 2002 (age 24)
- Height: 1.61 m (5 ft 3 in)
- Weight: 54 kg (119 lb)

Rugby union career
- Position: Centre
International career
| Years | Team | Apps | (Points) |
| 2021– | France | 1 | (0) |

Marie Dupouy (born 27 July 2002) is a French rugby union player who plays for the France women's national rugby union team as a centre.

== Rugby career ==
Dupouy was called into France's squad as a replacement for their star scrum-half, Laure Sansus, who sustained a knee injury in their pool game against England at the delayed 2021 Rugby World Cup. However, after arriving in New Zealand she was placed in solitary confinement due to a positive COVID test.

Dupouy was named in France's squad for the 2023 Women's Six Nations Championship.
