= Mélissande Llorens =

French international rugby union player

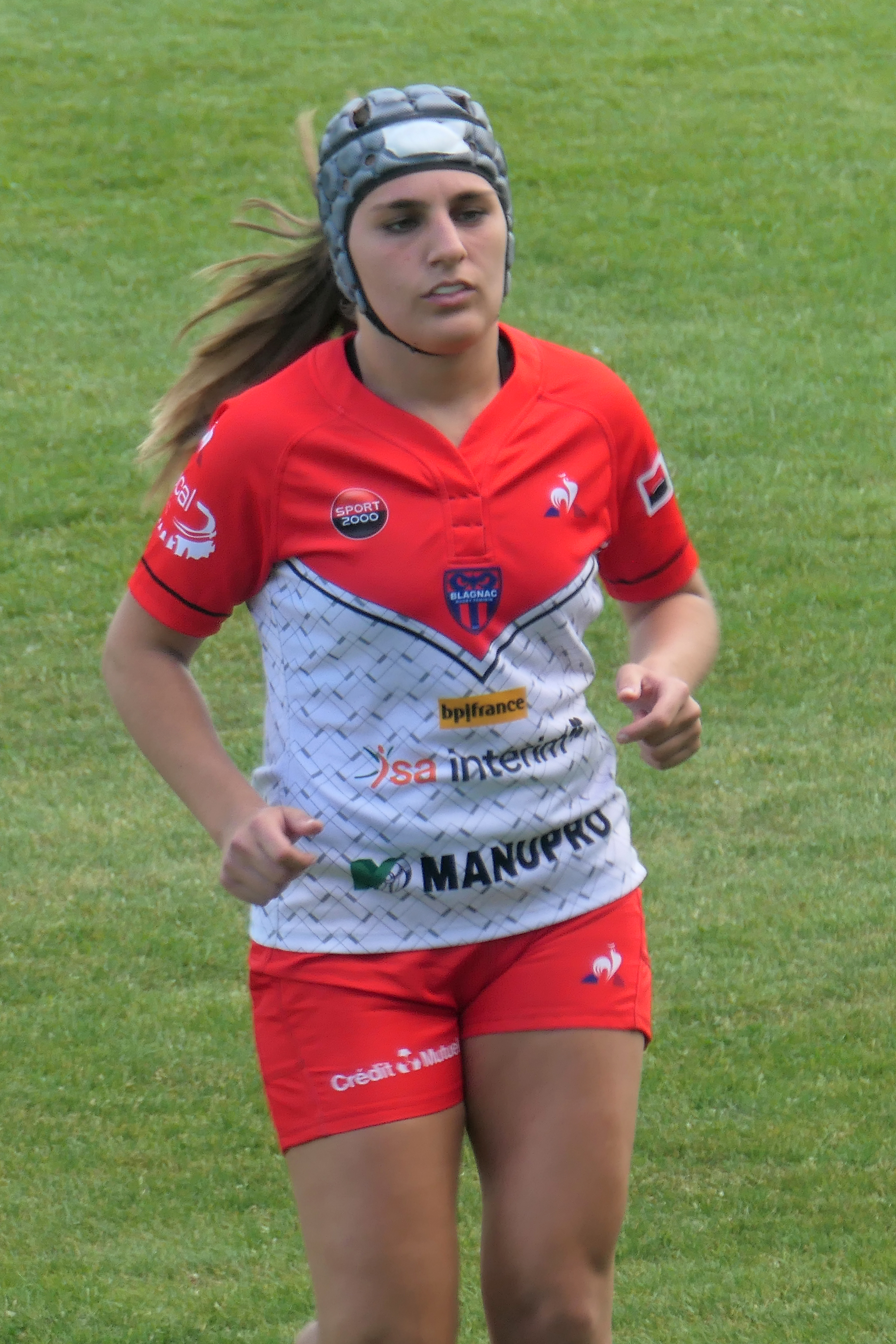
- Llorens in 2022
- Born: 18 June 2002 (age 24)
- Height: 173 cm (5 ft 8 in)

Rugby union career
- Position: Winger
Senior career
Years	Team	Apps	(Points)
	Blagnac SCR		(0)
International career
Years	Team	Apps	(Points)
2021–Present	France	12	(10)

Mélissande Llorens (born 18 June 2002) is a French international rugby union player. She plays as a winger for Blagnac SCR as well as in the France women's national rugby union team. She competed at the 2021 Rugby World Cup, and the 2022 Women's Six Nations Championship.

== Career ==
Llorens began rugby at the age of 12 at Tyrosse, then joined the Toulouse women's rugby hope center in 2017. She joined Blagnac SCR in 2018. At the same time, she pursued nursing studies at the University Hospital of Toulouse.

Llorens made her test debut for France on 6 November 2021, against South Africa which her side won 46 to 3. She entered in the 68th minute and scored a try four minutes later, which would be called "try of the year 2021” by the French Rugby Federation.

Llorens was named in France's squad for the 2023 Women's Six Nations Championship. During that championship, she was awarded Player of the Match after a sensational performance in Les Bleues’ 55-0 win over Scotland.

On 7 March 2025, she was named in the side for the Women's Six Nations Championship.
