= Molly Scuffil-McCabe =

Irish rugby union player (born 1998)

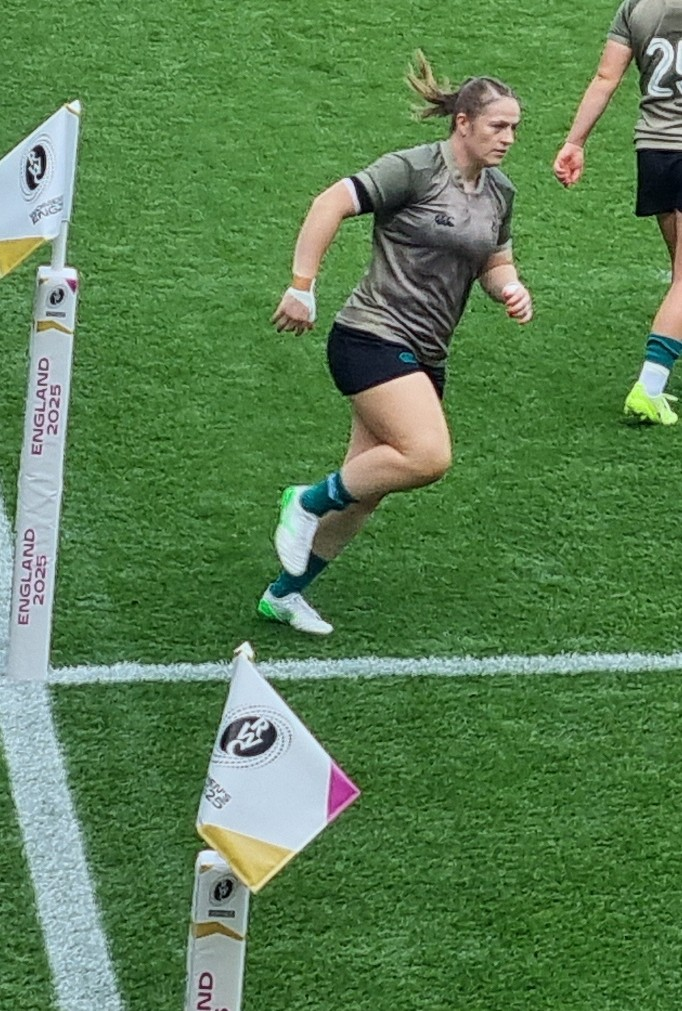
- 2025 World Cup in Northampton
- Born: 15 March 1998 (age 28) Dublin
- Height: 163 cm (5 ft 4 in)
- Weight: 65 kg (143 lb; 10 st 3 lb)

Rugby union career
- Position: Scrumhalf
Provincial / State sides
Years	Team	Apps	(Points)
2024	Manawatū Cyclones	3	(20)
International career
Years	Team	Apps	(Points)
2022–	Ireland	23	(10)
- Correct as of 24 September 2025

Molly Scuffil-McCabe (born 15 March 1998 Dublin) is an Irish rugby union player. She plays for Railway Union RFC, and the Ireland women's national rugby union team.

== Early career ==
Scuffil-McCabe was encouraged by former Irish international, Fiona Coghlan, who was her maths and PE teacher at Lucan Community College to give rugby ago. She competed for Ireland's U18 7s team in 2014 and 2015.

== Rugby career ==
Scuffil-McCabe has played for Westmanstown RFC, St Mary's College and Railway Union RFC. She made her international debut for Ireland against England at the 2022 Women's Six Nations Championship.

She was one of several Irish 15s and sevens female players who got full-time professional contracts in 2023. She later featured for Ireland in the Six Nations competition. She also made the Irish squad that competed in the inaugural WXV 3 tournament in Dubai in October.

In 2024, she joined the Manawatū Cyclones in the Farah Palmer Cup competition while she was doing veterinary studies at Massey University in New Zealand.

She was named in Ireland's side for the 2025 Six Nations Championship in March. She was selected in the Irish squad for the 2025 Rugby World Cup in England.
