= Delaney Burns =

English rugby union player (born 2001)

- Born: 29 November 2001 (age 24)
- Height: 1.73 m (5 ft 8 in)

Rugby union career
- Position: Lock
Senior career
Years	Team	Apps	(Points)
2018–Present	Bristol Bears		(0)
International career
Years	Team	Apps	(Points)
2023	England	3	(0)

Delaney Burns (born 29 November 2001) is an English rugby union player. She plays for Bristol Bears Women, and the England women's national rugby union team.

== Career ==
Burns competed at the 2023 Women's Six Nations Championship. She played for Dorchester Girls, and Bristol Bears Women.
