= Deirbhile Nic a Bháird =

Irish rugby union player

- Born: 22 September 1995 (age 31) Cork
- Height: 163 cm (5 ft 4 in)
- Weight: 70 kg (154 lb; 11 st 0 lb)

Rugby union career
- Position: Hooker
- Current team: Munster / Clovers
International career
Years	Team	Apps	(Points)
2019–	Ireland	11	(0)
National sevens team
Years	Team		Comps
2017–	Ireland		

Deirbhile Nic a Bháird (born 22 September 1995) is an Irish rugby union player. She plays for the Ireland women's national rugby union team.

== Early career ==
Nic a Bháird played alongside the boys with Highfield RFC up to under 14 level. She played for Old Belvedere RFC.

== Rugby career ==
Nic a Bháird spent some time in Ireland's training squad in the lead up to the 2017 Women's Rugby World Cup at home. She competed for Ireland's sevens side during the 2018–19 World Series. She eventually made her fifteens test debut for Ireland in their 22–5 win against Scotland at the 2019 Women's Six Nations Championship.

She took a four-year break from all forms of rugby before returning to the game in 2023. She competed at the 2023 Six Nations where Ireland had a winless campaign and received their first wooden spoon since 2004. She got an ACL tear in April 2024 and was out for most of the season before rejoining the Irish squad for their September test against Australia before the WXV 1 tournament.

Nic a Bháird was named in Ireland's side for the 2025 Six Nations Championship in March.
