= Maëlle Picut =

French rugby union player

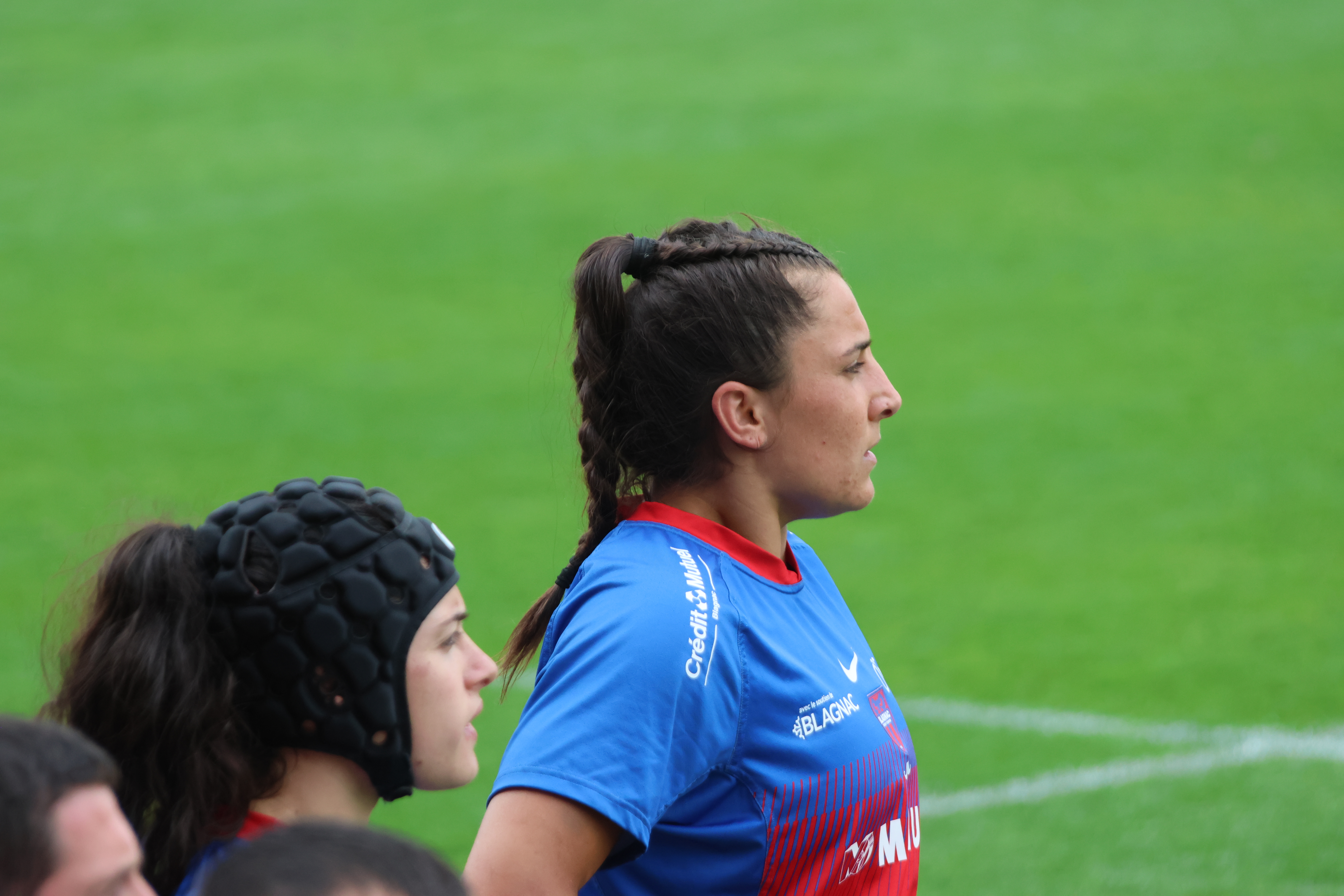
- Born: 23 November 1999 (age 26) Perpignan, France
- Height: 170 cm (5 ft 7 in)

Rugby union career
- Position: Flanker
International career
Years	Team	Apps	(Points)
2023	France	4	(0)

Maëlle Picut (born 23 November 1999) is a French rugby union player. Picut represents the France national team, and has earned 4 caps.

== Career ==
Picut competed at the 2023 Women's Six Nations Championship. She has played club rugby for Renaissance College, Durham University Women's Rugby Club, and Darlington Mowden Park Sharks.
