= Méabh Deely =

Irish rugby union player

- Born: 25 October 2000 (age 26) Ballinasloe, Ireland
- Height: 165 cm (5 ft 5 in)

Rugby union career
- Position: Fullback
Senior career
Years	Team	Apps	(Points)
	Blackrock College RFC		(0)
International career
Years	Team	Apps	(Points)
2022–	Ireland	14	(24)

Méabh Deely (born 25 October 2000) is an Irish international rugby union player from Galway. She plays at full-back for Blackrock College, the Connacht Women's team, and the Ireland women's national rugby union team.

She was included in the Ireland squad for the 2025 Women's Rugby World Cup.
