= Anne Young (rugby union) =

- Born: 17 March 2000 (age 26) Stevenage, England
- Height: 168 cm (5 ft 6 in)
- Weight: 86 kg (190 lb; 13 st 8 lb)

Rugby union career
- Position: Prop
Senior career
Years	Team	Apps	(Points)
2022–2024	Sale Sharks	28	
2024–	Loughborough Lightning	5	
International career
Years	Team	Apps	(Points)
2021–	Scotland	23	(5)

Anne Young (born 17 March 2000) is a Scottish rugby union player. She competed for Scotland at the 2021 and 2025 Women's Rugby World Cups.

== Career ==
Young was born in Stevenage, England to Scottish parents, she started playing rugby at the age of ten at Helensburgh Rugby School with her twin sister Eleanor.

As a secondary school student, she joined Hillhead Jordanhill RFC. She traveled by train to Glasgow for training after school. She only played twice for the senior team before being selected to play in the 2018 Scottish Championship final where her side had a 68–12 victory against the Watsonians.

She went to study social and cultural anthropology at the University of Edinburgh, a choice motivated by the fact that her mother worked there, and by the quality of the women's rugby program. She fractured her collarbone in her first match and did not play again for the rest of the season.

In the summer of 2019, Young was called up for a training camp with the senior Scotland team and was later selected for the tour to South Africa. However, she made her international debut for Scotland in November 2021 against Japan. She earned her second cap during the 2022 Six Nations Tournament, against Wales.

In September 2022, Young was selected to play in the delayed 2021 Rugby World Cup in New Zealand. After the tournament, she signed a contract with the Scottish Rugby Union and then joined Sale Sharks in England.

In 2023, she was again selected for the Six Nations championship. Later that year, she won the inaugural WXV 2 competition with Scotland. She was called up to the squad for the 2024 Six Nations but did not play any matches.

At the end of the 2023–2024 season she signed with Loughborough Lightning. She was selected for the 2024 WXV 2 tournament, where she scored a try against Australia.

Young was named in the Scottish side for the 2025 Women's Rugby World Cup in England.
