= Ailsa Hughes =

Irish rugby player (born 1991)

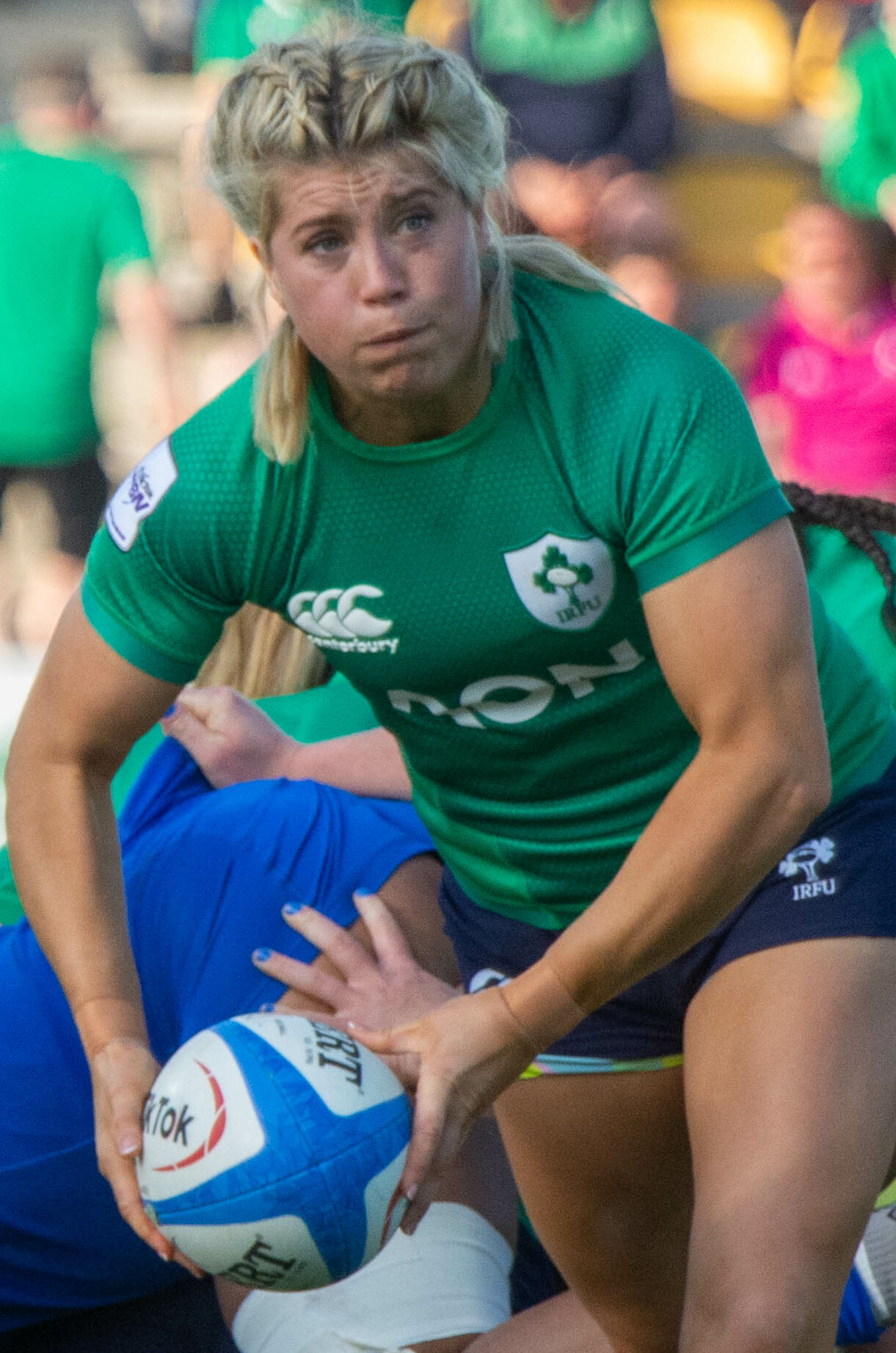
- Born: 18 August 1991 (age 35) Tullamore Ireland
- Height: 1.55 m (5 ft 1 in)
- Weight: 63 kg (139 lb; 9 st 13 lb)

Rugby union career
- Position: Scrum-half
Amateur team(s)
Years	Team	Apps	(Points)
- Tullamore RFC
Senior career
Years	Team	Apps	(Points)
- Railway Union
- Leinster
International career
Years	Team	Apps	(Points)
2017–present	Ireland	12	(0)
National sevens team
Years	Team		Comps
	Ireland 7s		0

Ailsa Hughes (born 18 August 1991) is an Irish rugby player from Tullamore. She plays, at scrum-half, for Railway Union and the Ireland women's national rugby union team.

== Club career ==
Hughes won All-Ireland medals at camogie but wanted to play rugby so much that she helped set up the women's team in Tullamore RFC. Their women's team saw rapid growth, starting in 2013 and reaching All-Ireland League status within four years.

To further her career she moved to All-Ireland League club Railway Union in 2014.

== International career ==
Hughes made her debut for Ireland, starting against Scotland, in the 2017 Women's Six Nations. She also started against Italy that season but did not make the Ireland squad for the 2017 Women's Rugby World Cup that was held in Dublin.

She was Ireland's starting scrum-half in their first four 2018 Women's Six Nations game and came off the bench, to replace Nicole Cronin, in the final round against England.

She played twice in the 2019 Women's Six Nations, starting against England and Scotland. Her only appearance in the 2020 Women's Six Nations was as a replacement against Italy.

== Personal life ==
Hughes won All-Ireland Minor B (2008) and All-Ireland Intermediate medals with Offaly (2010) in camogie before concentrating on rugby. She has worked as a community development officer and coach for Leinster Rugby and is now a development officer for the Offaly Sports Partnership.
