= Charlotte Escudero =

France international rugby union player

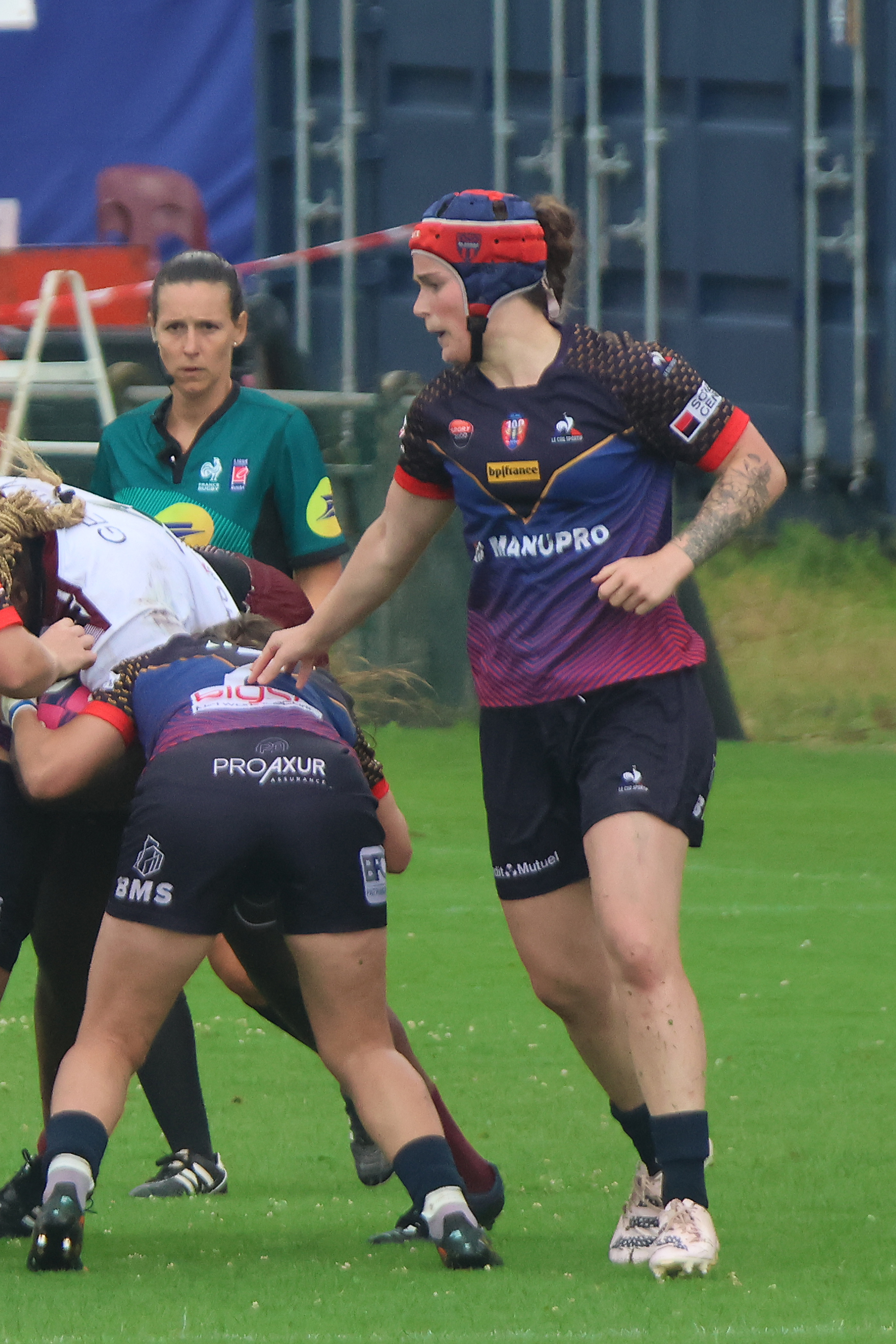
- Born: 26 December 2000 (age 25)
- Height: 178 cm (5 ft 10 in)

Rugby union career
- Position: Number 8
Senior career
Years	Team	Apps	(Points)
2023–	Stade Toulousain		(0)
International career
Years	Team	Apps	(Points)
2022–	France	32	(35)

Charlotte Escudero (born 26 December 2000) is a French rugby union player who plays for Stade Toulousain and the France women's national rugby union team. She competed at the delayed 2021 Rugby World Cup.

== Career ==
Escudero who joined Blagnac at the age of 18, had been called up to the French squad ahead of the 2022 Women's Six Nations Championship but had to pull out with injury, however she remained in the French coaches thoughts and was called up again on her return. She made her France debut in September 2022 against Italy. She was named in France's team for the delayed 2021 Rugby World Cup in New Zealand. She started the World Cup quarter-final against Italy that France won to clinch a semi final berth.

She played in the 2025 Women's Six Nations Championship, having been named in the national side on 7 March. In August, she was selected in the French side to the Women's Rugby World Cup in England.

== Honours ==
Club

- French Elite 1 Championship runner-up: 2021 (Blagnac Rugby).
- French Elite 1 Championship runner-up: 2022 (Blagnac Rugby).
- French Elite 1 Championship runner-up: 2023 (Blagnac Rugby).
- French Women's Cup winner: 2024 (Stade Toulousain).

International

- Silver medalist at the 2018 Summer Youth Olympics (rugby sevens).
- Silver medalist at the 2019 Summer Universiade (rugby sevens).
- Third place at the 2021 Rugby World Cup (played in 2022) with France.
