= Ioan Cunningham =

Welsh rugby union player and coach

- Born: 1 January 1983 (age 43)
- Height: 1.86 m (6 ft 1 in)
- Weight: 109 kg (240 lb)

Rugby union career
- Position: Number eight
- Current team: Bridgend Ravens
Amateur team(s)
Years	Team	Apps	(Points)
2003-2007	Llanelli RFC		
2007-2008	Bridgend Ravens		
2008-2009	Llandovery RFC		
2009-2010	Carmarthen Quins RFC		
Senior career
Years	Team	Apps	(Points)
2010–	Bridgend Ravens		
Coaching career
- Years: Team
- 2012–2015: Wales U20
- 2021–2024: Wales Women
- 2025–: Fiji Women

Ioan Cunningham (born 1 January 1983) is a Welsh rugby union coach. He was head coach of the Wales women's national rugby union team from 2021 to 2024. He was removed after being accused of bullying players to sign contracts. and now coaches Fiji women's national rugby union team.

== Career ==
Cunningham played for Wales under-16, captained the under-18's and under-19's, and also featured for the under-21's teams.

Cunningham played at number 8 and was captain of the Bridgend Ravens. He has also played for Llanelli RFC, Bridgend RFC, Llandovery RFC, and Carmarthen Quins RFC.

=== Coaching career ===
Cunningham was previously the Head Coach of Wales national under-20 team. He was the Scarlets forwards coach from 2015 to 2020. November 2024 saw the end of his position as head coach of the Welsh National side. In February 2025, he became head coach of Fiji women's national rugby union team.
