= Gabrielle Vernier =

France international rugby union player

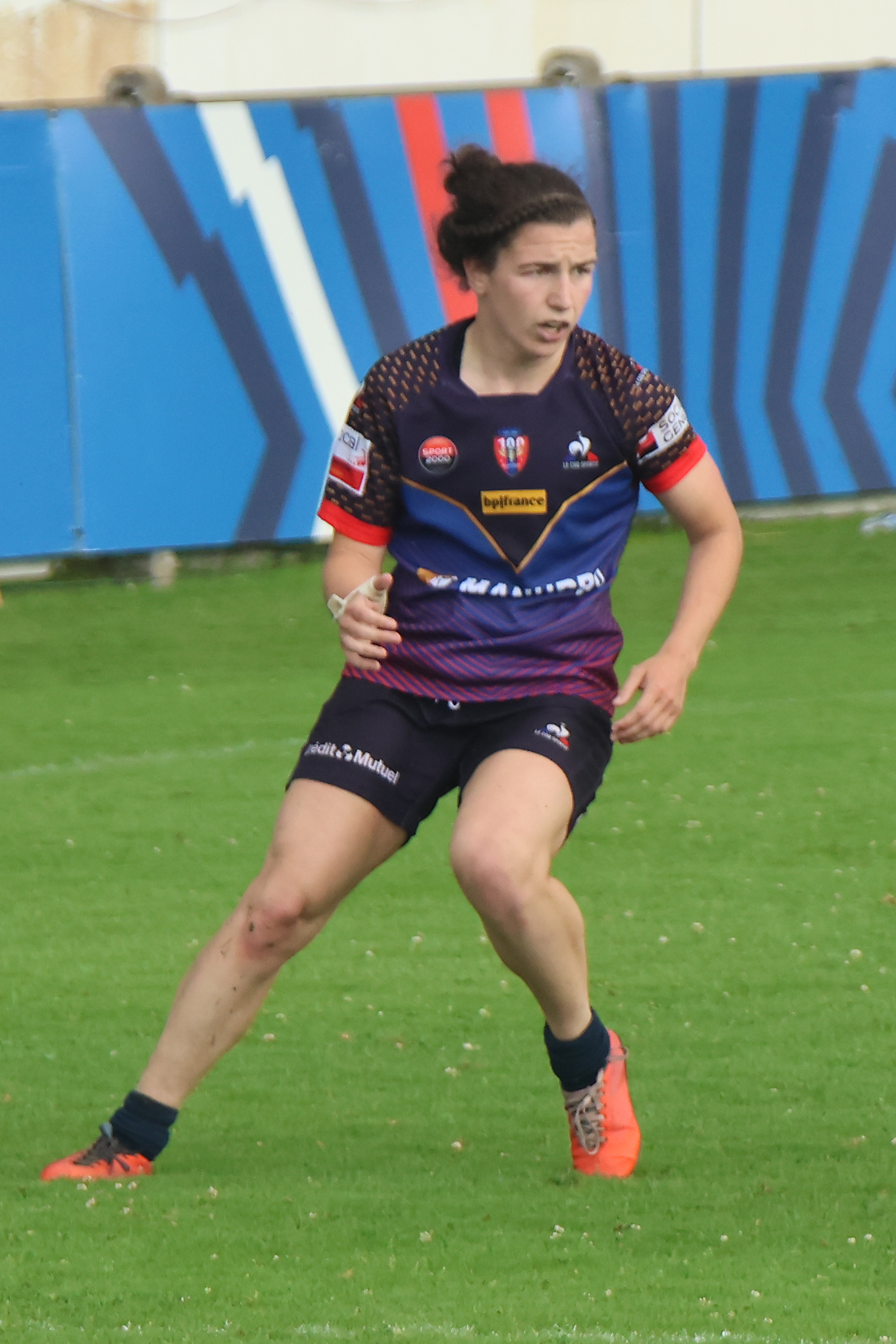
- Born: Gabrielle Vernier; 12 June 1997 (age 29) Suresnes, France
- Height: 1.65 m (5 ft 5 in)

Rugby union career
- Position: Centre
Senior career
Years	Team	Apps	(Points)
2019–2026	Blagnac SCR		(0)
2026–	Gloucester-Hartpury	0	(0)
International career
Years	Team	Apps	(Points)
2017–	France	60	(80)

Gabrielle Vernier (born 12 June 1997) is a French rugby union player who plays for Blagnac SCR and the France women's national rugby union team as a centre. She competed at the delayed 2021 Rugby World Cup and the 2025 Women's Rugby World Cup. She will join Gloucester-Hartpury Women in Premiership Women's Rugby ahead of the 2026–27 season.

== Early life ==
Vernier started playing aged 10 for Rueil Athletic Club before playing for Racing Club Nanterre. She then moved north to Lille to continue her studies.

== Career ==
Vernier won the French championships with Lille MRCV in 2016. She made her French debut on 11 November 2017 against Spain. In 2021 she was voted Women's Six Nations Player of Round 1. She was named in France's team for the delayed (due to the COVID-19 pandemic) 2021 Rugby World Cup in New Zealand. She started their opening game, a 40–5 victory over South Africa and played throughout the tournament, scoring a try in the French semi-final defeat to hosts and eventual champions New Zealand.

In May 2023 she was awarded the best player award for the 2023 Six Nations after a tournament in which she played every minute and scored five tries. In November 2023 she was nominated for the World Rugby Women's 15s Player of the Year.

She was named in France's side for the 2025 Women's Six Nations Championship on 7 March. On 2 August, she was selected in the French side to the 2025 Women's Rugby World Cup. In April 2026, she won her sixtieth cap for France as they played Wales in the 2026 Women's Six Nations Championship, but a shoulder injury which forced her off in the 48th minute of France's 38–7 victory in the game ruled her out for the rest of the tournament.

In June 2026, it was announced that Vernier would leave Blagnac SCR after seven seasons to sign for English club Gloucester-Hartpury ahead of the 2026-27 Premiership Women's Rugby season. Vernier remained eligible for the national team despite relinquishing her domestic federal contract to play in England.
