= Aoife Doyle =

Irish rugby union player

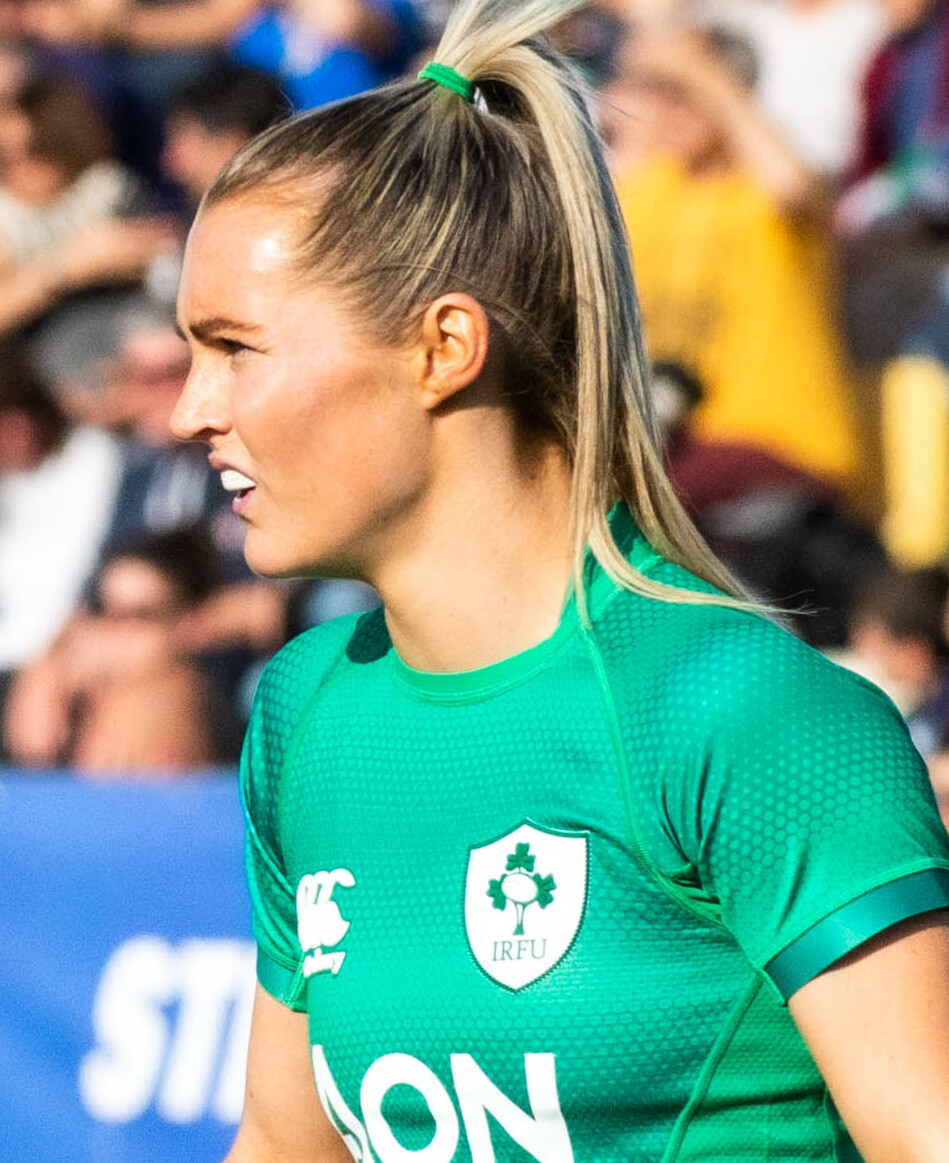
- Doyle with Ireland in 2023
- Born: 2 June 1995 (age 31) Limerick, Ireland
- Height: 1.70 m (5 ft 7 in)
- Weight: 64 kg (141 lb; 10 st 1 lb)

Rugby union career
- Position: Wing
Amateur team(s)
Years	Team	Apps	(Points)
- Shannon RFC
Senior career
Years	Team	Apps	(Points)
2017	Railway Union		
2016	Munster		
International career
Years	Team	Apps	(Points)
2014-2015	Ireland	17	(0)
National sevens team
Years	Team		Comps
2016-2020	Ireland 7s		

Aoife Doyle (born 2 June 1995) is an Irish rugby player from Limerick. She plays for Railway Union, Munster and the Ireland women's national rugby union team. She is a teacher in Dublin.

== Club career ==
Doyle's first club was Shannon RFC in Limerick and she continued to play for them initially when she joined All-Ireland League side Railway Union until she concentrated exclusively on sevens rugby for six years.

== International career ==
Doyle was selected for the Ireland women's national rugby union team that won the 2015 Women's Six Nations when she was 18 years of age. She debuted as a starter, on the wing, against France in Ashbourne and was a replacement versus Wales and Scotland.

She then concentrated solely on playing for the Ireland women's national rugby sevens team for six years, making her debut in the World Rugby Sevens Series in Clermont-Ferrand in 2016.

She was part of the team that was sixth at the 2018 Sevens World Cup in San Francisco and the team that finished fourth in Sydney in February 2019, Ireland's best ever result on the World Seven Series tour.

After they failed to qualify for the Tokyo Olympics she retired from international sevens rugby and was recalled to the national XVs team by head coach Adam Griggs.

In the 2020 Women's Six Nations Doyle started against Scotland and England and was a replacement against Wales.

== Personal life ==
Doyle, from Clareview in Limerick City, went to school at Laurel Hill Secondary School. Her father was a primary school teacher and lecturer and her mother was a local government official. She started studying in St Patrick's Drumcondra after school but quit college due to the difficulty of mixing full-time study with playing on the International Sevens circuit.

In 2020 she quit her secretarial job in a drug treatment centre to return to college, to study teaching at the Marino Institute of Education.

== Honours ==
- 2015 Six Nations winner with Ireland
