= Sara Tounesi =

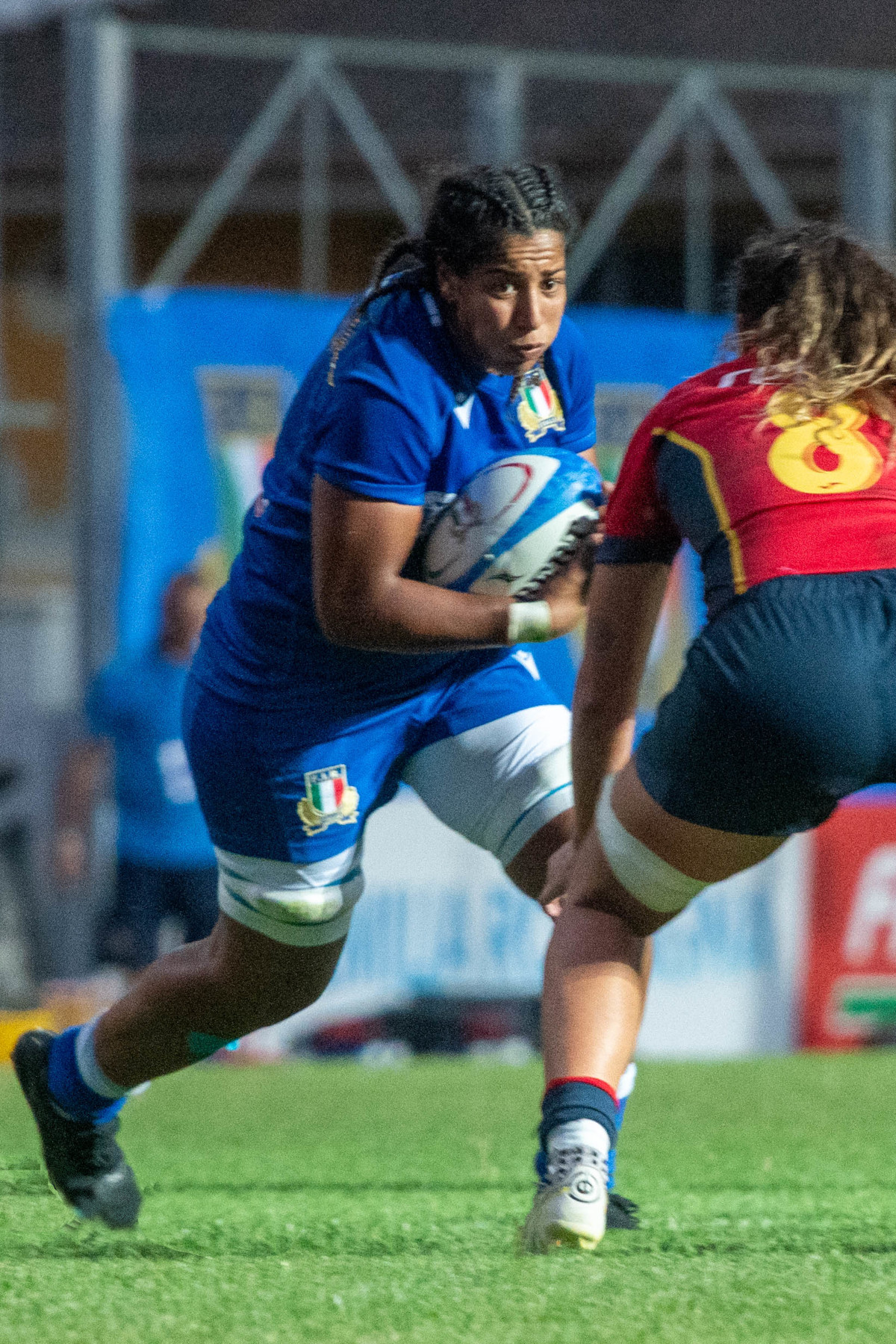
- Tounesi in the 2023 WXV match against Spain.
- Born: 19 July 1995 (age 31)
- Height: 180 cm (5 ft 11 in)
- Weight: 80 kg (176 lb; 12 st 8 lb)

Rugby union career
- Position: Lock
Senior career
| Years | Team | Apps | (Points) |
| 2014–2015 | Cremona | | (0) |
| 2015–2020 | Colorno | | (0) |
| 2020–2022 | ASM Romagnat | | (0) |
| 2022–? | Sale Sharks | | (0) |
| | Montpellier | | (0) |
International career
| Years | Team | Apps | (Points) |
| 2017– | Italy | 52 | (15) |

Sara Tounesi (born 19 July 1995) is an Italian rugby union player.

== Rugby career ==
Tounesi was born in Cremona, Italy to Moroccan parents, she began playing rugby sevens at the age of 19 for her local club. She started playing rugby fifteens after joining Colorno in 2015 and made her debut in the women's Serie A competition.

In 2016 she was called up to the senior Italian women's team that participated in the Six Nations, although she did not get game time. The following year she reached the championship final with Colorno, but were defeated by Valsugana.

She was subsequently named in Italy's squad for the 2017 Women's Rugby World Cup in Ireland. She made her international debut for Italy during their first match of the group stage against the United States. She also featured against England and Spain from off the bench.

In 2018, she won the Serie A championship with Colorno. In 2020, she moved to France to play for ASM Romagnat in the Élite 1 competition, they became national champions in her debut season. After two seasons playing for Romagnat she signed with English club, Sale Sharks, in 2022.

Tounesi was cited for biting an opponent following Italy's match against Japan in the group stage of the 2021 Rugby World Cup, she was handed a 12-week ban for the offence and was ruled out for the remainder of the tournament.

She was a stand out player during Italy's campaign in the 2023 Six Nations tournament. She played both at Lock and Blindside flanker in the Championship, 19.7% of her 73 tackles were dominant, she made five turnovers, with only four players making more. She also won four lineouts and stole one, and ran 161 metres from 36 carries, but also scored two tries against England and Scotland.

She made Italy's 34-player squad for the Women's Six Nations Championship on 5 March 2025. On 11 August, she was named in the Italian squad to the Women's Rugby World Cup in England.
