= Emily Robinson (rugby union, born 2000) =

English rugby union player

- Born: 22 June 2000 (age 26) Brighton and Hove, England
- Height: 1.72 m (5 ft 8 in)
- Weight: 75 kg (165 lb)
- Notable relative: Flo Robinson (sister)

Rugby union career
- Position: Flanker
- Current team: Harlequins Women
Senior career
Years	Team	Apps	(Points)
2018–	Harlequins		
International career
Years	Team	Apps	(Points)
2023–	England	1	(0)

Emily Robinson (born 22 June 2000) is an English rugby union player. She plays for Harlequins Women domestically and is a member of England's 2021 Women's Six Nations Championship squad as one of six development players.

== International career ==
In September 2020 Robinson was invited to train with the England squad. In 2021 she was called up to the country's Women's Six Nations squad as a development player. Her sister, Flo Robinson, was also named to the squad.

== Club career ==
Robinson plays for Harlequins Women at club level. She started out playing for the development side before graduating to the Premier 15s side in 2019.

== Early life and education ==
She began playing rugby at Hove Rugby Club aged six. She was the only girl in the team at the time. Her sister, Flo Robinson, plays for Exeter Chiefs and was also named to the England squad for the 2021 Women's Six Nations.

Away from sport, Robinson is a professional carpenter.

At school, Robinson excelled at throwing: in 2018 she captained the Sussex Schools team for the English Schools Championships and won the bronze medal in the Senior Girls Discus.
