= Caity Mattinson =

Scotland international rugby union player

- Born: 17 May 1996 (age 30) Inverness, Scotland
- Height: 162 cm (5 ft 4 in)
- Weight: 63 kg (139 lb)

Rugby union career
- Position: Scrum half
Senior career
Years	Team	Apps	(Points)
–2023	Worcester Warriors		
2023–	Gloucester-Hartpury		
2024	Edinburgh Rugby Women	1	(5)
International career
Years	Team	Apps	(Points)
2017–18	England	7	(0)
2022–2025	Scotland	43	(0)

Caity Mattinson (born 17 May 1996) is a Scottish retired rugby union player who played as a scrum half. After initially playing England she went on to represent Scotland at two Women’s Rugby World Cups and two WXV 2 tournaments, and in Rugby Sevens at the 2022 Commonwealth Games. She retired after playing at the 2025 World Cup.

== Early life ==
Mattinson was born in Inverness, Scotland but was brought up in Northumberland in England from the age of three-years-old.

== Club career ==
She played her club rugby for Worcester Warriors prior to joining Gloucester-Hartpury in November 2023.

== International career ==
=== England International ===
After developing through the rugby system in England she made her international debut for England in 2017.

=== Scotland International ===
Following a change in the international regulations Mattinson was able to make her debut for Scotland in February 2022. Mattinson was selected to play for Scotland at the 2022 Commonwealth Games in rugby sevens. She was also selected for the COVID-delayed 2021 Rugby World Cup held in October 2022. In December 2022 she was awarded a professional contract by Scottish Rugby.

She was named in Scotland's squad for the 2025 Six Nations Championship in March. She was also selected in the Scottish side for the 2025 Rugby World Cup in England. Following the conclusion of the World Cup, she retired from rugby, having won 37 caps for Scotland.

== Post-playing career ==
Following her retirement from rugby in 2025, Mattinson coached in Coventry Rugby's academy and worked as schools rugby manager at Banbury RFC as well as working with Scotland U21. In October 2026, Mattinson joined Scottish Rugby in a full-time role as a pathways skills coach.
