= Alex Callender =

Wales international rugby union player (born 2000)

- Born: 29 July 2000 (age 26) Carmarthen, Wales
- Height: 1.65 m (5 ft 5 in)
- Weight: 75.6 kg (167 lb)

Rugby union career
- Position: Back row
- Current team: Harlequins
Senior career
Years	Team	Apps	(Points)
2018–2023	Worcester Warriors	51	(40)
2023–2024	Brython Thunder	7	(15)
2024–	Harlequins		
- Correct as of 6 July 2024
International career
Years	Team	Apps	(Points)
2019–	Wales	47	(45)
- Correct as of 24 September 2025

Alex Callender (born 29 July 2000) is a Welsh rugby union player who plays back row for the Harlequins Premiership Women's Rugby and the Wales women's national rugby union team. She won her first international cap against France in the 2019 Women's Six Nations Championship.

== Playing career ==
Callender initially played netball, competing at county level and representing Wales at under-21 level. Her first rugby training sessions took place in 2017, and after a short period of playing both sports Callender opted to drop netball to focus her efforts on rugby. After a successful tryout for the Scarlets under-18 side, Callender went on to play for the senior Scarlets Ladies team in the WRU Women's Regional Championship, including as captain in 2019.

In December 2018, Callender left the Scarlets to join English Premier 15s side Worcester Valkyries. She remained with the club until its collapse in October 2023.

Callender was part of the Wales 7s squad for the Paris Sevens tournament, which was the first appearance for a Wales Women's 7s team at a World Rugby Sevens Series event. Callender was made captain of the Wales 7s squad for the 2021 Rugby Europe Sevens Championship Series.

Callender was included in the Wales senior squad for the 2018 Autumn Internationals series of games, but ultimately did not make an appearance during the series. Her debut for Wales came in 2019 against France in the 2019 Women's Six Nations Championship. In July 2022, after having made 18 appearances for Wales as an amateur player, Callender was awarded a full-time contract until the end of that year's Rugby World Cup. She made four appearances during the World Cup, and was voted players’ player of the tournament by her squad teammates. Her contract with the WRU was renewed for the whole of 2023.

After the collapse of Worcester Warriors Women in October 2023, Callender joined up with the newly formed Brython Thunder team to play in the 2024 Celtic Challenge tournament, captaining the side.

She joined Harlequins at the end of the 2024 season. She was named in the Welsh side for the 2025 Six Nations Championship in March.

On 11 August 2025, she was selected in the Welsh squad for 2025 Women's Rugby World Cup.
