= Meryl Smith =

Scotland international rugby union player

- Born: 11 June 2001 (age 25) Edinburgh, Scotland

Rugby union career
- Position: Centre
International career
Years	Team	Apps	(Points)
2019 -	Scotland	13	(18)

Meryl Smith (born 11 June 2001) is a Scottish rugby union player who plays as a centre.

== Early life ==
Smith started playing rugby with the Murrayfield Wanderers Girls team aged 13. She became a student at Edinburgh University studying biomedical science from September 2019. She was capped by Scotland U18 and U20 in Touch Rugby.

== Career ==
In 2019 Smith was called up by the Scotland senior team for the first time to compete at the World Rugby Women’s Sevens Series event in Biarritz. Smith was selected to play for Scotland at the 2022 Commonwealth Games in rugby sevens. She was also selected for the COVID-delayed 2021 Rugby World Cup held in October 2022. In December 2022 she was awarded a professional contract by Scottish Rugby.
