= 2023 Celtic Challenge =

Women's rugby union competition in Europe

- Countries: Ireland; Wales; Scotland
- Number of teams: 6
- Champions: (Ireland) Combined Provinces XV (1st title)
- Runners-up: (Scotland) The Thistles
- Matches played: 6

Official website
- celticrugbycomp.com

The 2023 Celtic Challenge was the inaugural season of the Celtic Challenge, a cross-border women's rugby union competition with teams from Ireland, Wales, and Scotland. The competition consisted of three representative teams, one representing each nation. This was the only season following this format, with six new teams taking the field for the 2023-24 season.

== Teams and locations ==
This first edition consisted of six matches in a double round-robin:

Union	Ireland	Scotland	Wales
Team	Combined Provinces XV	The Thistles	Wales Development XV

Matches

Matchday	Home team	Score	Away team	Venue	Date	Ref
1	(Scotland) The Thistles	27–29	Wales Development XV	Scotstoun Stadium	22 January 2023	
2	Wales Development XV	26–27	(Ireland) Combined Provinces XV	Cardiff Arms Park	29 January 2023	
3	(Ireland) Combined Provinces XV	45–12	(Scotland) The Thistles	Kingspan Stadium	4 February 2023	
4	Wales Development XV	7–21	(Scotland) The Thistles	Cardiff Arms Park	11 February 2023	
5	(Ireland) Combined Provinces XV	19–0	Wales Development XV	Kingspan Stadium	18 February 2023	
6	(Scotland) The Thistles	26–33	(Ireland) Combined Provinces XV	DAM Health Stadium	25 February 2023	

Final table

Pos	Team	Pld	W	D	L	PF	PA	PD	T	TB	LB	Pts
1	(Ireland) Combined Provinces XV (C)	4	4	0	0	124	64	+60	18	3	0	19
2	(Scotland) The Thistles	4	1	0	3	86	114	−28	14	1	2	7
3	Wales Development XV	4	1	0	3	62	94	−32	9	0	1	5

Rules for classification: 1) competition points; 2) match points difference; 3) match points for
(C) Champion
