= 2020 Women's Six Nations Championship =

Women's rugby union competition

- Date: 2 February – 6 December 2020
- Countries: England; France; Ireland; Italy; Scotland; Wales

Tournament statistics
- Champions: England (16th title)
- Grand Slam: England (15th title)
- Triple Crown: England (21st title)
- Matches played: 12
- Tries scored: 73 (6.08 per match)
- Top point scorer: (England) Emily Scarratt (55)
- Top try scorers: (France) Cyrielle Banet (4) (France) Laure Sansus (4) (England) Abigail Dow (4) (England) Poppy Cleall (4)
- Player of the tournament: (England) Emily Scarratt
- Official website: Official website

The 2020 Women's Six Nations Championship was the 19th series of the Women's Six Nations Championship, an annual women's rugby union competition contested by six European rugby union national teams. Matches were originally scheduled for February and March 2020, on the same weekends as the men's tournament, if not always the same day.

Seven matches in the tournament were postponed due to health and safety reasons. The match between Scotland and England was originally scheduled for Sunday 9 February but was postponed to the following day with no public admission due to Storm Ciara. The game between Ireland and Wales was played as planned on 9 February. Italy's matches with Scotland, Ireland and England, scheduled for 23 February, 8 March and 15 March respectively, were all postponed due to the COVID-19 pandemic in Italy. Scotland's game against France was also postponed due to an undisclosed player testing positive of the virus and seven other players and management self-isolating. On 10 November, it was announced that the remaining three fixtures would be cancelled.

== Table ==
Position	Nation	Matches				Points			Tries		Bonus points			Table points
Position	Nation	Played	Won	Drawn	Lost	For	Against	Diff	For	Against	T BP	L BP	GS BP	Table points
1	England	5	5	0	0	219	20	+199	34	2	4	0	3	27
2	France	4	2	1	1	121	42	+79	17	5	2	1	0	13
3	Ireland	4	3	0	1	70	60	+10	11	10	1	0	0	13
4	Italy	4	1	0	3	36	135	–99	5	19	0	0	0	4
4	Scotland	3	0	1	2	27	84	–57	3	13	0	1	0	3
6	Wales	4	0	0	4	34	166	–132	5	26	0	1	0	1

== Fixtures ==
=== Week 1 ===
Test: 1381	2 February 2020	(1 BP) France	13–19	England	Stade du Hameau, Pau
	13:30 CET (UTC+01:00)	Try: Sansus 24' c Con: Trémoulière (1/1) 25'; Pen: Trémoulière (2/2) 36', 75'	Report	Try: Dow 9' m Fleetwood 18' c Scarratt 62' c Con: Scarratt (2/3) 20', 63'	Referee: Aimee Barrett-Theron (South Africa)

Team details

FB	15	Jessy Trémoulière
RW	14	Caroline Boujard
OC	13	Camille Boudard
IC	12	Gabrielle Vernier	5' to 17'		(substituted off) 35'
LW	11	Cyrielle Banet	(substituted off) 51'
FH	10	Pauline Bourdon
SH	9	Laure Sansus	(substituted off) 65'
N8	8	Romane Ménager
OF	7	Gaëlle Hermet (c)
BF	6	Céline Ferer	(substituted off) 47'
RL	5	Madoussou Fall	(substituted off) 47'
LL	4	Audrey Forlani
TP	3	Annaëlle Deshayes	(substituted off) 62'
HK	2	Agathe Sochat	(substituted off) 59'
LP	1	Lise Arricastre	(substituted off) 51'
Replacements:
HK	16	Caroline Thomas	(substituted on) 59'
PR	17	Maïlys Dhia Traoré	(substituted on) 51'
PR	18	Clara Joyeux	(substituted on) 62'
LK	19	Safi N'Diaye	(substituted on) 47'
FL	20	Julie Annery	(substituted on) 47'
FH	21	Morgane Peyronnet	(substituted on) 65'
CE	22	Nassira Konde	(substituted on) 5'	(substituted off) 17'		(substituted on) 35'
WG	23	Marine Ménager	(substituted on) 51'
Coach:
Annick Hayraud

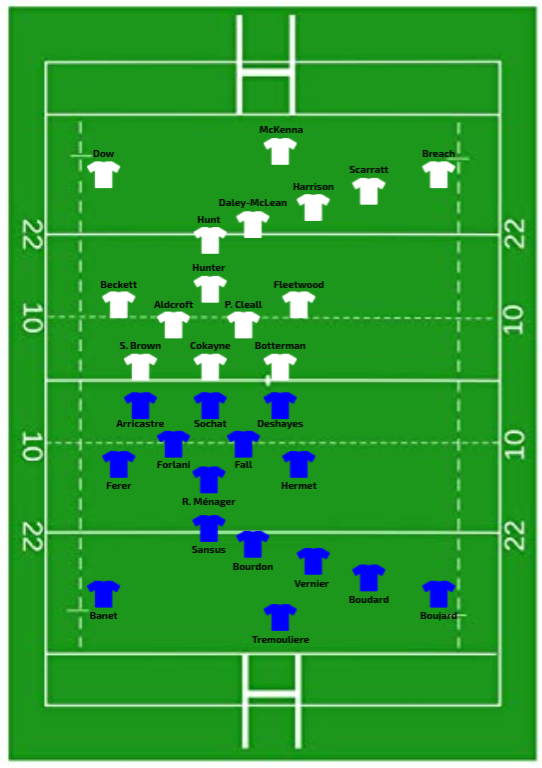

FB	15	Sarah McKenna
RW	14	Abigail Dow
OC	13	Emily Scarratt
IC	12	Zoe Harrison	(substituted off) 56'
LW	11	Jess Breach
FH	10	Katy Daley-McLean
SH	9	Natasha Hunt	(substituted off) 56'
N8	8	Sarah Hunter (c)
OF	7	Victoria Fleetwood	(substituted off) 62'
BF	6	Sarah Beckett
RL	5	Zoe Aldcroft
LL	4	Poppy Cleall	(substituted off) 74'
TP	3	Shaunagh Brown	(substituted off) 40'
HK	2	Amy Cokayne	(substituted off) 49'
LP	1	Hannah Botterman	(substituted off) 49'
Replacements:
HK	16	Lark Davies	(substituted on) 49'
PR	17	Victoria Cornborough	(substituted on) 49'
PR	18	Sarah Bern	(substituted on) 40'
LK	19	Harriet Millar-Mills	(substituted on) 74'
FL	20	Amelia Harper	(substituted on) 62'
SH	21	Leanne Riley	(substituted on) 56'
CE	22	Amber Reed	(substituted on) 56'
FB	23	Emily Scott
Coach:
Simon Middleton

Player of the Match:
Emily Scarratt (England)

Touch judges:
Joy Neville (Ireland)
Beatrice Benvenuti (Italy)
Television match official:
Simon McDowell (Ireland)

Test: 1382	2 February 2020	Ireland	18–14	Scotland (1 BP)	Donnybrook, Dublin
	13:00 GMT (UTC±00:00)	Try: Moloney 10' m Naoupu 15' m Parsons 67' m Pen: Murphy (1/1) 5'	Report	Try: Thomson 40' +2 c Wassell 76' c Con: Nelson (1/1) 40' +3; Skeldon (1/1) 77'	Referee: Aurélie Groizeleau (France)

Team details

FB	15	Lauren Delany
RW	14	Aoife Doyle		(substituted off) 69'
OC	13	Sene Naoupu
IC	12	Michelle Claffey
LW	11	Beibhinn Parsons
FH	10	Ellen Murphy		(substituted off) 69'
SH	9	Kathryn Dane
N8	8	Anne Caplice
OF	7	Edel McMahon			(substituted off) 75'
BF	6	Ciara Griffin (c)		(substituted off) 40'
RL	5	Nichola Fryday
LL	4	Aoife McDermott		(substituted off) 67'
TP	3	Linda Djougang		(substituted off) 55'	(substituted on) 75'
HK	2	Cliodhna Moloney		(substituted off) 27'
LP	1	Lindsay Peat		(substituted off) 58'
Replacements:
HK	16	Victoria O'Mahony		(substituted on) 27'
PR	17	Laura Feely		(substituted on) 58'
PR	18	Leah Lyons	(yellow card) 74'	(substituted on) 55'
LK	19	Ciara Cooney		(substituted on) 67'
FL	20	Dorothy Wall		(substituted on) 40'
SH	21	Nicole Cronin		(substituted on) 69'
CE	22	Claire Keohane		(substituted on) 69'
WG	23	Laura Sheehan
Coach:
Adam Griggs

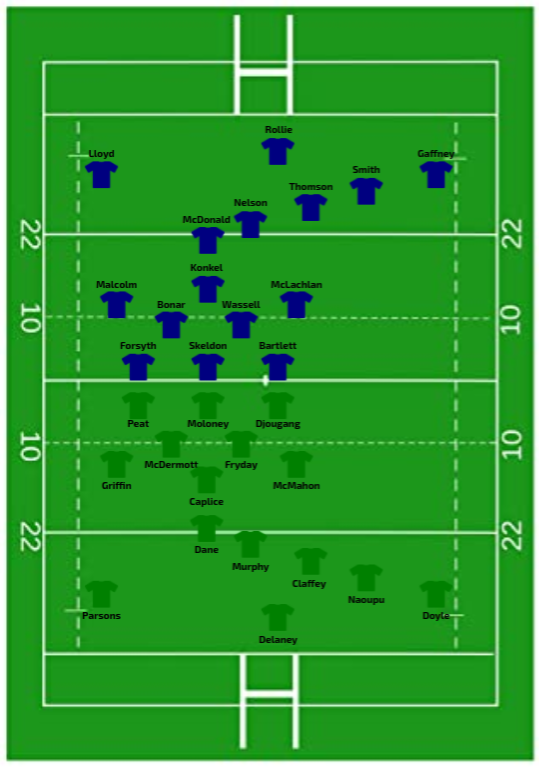

FB	15	Chloe Rollie
RW	14	Rhona Lloyd
OC	13	Hannah Smith
IC	12	Lisa Thomson
LW	11	Megan Gaffney	(substituted off) 70'
FH	10	Helen Nelson	(substituted off) 51'	(substituted on) 70'
SH	9	Mairi McDonald
N8	8	Jade Konkel	(substituted off) 77'
OF	7	Rachel McLachlan	(substituted off) 58'
BF	6	Rachel Malcolm (c)	(substituted off) 69'
RL	5	Sarah Bonar
LL	4	Emma Wassell
TP	3	Mairi Forsyth
HK	2	Lana Skeldon
LP	1	Leah Bartlett	(substituted off) 61'
Replacements:
HK	16	Molly Wright	(substituted on) 77'
PR	17	Panashe Muzambe
PR	18	Lisa Cockburn	(substituted on) 61'
LK	19	Siobhan Cattigan	(substituted on) 58'
FL	20	Louise McMillan	(substituted on) 69'
SH	21	Sarah Law	(substituted on) 51'	(substituted off) 70'
CE	22	Evie Tonkin	(substituted on) 70'
CE	23	Alex Wallace
Coach:
Philip Doyle

Player of the Match:
Edel McMahon (Ireland)

Touch judges:
Clara Munarini (Italy)
Doriane Domenjo (France)
Television match official:
Éric Gauzins (France)

Test: 1383	2 February 2020	(1 BP) Wales	15–19	Italy	Cardiff Arms Park, Cardiff
	14:00 GMT (UTC±00:00)	Try: H. Jones 37' c K. Jones 64' m Con: Wilkins (1/2) 38'; Pen: Wilkins (1/1) 3'	Report	Try: Bettoni 33' m Magatti 54' c Stefan 59' c Con: Sillari (2/3) 56', 60'	Referee: Sara Cox (England)

Team details

FB	15	Kayleigh Powell	(substituted off) 35'
RW	14	Jasmine Joyce
OC	13	Hannah Jones
IC	12	Kerin Lake
LW	11	Lisa Neumann
FH	10	Robyn Wilkins
SH	9	Keira Bevan	(substituted off) 75'
N8	8	Siwan Lillicrap (c)
OF	7	Bethan Lewis	(substituted off) 61'
BF	6	Alex Callendar	(substituted off) 49'
RL	5	Gwen Crabb
LL	4	Natalia John	(substituted off) 50'
TP	3	Cerys Hale
HK	2	Kelsey Jones
LP	1	Gwenllian Pyrs
Replacements:
HK	16	Molly Kelly
PR	17	Cara Hope
PR	18	Ruth Lewis
LK	19	Georgia Evans	(substituted on) 61'
FL	20	Alisha Butchers	(substituted on) 50'
SH	21	Manon Johnes	(substituted on) 49'
CE	22	Ffion Lewis	(substituted on) 75'
WG	23	Paige Randall	(substituted on) 35'
Coach:
Chris Horsman

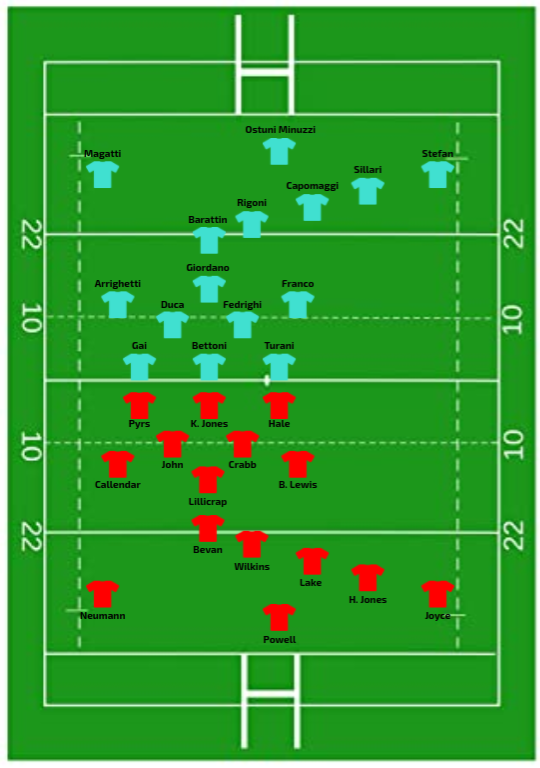

FB	15	Vittoria Ostuni Minuzzi
RW	14	Maria Magatti
OC	13	Michela Sillari
IC	12	Beatrice Capomaggi
LW	11	Sofia Stefan
FH	10	Beatrice Rigoni
SH	9	Sara Barattin
N8	8	Elisa Giordano (c)
OF	7	Giada Franco
BF	6	Ilaria Arrighetti
RL	5	Giordana Duca	(substituted off) 40'
LL	4	Valeria Fedrighi
TP	3	Lucia Gai
HK	2	Malissa Bettoni
LP	1	Silvia Turani
Replacements:
HK	16	Giuilia Cerato
PR	17	Erika Skofca
PR	18	Michela Merlo
LK	19	Sara Tounesi	(substituted on) 40'
FL	20	Lucia Cammarano
SH	21	Francesca Sgorbini
CE	22	Laura Paganini
CE	23	Benedetta Mancini
Coach:
Andrea di Giandomenico

Player of the Match:
Giada Franco (Italy)

Touch judges:
Nikki O'Donnell (England)
Katherine Ritchie (England)
Television match official:
David Grashoff (England)

=== Week 2 ===
Test: 1384	8 February 2020	(1 BP) France	45–10	Italy	Stade de Beaublanc, Limoges
	21:00 CET (UTC+01:00)	Try: Forlani 5' c Banet (2) 17' c, 32' c Annery 44' c Penalty try 78'; Sansus 80' +1 c Con: Trémoulière (4/4) 6', 18', 33', 45'; Bourdon (1/1) 80' +2; Pen: Trémoulière (1/1) 12'	Report	Try: Barattin 40' +5 c Con: Sillari (1/1) 40' +6; Pen: Sillari (1/1) 27'	Referee: Hollie Davidson (Scotland)

Team details

FB	15	Jessy Trémoulière	(substituted off) 61'
RW	14	Cyrielle Banet	(substituted off) 70'
OC	13	Nassira Konde	(substituted off) 60'
IC	12	Morgane Peyronnet
LW	11	Marine Ménager
FH	10	Pauline Bourdon
SH	9	Laure Sansus
N8	8	Romane Ménager
OF	7	Julie Annery
BF	6	Céline Ferer	(substituted off) 59'
RL	5	Audrey Forlani
LL	4	Safi N'Diaye (c)	(substituted off) 64'
TP	3	Clara Joyeux
HK	2	Caroline Thomas	(substituted off) 59'
LP	1	Dhia Maïlys Traoré	(substituted off) 59'
Replacements:
HK	16	Agathe Sochat	(substituted on) 59'
PR	17	Lise Arricastre	(substituted on) 59'
PR	18	Annaëlle Deshayes
LK	19	Madoussou Fall	(substituted on) 64'
FL	20	Gaëlle Hermet	(substituted on) 59'
CE	21	Camille Boudard	(substituted on) 60'
CE	22	Marie-Aurélie Castel	(substituted on) 70'
WG	23	Caroline Boujard	(substituted on) 61'
Coach:
Annick Hayraud

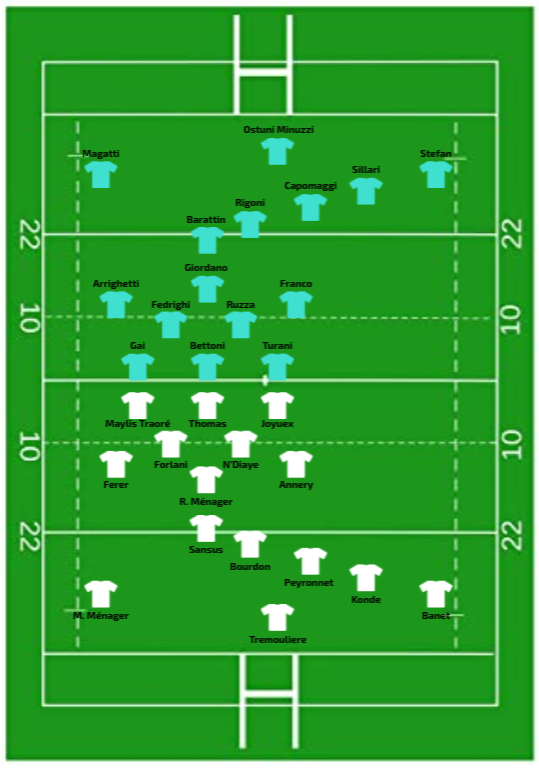

FB	15	Vittoria Ostuni Minuzzi
RW	14	Maria Magatti
OC	13	Michela Sillari
IC	12	Beatrice Capomaggi		(substituted off) 63'
LW	11	Sofia Stefan	(yellow card) 77'
FH	10	Beatrice Rigoni		(substituted off) 76'
SH	9	Sara Barattin
N8	8	Elisa Giordano (c)
OF	7	Giaga Franco		(substituted off) 56'
BF	6	Ilaria Arrighetti		(substituted off) 45'
RL	5	Valeria Fedrighi
LL	4	Valerina Ruzza		(substituted off) 29'
TP	3	Lucia Gai		(substituted off) 59'
HK	2	Melisa Bettoni		(substituted off) 59'
LP	1	Silvia Turani		(substituted off) 75'
Replacements:
HK	16	Giulia Cerato		(substituted on) 59'
PR	17	Michela Merlo		(substituted on) 75'
PR	18	Sara Tounsei		(substituted on) 59'
LK	19	Giordana Dana		(substituted on) 27'
FL	20	Lucia Cammarano		(substituted on) 45'
FL	21	Francesca Sgorbini		(substituted on) 56'
FH	22	Laura Paganni		(substituted on) 76'
FB	23	Benedetta Mancini		(substituted on) 63'
Coach:
Andrea di Giandomenico

Player of the Match:
Julie Annery (France)

Touch judges:
Nikki O'Donnell (England)
Katherine Ritchie (England)
Television match official:
Simon McDowell (Ireland)

Test:	9 February 2020	Scotland	(Postponed)	England	Scotstoun Stadium, Glasgow
	12:10 GMT (UTC±00:00)		Report		Referee: Clara Munarini (Italy)

Team details

FB	15	Chloe Rollie
RW	14	Rhona Lloyd
OC	13	Lisa Thomson
IC	12	Helen Nelson
LW	11	Evie Tonkin
FH	10	Sarah Law
SH	9	Mairi McDonald
N8	8	Jade Konkel
OF	7	Rachel McMachlan
BF	6	Rachel Malcolm (c)
RL	5	Sarah Bonar
LL	4	Emma Wassell
TP	3	Mairi Forsyth
HK	2	Lana Skeldon
LP	1	Leah Bartlett
Replacements:
HK	16	Molly Wright
PR	17	Panashe Muzambe
PR	18	Lisa Cockburn
LK	19	Siobhan Cattigan
FL	20	Louise McMillan
SH	21	Rachel Law
CE	22	Annabel Sergeant
WG	23	Alex Wallace
Coach:
Philip Doyle

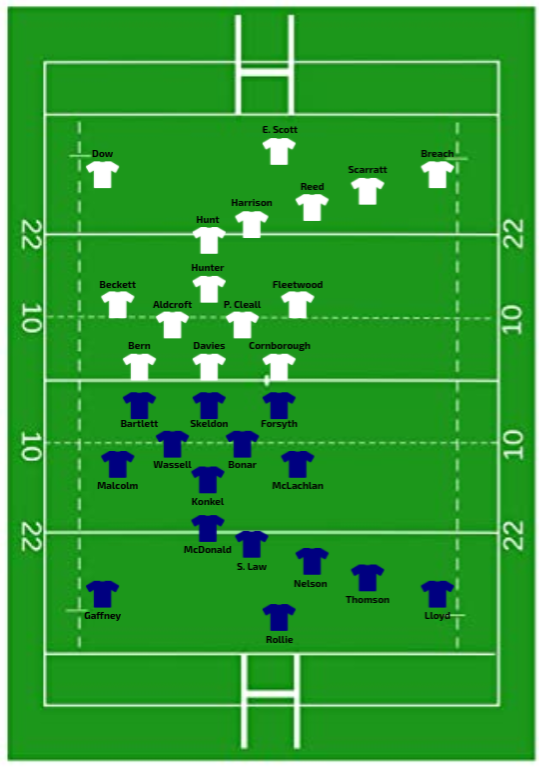

FB	15	Emily Scott
RW	14	Abigail Dow
OC	13	Emily Scarratt
IC	12	Amber Reed
LW	11	Jess Breach
FH	10	Zoe Harrison
SH	9	Natasha Hunt
N8	8	Sarah Hunter (c)
OF	7	Victoria Fleetwood
BF	6	Sarah Beckett
RL	5	Zoe Aldcroft
LL	4	Poppy Cleall
TP	3	Sarah Bern
HK	2	Lark Davies
LP	1	Victoria Cornborough
Replacements:
HK	16	Amy Cokayne
PR	17	Hannah Botterman
PR	18	Shaunagh Brown
LK	19	Harriet Millar-Mills
FL	20	Amelia Harper
SH	21	Claudia MacDonald
FH	22	Katy Daley-McLean
FB	23	Sarah McKenna
Coach:
Simon Middleton

Touch judges:
Aurélie Groizeleau (France)
Doriane Domenjo (France)
Television match official:
Stefano Penne (Italy)

Test: 1385	9 February 2020	(1 BP) Ireland	31–12	Wales	Donnybrook, Dublin
	13:00 GMT (UTC±00:00)	Try: Parsons 17' m Moloney 26' c Delany 33' m Djougang 42' c Penalty try 80' +1; Con: Keohane (2/4) 27', 44'	Report	Try: Smyth 40' m Lillicrap 47' c Con: Wilkins (1/2) 47'	Referee: Aimee Barrett-Theron (South Africa)

Team details

FB	15	Eimear Considine	(substituted off) 66'
RW	14	Lauren Delany
OC	13	Sene Naoupu
IC	12	Michelle Claffey
LW	11	Beibhinn Parsons
FH	10	Claire Keohane	(substituted off) 70'
SH	9	Kathryn Dane
N8	8	Anne Caplice
OF	7	Edel McMahon
BF	6	Ciara Griffin (c)	(substituted off) 62'
RL	5	Judy Bobbett
LL	4	Aoife McDermott	(substituted off) 58'
TP	3	Linda Djougang
HK	2	Cliodhna Moloney
LP	1	Lindsay Peat	(substituted off) 72'
Replacements:
HK	16	Victoria O'Mahony
PR	17	Laura Feely	(substituted on) 72'
PR	18	Anne-Marie O'Hara
LK	19	Ciara Cooney	(substituted on) 58'
FL	20	Dorothy Wall	(substituted on) 62'
SH	21	Nicole Cronin
CE	22	Larissa Muldoon	(substituted on) 70'
WG	23	Aoife Doyle	(substituted on) 66'
Coach:
Adam Griggs

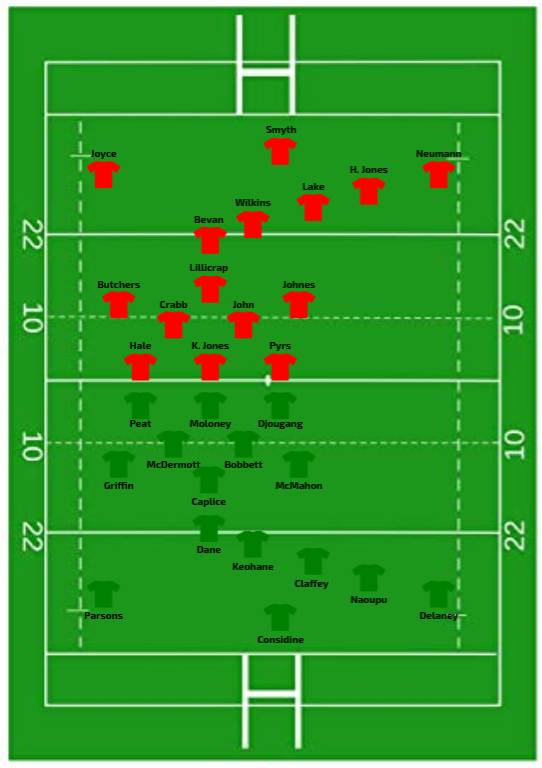

FB	15	Lauren Smyth
RW	14	Jasmine Joyce		(substituted off) 68'
OC	13	Hannah Jones
IC	12	Kerin Lake
LW	11	Lisa Neumann
FH	10	Robyn Wilkins
SH	9	Keira Bevan		(substituted off) 75'
N8	8	Siwan Lillicrap (c)		(substituted off) 36'	(substituted on) 45'
OF	7	Manon Johnes		(substituted off) 60'
BF	6	Alisha Butchers		(substituted off) 68'
RL	5	Gwen Crabb
LL	4	Natalia John		(substituted off) 43'
TP	3	Cerys Hale		(substituted off) 78'
HK	2	Kelsey Jones		(substituted off) 78'
LP	1	Gwenllian Pyrs	(yellow card) 35'			(substituted off) 74'
Replacements:
HK	16	Molly Kelly		(substituted on) 78'
PR	17	Cara Hope		(substituted on) 36'	(substituted off) 45'	(substituted on) 74'
PR	18	Ruth Lewis		(substituted on) 78'
LK	19	Georgia Evans		(substituted on) 68'
FL	20	Bethan Lewis		(substituted on) 43'
FL	21	Alex Callender		(substituted on) 60'
SH	22	Ffion Lewis		(substituted on) 75'
WG	23	Paige Randall		(substituted on) 68'
Coach:
Chris Horsman

Player of the Match:
Cliodhna Moloney (Ireland)

Touch judges:
Sara Cox (England)
Beatrice Benvenuti (Italy)
Television match official:
Neil Paterson (Scotland)

Test: 1386	10 February 2020	Scotland	0–53	England (1 BP)	Murrayfield Stadium, Edinburgh
	13:30 GMT (UTC±00:00)		Report	Try: Bern 3' c Breach 31' m Dow (2) 37' c, 56' m E. Scott (2) 43' m, 49' c Hunter 64' c MacDonald 77' c Con: Scarratt (5/8) 4', 38', 49', 65', 78'; Pen: Scarratt (1/1) 19'	Referee: Clara Munarini (Italy)

Team details

FB	15	Chloe Rollie
RW	14	Rhona Lloyd
OC	13	Lisa Thomson
IC	12	Helen Nelson
LW	11	Evie Tonkin
FH	10	Sarah Law	(substituted off) 49'
SH	9	Mairi McDonald
N8	8	Jade Konkel
OF	7	Rachel McMachlan	(substituted off) 46'
BF	6	Rachel Malcolm (c)
RL	5	Sarah Bonar
LL	4	Emma Wassell	(substituted off) 66'
TP	3	Mairi Forsyth	(substituted off) 71'	(substituted on) 79'
HK	2	Lana Skeldon	(substituted off) 49'	(substituted on) 74'
LP	1	Leah Bartlett	(substituted off) 58'
Replacements:
HK	16	Molly Wright	(substituted on) 49'
PR	17	Panashe Muzambe	(substituted on) 71'
PR	18	Lisa Cockburn	(substituted on) 58'	(substituted off) 79'
LK	19	Siobhan Cattigan	(substituted on) 46'
FL	20	Louise McMillan	(substituted on) 66'	(substituted off) 74'
SH	21	Rachel Law
FH	22	Annabel Sergeant	(substituted on) 49'
WG	23	Alex Wallace
Coach:
Philip Doyle

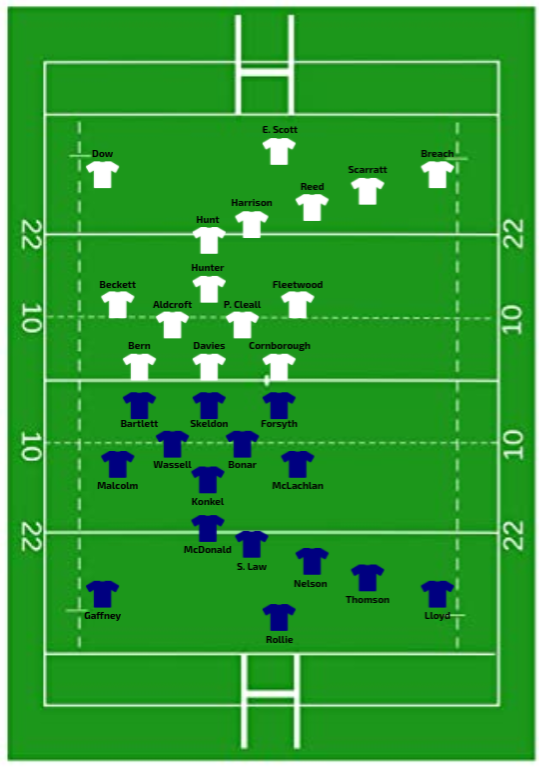

FB	15	Emily Scott
RW	14	Abigail Dow	(substituted off) 63'
OC	13	Emily Scarratt
IC	12	Amber Reed
LW	11	Jess Breach
FH	10	Zoe Harrison	(substituted off) 58'
SH	9	Natasha Hunt	(substituted off) 58'
N8	8	Sarah Hunter (c)
OF	7	Victoria Fleetwood	(substituted off) 58'
BF	6	Sarah Beckett
RL	5	Zoe Aldcroft
LL	4	Poppy Cleall	(substituted off) 58'
TP	3	Sarah Bern	(substituted off) 58'
HK	2	Lark Davies	(substituted off) 50'
LP	1	Victoria Cornborough	(substituted off) 50'
Replacements:
HK	16	Amy Cokayne	(substituted on) 50'
PR	17	Hannah Botterman	(substituted on) 50'
PR	18	Shaunagh Brown	(substituted on) 58'
LK	19	Harriet Millar-Mills	(substituted on) 58'
FL	20	Amelia Harper	(substituted on) 58'
SH	21	Claudia MacDonald	(substituted on) 58'
FH	22	Katy Daley-McLean	(substituted on) 58'
FB	23	Sarah McKenna	(substituted on) 63'
Coach:
Simon Middleton

Player of the Match:
Emily Scott (England)

Touch judges:
Aurélie Groizeleau (France)
Doriane Domenjo (France)
Television match official:
Stefano Penne (Italy)

=== Week 3 ===
Test: 1387	23 February 2020	Wales	0–50	France (1 BP)	Cardiff Arms Park, Cardiff
	12:00 GMT (UTC±00:00)		Report	Try: Banet (2) 3' m, 37' c Sansus (2) 30' c, 51' m N'Diaye 47' c M. Ménager 63' c Annery 67' m Boudard 76' c Con: Trémoulière (5/8) 31', 39', 48', 64', 78'	Referee: Nikki O'Donnell (England)

Team details

FB	15	Kayleigh Powell
RW	14	Caitlin Lewis
OC	13	Megan Webb	(substituted off) 65'
IC	12	Kerin Lake	(substituted off) 26'
LW	11	Lisa Neumann
FH	10	Robyn Wilkins
SH	9	Keira Bevan	(substituted off) 71'
N8	8	Siwan Lillicrap (c)
OF	7	Bethan Lewis	(substituted off) 71'
BF	6	Alisha Butchers
RL	5	Gwen Crabb
LL	4	Georgia Evans	(substituted off) 60'
TP	3	Cerys Hale
HK	2	Kelsey Jones
LP	1	Gwenllian Pyrs	(substituted off) 70'
Replacements:
HK	16	Molly Kelly
PR	17	Cara Hope	(substituted on) 70'
PR	18	Ruth Lewis
LK	19	Robyn Lock	(substituted on) 60'
FL	20	Manon Johnes	(substituted on) 71'
SH	21	Ffion Lewis	(substituted on) 71'
CE	22	Courtney Keight	(substituted on) 65'
FB	23	Lauren Smyth	(substituted on) 26'
Coach:
Chris Horsman

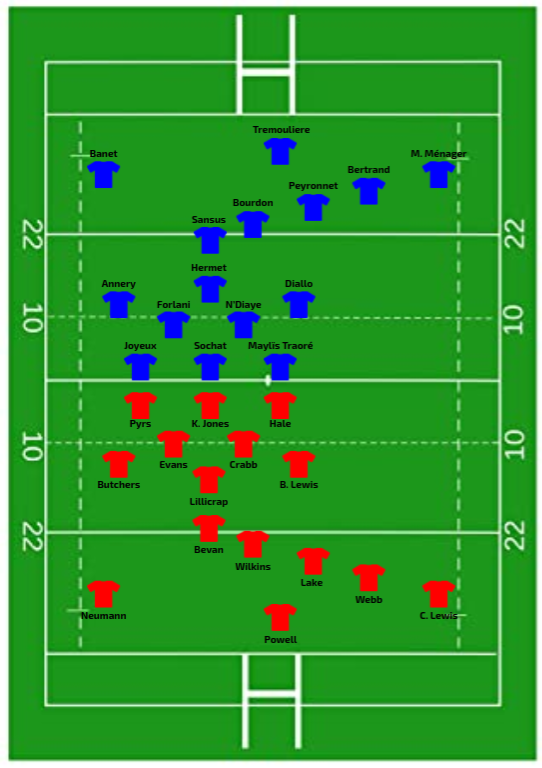

FB	15	Jessy Trémoulière
RW	14	Cyrielle Banet	(substituted off) 59'
OC	13	Coralie Bertrand
IC	12	Morgane Peyronnet	(substituted off) 59'
LW	11	Marine Ménager
FH	10	Pauline Bourdon
SH	9	Laure Sansus	(substituted off) 67'
N8	8	Gaëlle Hermet (c)
OF	7	Coumba Diallo
BF	6	Julie Annery
RL	5	Audrey Forlani	(substituted off) 52'
LL	4	Safi N'Diaye	(substituted off) 59'
TP	3	Clara Joyeux
HK	2	Agathe Sochat	(substituted off) 66'
LP	1	Dhia Maïlys Traoré	(substituted off) 40'
Replacements:
HK	16	Laure Touyé	(substituted on) 66'
PR	17	Lise Arricastre	(substituted on) 40'
PR	18	Yllana Brosseau
LK	19	Lénaïg Corson	(substituted on) 53'
FL	20	Céline Ferer	(substituted on) 59'
SH	21	Yanna Rivoalen	(substituted on) 67'
FH	22	Camille Boudard	(substituted on) 59'
FB	23	Caroline Boujard	(substituted on) 59'
Coach:
Annick Hayraud

Player of the Match:
Pauline Bourdon (France)

Touch judges:
Beatrice Benvenuti (Italy)
Clare Daniels (England)
Television match official:
Claire Hodnett (England)

Test: 1388	23 February 2020	(1 BP) England	27–0	Ireland	Castle Park, Doncaster
	12:45 GMT (UTC±00:00)	Try: Hunter 4' c Dow 14' m Breach 27' m Fleetwood 40' m McKenna 59' m Con: Scarratt (1/5) 4'	Report		Referee: Hollie Davidson (Scotland)

Team details

FB	15	Sarah McKenna	(substituted off) 65'
RW	14	Abigail Dow
OC	13	Emily Scarratt
IC	12	Amber Reed
LW	11	Jess Breach
FH	10	Katy Daley-McLean	(substituted off) 65'
SH	9	Leanne Riley	(substituted off) 55'
N8	8	Sarah Hunter (c)
OF	7	Victoria Fleetwood	(substituted off) 65'
BF	6	Sarah Beckett	(substituted off) 63'
RL	5	Zoe Aldcroft
LL	4	Poppy Cleall
TP	3	Sarah Bern	(substituted off) 55'
HK	2	Lark Davies	(substituted off) 55'
LP	1	Victoria Cornborough	(substituted off) 65'
Replacements:
HK	16	Amy Cokayne	(substituted on) 55'
PR	17	Detysha Harper	(substituted on) 65'
PR	18	Shaunagh Brown	(substituted on) 55'
LK	19	Harriet Millar-Mills	(substituted on) 63'
FL	20	Amelia Harper	(substituted on) 65'
SH	21	Natasha Hunt	(substituted on) 55'
FH	22	Zoe Harrison	(substituted on) 65'
FB	23	Emily Scott	(substituted on) 65'
Coach:
Simon Middleton

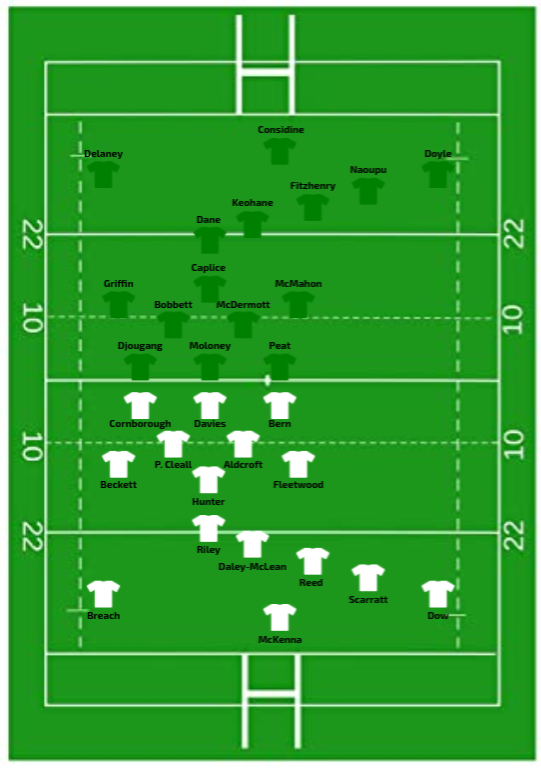

FB	15	Eimear Considine
RW	14	Lauren Delany
OC	13	Sene Naoupu		(substituted off) 75'
IC	12	Katie Fitzhenry
LW	11	Aoife Doyle	(substituted off) 63'	(substituted on) 75'
FH	10	Claire Keohane	(substituted off) 61'
SH	9	Kathryn Dane	(substituted off) 63'
N8	8	Anne Caplice
OF	7	Edel McMahon
BF	6	Ciara Griffin (c)
RL	5	Judy Bobbett
LL	4	Aoife McDermott	(substituted off) 48'
TP	3	Linda Djougang	(substituted off) 61'
HK	2	Cliodhna Moloney	(substituted off) 66'
LP	1	Lindsay Peat	(substituted off) 13'
Replacements:
HK	16	Victoria O'Mahony
PR	17	Laura Feely	(substituted on) 13'
PR	18	Leah Lyons	(substituted on) 61'
LK	19	Ciara Cooney	(substituted on) 48'
FL	20	Dorothy Wall	(substituted on) 66'
SH	21	Nicole Cronin	(substituted on) 63'
CE	22	Larissa Muldoon	(substituted on) 61'
WG	23	Hannah Tyrrell	(substituted on) 63'
Coach:
Adam Griggs

Player of the Match:
Zoe Aldcroft (England)

Touch judges:
Clara Munarini (Italy)
Beatrice Smussi (Italy)
Television match official:
Neil Paterson (Scotland)

Test:	23 February 2020	Italy	(Postponed)	Scotland	Stadio Giovanni Mari, Legnano
	18:10 CET (UTC+01:00)		Report

Team details

FB	15	Vittoria Ostuni Minuzzi
RW	14	Aura Muzzo
OC	13	Michela Sillari
IC	12	Maria Magatti
LW	11	Sofia Stefan
FH	10	Beatrice Rigoni
SH	9	Sara Barattin
N8	8	Elisa Giordano (c)
OF	7	Lucia Cammarano
BF	6	Ilaria Arrighetti
RL	5	Giordana Duca
LL	4	Valeria Fedrighi
TP	3	Lucia Gai
HK	2	Melisa Bettoni
LP	1	Silvia Turani
Replacements:
HK	16	Giulia Cerato
PR	17	Erika Skofca
PR	18	Michela Merlo
LK	19	Sara Tounsei
FL	20	Francesca Sgorbini
FL	21	Laura Paganini
FH	22	Beatrice Capomaggi
FB	23	Benedetta Mancini
Coach:
Andrea di Giandomenico

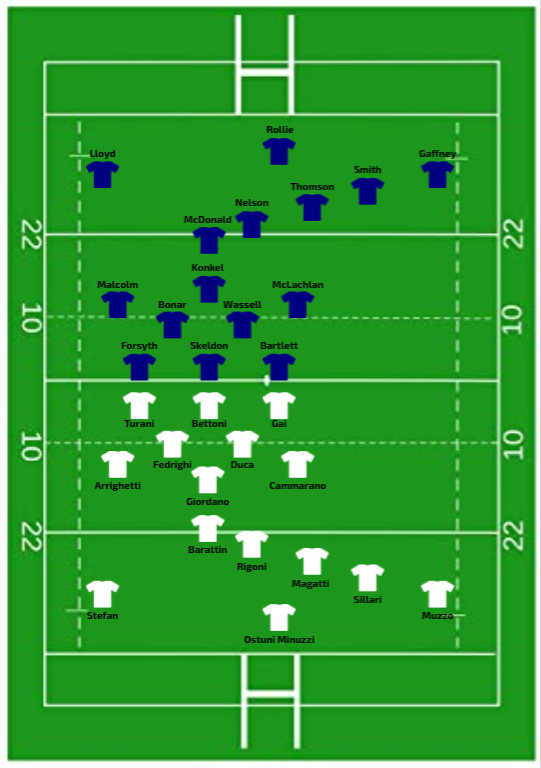

FB	15	Chloe Rollie
RW	14	Rhona Lloyd
OC	13	Hannah Smith
IC	12	Lisa Thomson
LW	11	Megan Gaffney
FH	10	Helen Nelson
SH	9	Mairi McDonald
N8	8	Jade Konkel
OF	7	Rachel McLachlan
BF	6	Rachel Malcolm (c)
RL	5	Sarah Bonar
LL	4	Emma Wassell
TP	3	Mairi Forsyth
HK	2	Lana Skeldon
LP	1	Leah Bartlett
Replacements:
HK	16	Molly Wright
PR	17	Panashe Muzambe
PR	18	Lisa Cockburn
LK	19	Siobhan Cattigan
FL	20	Louise McMillan
SH	21	Sarah Law
FH	22	Rachel Law
WG	23	Evie Tonkin
Coach:
Philip Doyle

Touch judges:
Aurélie Groizeleau (France)
Doriane Domenjo (France)
Television match official:
Olly Hodges (Ireland)

=== Week 4 ===
Test: 1391	7 March 2020	(1 BP) England	66–7	Wales	Twickenham Stoop, London
	12:05 GMT (UTC±00:00)	Try: P. Cleall (3) 7' c, 12' c, 51' c Daley-McLean 28' m Fleetwood 39' c Millar-Mills 43' c Cokayne 56' c Aldcroft 66' c Botterman 71' c McKenna 79' m Con: Scarratt (8/10) 8', 13', 40', 44', 52', 56', 67', 72'	Report	Try: Penalty try 63'	Referee: Amber McLachlan (Australia)

Team details

FB	15	Emily Scott		(substituted off) 40'
RW	14	Lydia Thompson
OC	13	Emily Scarratt (c)
IC	12	Amber Reed		(substituted off) 66'
LW	11	Sarah McKenna
FH	10	Katy Daley-McLean
SH	9	Leanne Riley		(substituted off) 56'
N8	8	Sarah Beckett		(substituted off) 56'
OF	7	Victoria Fleetwood
BF	6	Harriet Millar-Mills
RL	5	Zoe Aldcroft
LL	4	Poppy Cleall		(substituted off) 68'
TP	3	Shaunagh Brown		(substituted off) 50'
HK	2	Amy Cokayne		(substituted off) 62'
LP	1	Victoria Cornborough		(substituted off) 50'
Replacements:
HK	16	Heather Kerr		(substituted on) 62'
PR	17	Hannah Botterman		(substituted on) 50'
PR	18	Sarah Bern		(substituted on) 50'
N8	19	Sarah Hunter		(substituted on) 56'
FL	20	Amelia Harper		(substituted on) 68'
SH	21	Natasha Hunt	(yellow card) 63'	(substituted on) 56'
FH	22	Zoe Harrison		(substituted on) 66'
FB	23	Mia Venner		(substituted on) 40'
Coach:
Simon Middleton

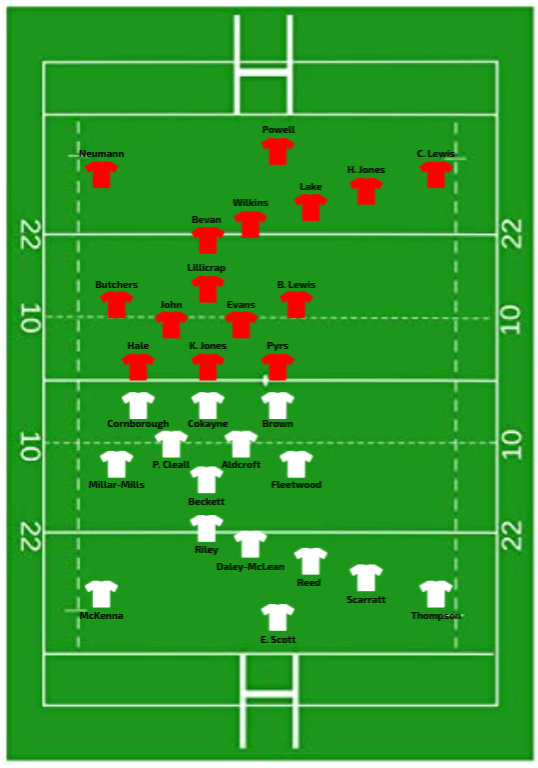

FB	15	Kayleigh Powell	(substituted off) 56'
RW	14	Lisa Neumann
OC	13	Hannah Jones
IC	12	Kerin Lake
LW	11	Caitlin Lewis	(substituted off) 54'
FH	10	Robyn Wilkins
SH	9	Keira Bevan	(substituted off) 74'
N8	8	Siwan Lillicrap (c)
OF	7	Bethan Lewis	(substituted off) 33'
BF	6	Alisha Butchers
RL	5	Natalia John
LL	4	Georgia Evans	(substituted off) 47'
TP	3	Cerys Hale
HK	2	Kelsey Jones
LP	1	Gwenllian Pyrs	(substituted off) 66'
Replacements:
HK	16	Molly Kelly		(substituted on) 73'
PR	17	Cara Hope	(substituted on) 66'
PR	18	Ruth Lewis
LK	19	Gwen Crabb	(substituted on) 47'	(substituted off) 73'
FL	20	Robyn Lock	(substituted on) 33'
SH	21	Ffion Lewis	(substituted on) 74'
FH	22	Hannah Bluck	(substituted on) 54'
CE	23	Lleucu George	(substituted on) 56'
Coach:
Chris Horsman

Player of the Match:
Poppy Cleall (England)

Touch judges:
Clara Munarini (Italy)
Beatrice Benvenuti (Italy)
Television match official:
Olly Hodges (Ireland)

Test:	7 March 2020	Scotland	(Postponed)	France	Scotstoun Stadium, Glasgow
	19:45 GMT (UTC±00:00)

Team details

FB	15	Chloe Rollie
RW	14	Rhona Lloyd
OC	13	Hannah Smith
IC	12	Lisa Thomson
LW	11	Megan Gaffney
FH	10	Helen Nelson
SH	9	Mairi McDonald
N8	8	Jade Konkel
OF	7	Rachel McLachlan
BF	6	Rachel Malcolm (c)
RL	5	Sarah Bonar
LL	4	Emma Wassell
TP	3	Mairi Forsyth
HK	2	Lana Skeldon
LP	1	Leah Bartlett
Replacements:
HK	16	Molly Wright
PR	17	Panashe Muzambe
PR	18	Lisa Cockburn
LK	19	Siobhan Cattigan
FL	20	Louise McMillan
SH	21	Rachel Law
FH	22	Sarah Law
WG	23	Evie Tonkin
Coach:
Philip Doyle

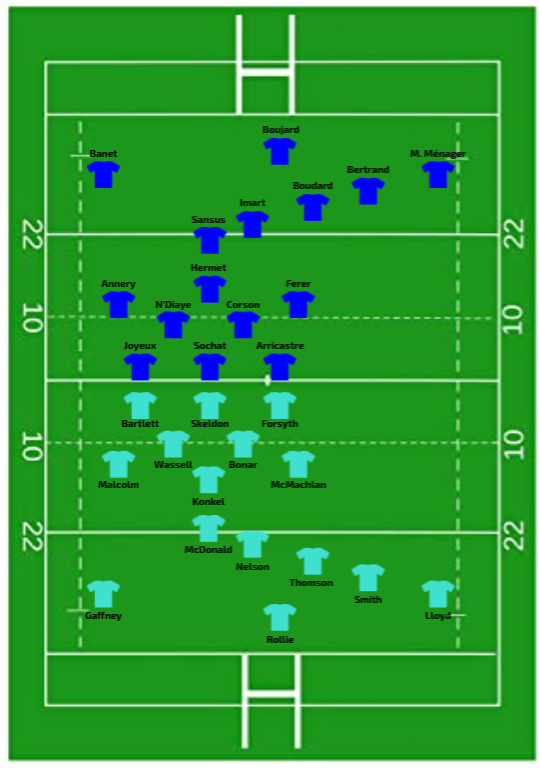

FB	15	Caroline Boujard
RW	14	Cyrielle Banet
OC	13	Coralie Bertrand
IC	12	Camille Boudard
LW	11	Marine Ménager
FH	10	Camille Imart
SH	9	Laure Sansus
N8	8	Gaëlle Hermet (c)
OF	7	Céline Ferer
BF	6	Julie Annery
RL	5	Safi N'Diaye
LL	4	Lénaïg Corson
TP	3	Clara Joyeux
HK	2	Agathe Sochat
LP	1	Lise Arricastre
Replacements:
HK	16	Laure Touyé
PR	17	Maïlys Dhia Traoré
PR	18	Yllana Brosseau
LK	19	Audrey Forlani
FL	20	Emeline Gros
SH	21	Pauline Bourdon
FH	22	Morgane Peyronnet
FB	23	Jessy Trémoulière
Coach:
Annick Hayraud

Touch judges:
Nikki O'Donnell (England)
Clare Daniels (England)
Television match official:
Ian Davies (Wales)

Test:	8 March 2020	Ireland	(Postponed)	Italy	Donnybrook, Dublin
	13:00 GMT (UTC±00:00)		Report		Referee: Rebecca Mahoney (New Zealand) Touch judges: Hollie Davidson (Scotland); Francesca Martin (Wales); Television match official: Ian Davies (Wales)

=== Week 5 ===
Test:	15 March 2020	Wales	(Postponed)	Scotland	Cardiff Arms Park, Cardiff
	13:10 GMT (UTC±00:00)		Report		Referee: Rebecca Mahoney (New Zealand) Touch judges: Nikki O'Donnell (England); Beatrice Benvenuti (Italy); Television match official: Claire Hodnett (England)

Test:	15 March 2020	Italy	(Postponed)	England	Stadio Plebiscito, Padua
	14:30 CET (UTC+01:00)		Report		Referee: Aurelie Groizeleau (France) Touch judges: Hollie Davidson (Scotland); Doriane Domenjo (France); Television match official: Éric Gauzins (France)

Test:	15 March 2020	France	(Postponed)	Ireland	Stadium Lille Métropole, Villeneuve-d'Ascq
	14:30 CET (UTC+01:00)				Referee: Amber McLachlan (Australia) Touch judges: Sara Cox (England); Francesca Martin (Wales); Television match official: Ian Davies (Wales)

=== Reschedule ===
Test: 1393	24 October 2020	Ireland	21–7	Italy	Donnybrook, Dublin
	18:30 IST (UTC+01:00)	Try: Peat 36' c Molloy 40' +1 c Penalty try 70'; Con: Tyrrell (2/2) 37', 40' +2	Report	Try: Bettoni 15' c Con: Sillari (1/1) 16'	Referee: Hollie Davidson (Scotland)

Team details

FB	15	Lauren Delaney	(substituted off) 78'
RW	14	Laura Sheehan
OC	13	Enya Breen
IC	12	Sene Naoupu	(substituted off) 72'
LW	11	Beibhinn Parsons
FH	10	Hannah Tyrrell
SH	9	Kathryn Dane	(substituted off) 78'
N8	8	Ciara Griffin (c)
OF	7	Claire Molloy
BF	6	Dorothy Wall	(substituted off) 72'
RL	5	Ciara Cooney
LL	4	Nicola Fryday	(substituted off) 56'
TP	3	Linda Djougang	(substituted off) 69'
HK	2	Cliodhna Moloney	(substituted off) 69'
LP	1	Lindsay Peat	(substituted off) 78'
Replacements:
HK	16	Neve Jones	(substituted on) 69'
PR	17	Katie O'Dwyer	(substituted on) 78'
PR	18	Leah Lyons	(substituted on) 69'
LK	19	Brittany Hogan	(substituted on) 56'
FL	20	Hannah O'Connor	(substituted on) 72'
SH	21	Ailsa Hughes	(substituted on) 78'
CE	22	Larissa Muldoon	(substituted on) 78'
CE	23	Katie Fitzhenry	(substituted on) 72'
Coach:
Adam Griggs

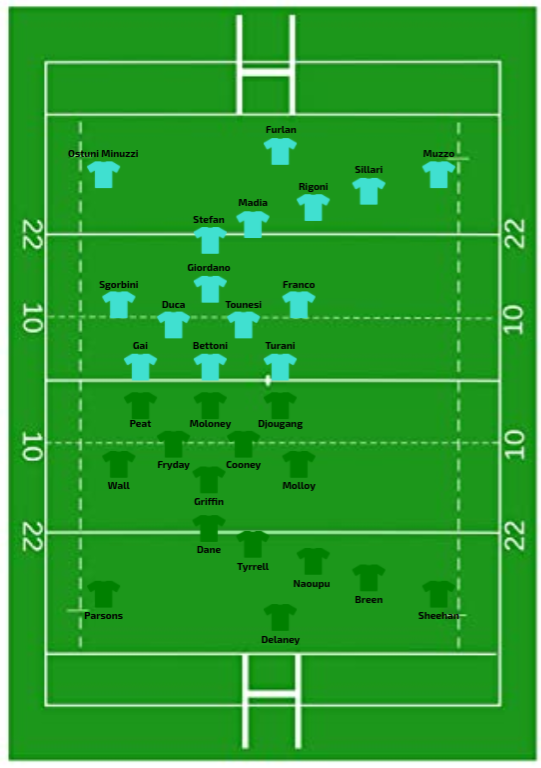

FB	15	Manuela Furlan (c)	(substituted off) 55'
RW	14	Vittori Ostuni Minuzzi
OC	13	Michela Sillari
IC	12	Beatrice Rigoni
LW	11	Aura Muzzo	(substituted off) 71'
FH	10	Veronica Madia	(substituted off) 69'
SH	9	Sofia Stefan
N8	8	Elisa Giordano
OF	7	Giada Franco	(substituted off) 71'
BF	6	Francesca Sgorbini
RL	5	Giordana Duca
LL	4	Sara Tounesi
TP	3	Lucia Gai	(substituted off) 59'
HK	2	Melissa Bettoni	(substituted off) 56'
LP	1	Silvia Turani	(substituted off) 71'
Replacements:
HK	16	Giulia Cerato	(substituted on) 56'
PR	17	Erika Skofca	(substituted on) 71'
PR	18	Michela Merlo		(substituted on) 72'
LK	19	Valeria Fedrighi	(substituted on) 59'
FL	20	Francesca Sberna	(substituted on) 71'
SH	21	Sara Barattin	(substituted on) 55'
FH	22	Beatrice Capomaggi	(substituted on) 69'	(substituted off) 72'
WG	23	Benedetta Mancini	(substituted on) 71'
Coach:
Andrea di Giandomenico

Player of the Match:
Claire Molloy (Ireland)

Test: 1394	25 October 2020	Scotland	13–13	France	Scotstoun Stadium, Glasgow
	14:20 GMT (UTC+00:00)	Try: Shankland 73' c Con: Nelson (1/1) 75'; Pen: Nelson (2/2) 11', 64'	Report	Try: N'Diaye 6' m Sochat 45' m Pen: Trémoulière (1/1) 22'	Referee: Sara Cox (England)

Team details

FB	15	Chloe Rollie
RW	14	Rachel Shankland
OC	13	Hannah Smith
IC	12	Lisa Thomson
LW	11	Megan Gaffney
FH	10	Helen Nelson
SH	9	Mairi McDonald
N8	8	Jade Konkel
OF	7	Rachel McLachlan	(substituted off) 52'
BF	6	Rachel Malcolm (c)	(substituted off) 72'
RL	5	Sarah Bonar
LL	4	Emma Wassell
TP	3	Megan Kennedy	(substituted off) 52'
HK	2	Lana Skeldon	(substituted off) 52'
LP	1	Leah Bartlett
Replacements:
HK	16	Molly Wright	(substituted on) 52'
PR	17	Katie Dougan
PR	18	Christine Belisle	(substituted on) 52'
LK	19	Siobhan Cattigan	(substituted on) 72'
FL	20	Louise McMillan	(substituted on) 52'
SH	21	Rachel Law
FH	22	Abi Evans
WG	23	Annabel Sergeant
Coach:
Bryan Easson

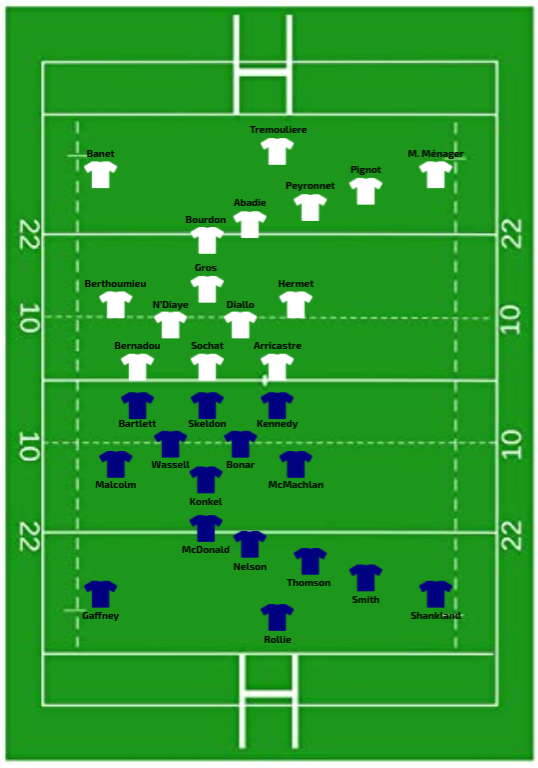

FB	15	Jessy Trémoulière
RW	14	Cyrielle Banet
OC	13	Élise Pignot
IC	12	Morgane Peyrennot	(substituted off) 29'
LW	11	Marine Ménager
FH	10	Audrey Abadie
SH	9	Pauline Bourdon	(substituted off) 55'
N8	8	Émeline Gros
OF	7	Gaëlle Hermet (c)	(substituted off) 47'
BF	6	Axelle Berthoumieu
RL	5	Safi N'Diaye
LL	4	Coumba Diallo	(substituted off) 47'
TP	3	Rose Bernadou	(substituted off) 55'
HK	2	Agathe Sochat	(substituted off) 47'
LP	1	Lise Arricastre	(substituted off) 47'
Replacements:
HK	16	Laure Touyé	(substituted on) 47'
PR	17	Maïlys Dhia Traoré	(substituted on) 47'
PR	18	Clara Joyeux	(substituted on) 55'
LK	19	Lénaïg Corson	(substituted on) 47'	(substituted off) 58'
FL	20	Marjorie Mayans	(substituted on) 47'
SH	21	Yanna Rivoalen	(substituted on) 55'
FH	22	Camille Boudaud	(substituted on) 29'	(substituted off) 72'
WG	23	Caroline Boujard		(substituted on) 72'
Coach:
Annick Hayraud

Player of the Match:
Jade Konkel (Scotland)

Test:	1 November 2020	Wales	(Cancelled)	Scotland	Cardiff City Stadium, Cardiff
	16:15 GMT (UTC+00:00)				Referee: Clara Munarini (Italy)

Test: 1395	1 November 2020	Italy	0–54	England (1 BP)	Stadio Sergio Lanfranchi, Parma
	18:00 CET (UTC+01:00)		Report	Try: Kildunne 4' c P. Cleall 16' c Scarratt 31' c Ward 36' c Bern 59' c Breach 69' m Riley 78' c Packer 80' +2 c Con: Scarratt (5/5) 6', 17', 32', 37', 60'; Harrison (2/3) 79', 80' +3	Referee: Aurélie Groizeleau (France)

Team details

FB	15	Manuela Furlan (c)	(substituted off) 54'
RW	14	Maria Magatti
OC	13	Michela Sillari
IC	12	Beatrice Rigoni
LW	11	Sofia Stefan
FH	10	Veronica Madia	(substituted off) 74'
SH	9	Sara Barattin	(substituted off) 61'
N8	8	Elisa Giordano
OF	7	Giada Franco
BF	6	Francesca Sgorbini	(substituted off) 74'
RL	5	Giordana Duca	(substituted off) 79'
LL	4	Valeria Fedrighi	29' to 40'		(substituted off) 62'
TP	3	Lucia Gai
HK	2	Melissa Bettoni	(substituted off) 62'
LP	1	Silvia Turani	(substituted off) 78'
Replacements:
HK	16	Giulia Cerato	(substituted on) 78'
PR	17	Erika Skofca	(substituted on) 62'
PR	18	Michela Merlo	(substituted on) 79'
LK	19	Sara Tounesi	(substituted on) 29'	(substituted off) 40'	(substituted on) 62'
FL	20	Francesca Sberna	(substituted on) 74'
FB	21	Vittoria Ostuni Minuzzi	(substituted on) 54'
WG	22	Aura Muzzo	(substituted on) 61'
WG	23	Benedetta Mancini	(substituted on) 74'
Coach:
Andrea di Giandomenico

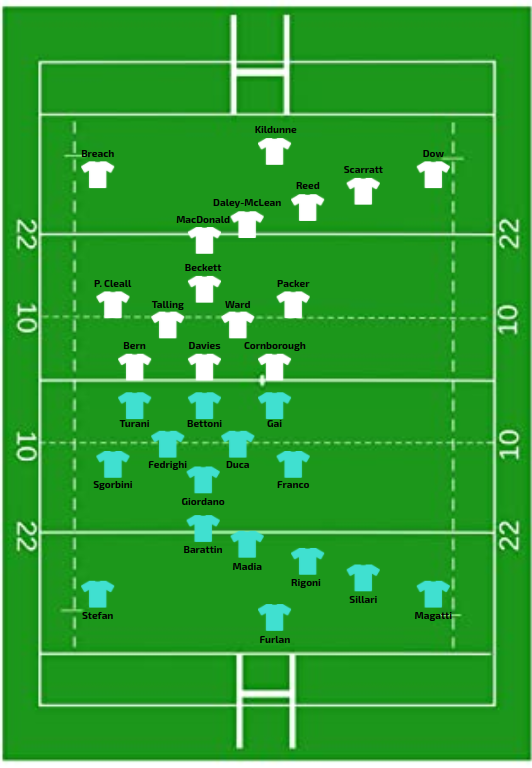

FB	15	Ellie Kildunne
RW	14	Jess Breach
OC	13	Emily Scarratt (c)	(substituted off) 62'
IC	12	Amber Reed
LW	11	Abigail Dow
FH	10	Katy Daley-McLean	(substituted off) 61'
SH	9	Claudia MacDonald	(substituted off) 61'
N8	8	Sarah Beckett
OF	7	Marlie Packer	15' to 20'
BF	6	Poppy Cleall			(substituted off) 57'
RL	5	Morwenna Talling	(substituted off) 62'
LL	4	Abbie Ward
TP	3	Sarah Bern	(substituted off) 62'
HK	2	Lark Davies	(substituted off) 57'
LP	1	Victoria Cornborough	(substituted off) 62'
Replacements:
HK	16	Amy Cokayne	(substituted on) 57'
PR	17	Detysha Harper	(substituted on) 62'
PR	18	Shaunagh Brown	(substituted on) 62'
LK	19	Harriet Millar-Mills	(substituted on) 62'
FL	20	Alex Matthews	(substituted on) 15'	(substituted off) 20'	(substituted on) 57'
SH	21	Leanne Riley	(substituted on) 61'
FH	22	Helena Rowland	(substituted on) 61'
CE	23	Zoe Harrison	(substituted on) 62'
Coach:
Simon Middleton

Player of the Match:
Abbie Ward (England)

Test:	1 November 2020	France	(Cancelled)	Ireland	Stadium Lille Métropole, Villeneuve-d'Ascq
	14:30 CET (UTC+01:00)				Referee: Nikki O'Donnell (England)

Test:	6 December 2020	Italy	(Cancelled)	Scotland	Stadio Sergio Lanfranchi, Parma
	17:20 CET (UTC+01:00)				Referee: Joy Neville (Ireland)

== Statistics ==
=== Top points scorers ===
Pos	Name	Team	Pts
1	Emily Scarratt	England	55
2	Jessy Trémoulière	France	32
3	Cyrielle Banet	France	20
3	Laure Sansus	France	20
3	Abigail Dow	England	20
3	Poppy Cleall	England	20
7	Victoria Fleetwood	England	15
7	Jess Breach	England	15
8	Michela Sillari	Italy	11
10	Beibhinn Parsons	Ireland	10
10	Emily Scott	England	10
10	Julie Annery	France	10
10	Sarah Hunter	England	10
10	Sarah McKenna	England	10
10	Melissa Bettoni	Italy	10
10	Safi N'Diaye	France	10
10	Helen Nelson	Scotland	10
10	Sarah Bern	England	10

=== Top try scorers ===
Pos	Name	Team	Tries
1	Cyrielle Banet	France	4
1	Laure Sansus	France	4
1	Abigail Dow	England	4
1	Poppy Cleall	England	4
5	Victoria Fleetwood	England	3
5	Jess Breach	England	3
8	Beibhinn Parsons	Ireland	2
8	Cliodhna Moloney	Ireland	2
8	Emily Scott	England	2
8	Julie Annery	France	2
8	Sarah Hunter	England	2
8	Sarah McKenna	England	2
8	Melissa Bettoni	Italy	2
8	Safi N'Diaye	France	2
8	Emily Scarratt	England	2
8	Sarah Bern	England	2
