= Leah Bartlett =

Scotland international rugby union player

- Born: 28 August 1998 (age 28) Loughborough, England
- Height: 164 cm (5 ft 5 in)
- Weight: 88 kg (194 lb)

Rugby union career
- Position: Loosehead
Senior career
Years	Team	Apps	(Points)
2016–2018	Loughborough Town		
2018–2023	Loughborough Lightning		
2023–2025	Leicester Tigers		
2025–	Sale Sharks		
International career
Years	Team	Apps	(Points)
2020–	Scotland	49	(35)

Leah Bartlett (born 28 August 1998) is a Scottish rugby player from Lougborough who has played in the Premier 15s and Women's Six Nations, including the 2021 Women's Six Nations Championship. She has also played for the England Women's U20 team.

== Club career ==
Bartlett played for Loughborough Town before moving to Loughborough Lightning in 2018. Bartlett is one of a contingent of Scottish internationals at the Premier 15s club including Jenny Maxwell, Helen Nelson, Emma Wassell and Rachel Malcolm. She frequently starts at Prop for the team. She was part of the Lightning team that finished third in the 2018/19 Tyrells Premier 15s. She signed for Leicester Tigers for the 2023–24 Premiership Women's Rugby season before moving to Sale Sharks ahead of the 2025–26 Premiership Women's Rugby season.

== International career ==
Bartlett was selected for the England U20s team in 2016 when she was studying at Loughborough College. In her first match for the squad, she scored in a 38–15 defeat against Army Women in Aldershot. She played in loosehead position and has commented on the match, "The pressure in the scrums was so powerful, like nothing I had experienced before, but we had a strong front row and I just got on with it."

She qualified to play for Scotland through both her parents being Scottish and was first called up to Scotland in January 2020. She received her first cap that month against Spain, a match which the Scottish team won.

In the 2020 Women's Six Nations Championship, which was disrupted by COVID-19, she was selected by coach Philip Doyle to play in the starting match against Ireland. Doyle said of his decision to add Leah to the squad, “I’ve been unbelievably impressed with Leah since she came into the group. She’s got a young head on her shoulders, but she knows her rugby inside out, especially technically at set piece time.” She was one of 12 Loughborough Lightning players called up to represent their country at that year's Women's Six Nations. She also played in matches against Italy, England and France that year.

In the 2021 Women's Six Nations Championship, she played in the matches against England and Italy and came on as a replacement in the deciding match against Wales, which Scotland won. She was one of eleven Loughborough Lightning players to play in the 2021 Six Nations.

She was named in Scotland's squad for the 2025 Six Nations Championship in March. She also made the Scottish side for the Women's Rugby World Cup in England.

== Personal life ==
Bartlett first started playing rugby when she was five at Loughborough Rugby Club. She received a BTEC in Sports Science from Loughborough College. While studying there, she was shortlisted for the Personal Achievement category in the college's Pride of Charnwood Awards.

She went on to study Sport and Exercise Science at Loughborough University. Her sister, Emma Bartlett (Veterinary Receptionist) work for the newly founded Phoenix Vets in Loughborough. Her mother and father are both Scottish, (born in Stornoway and Inverness respectively) which is why she qualifies for Scotland. She is one of seven siblings and her brother Ewan once played for the Scottish Exiles.
