= Rachel Shankland =

- Born: 26 October 1991 (age 35) Cumnock, Scotland
- Height: 1.63 m (5 ft 4 in)
- Weight: 77 kg (170 lb; 12 st 2 lb)

Rugby union career
- Position: Winger
Senior career
| Years | Team | Apps | (Points) |
| 2016- | Stirling County | | |
International career
| Years | Team | Apps | (Points) |
| 2020– | Scotland | 2 | (0) |

Rachel Shankland (born 26 October 1991) is a Scottish rugby union player from Cumnock who has played for the Scottish Women's team since 2020, including in the 2020 Women's Six Nations and 2021 Women's Six Nations Championship.

== Club career ==
Shankland joined Stirling County in 2016 and has played for the side as a winger since she made the transition from playing for her university.

== International career ==
Shankland first played for Scotland in the disrupted 2020 Women's Six Nations Championship. The winger scored a late try, which was converted by Helen Nelson, in her debut appearance for Scotland against France in a match that saw her side draw with their opponents 13-13. This was considered significant progress for the Scottish team, whose opponents were the 2018 Women's Six Nations victors. In an interview with her local newspaper, The Cumnock Chronicle, she said of the experience,“It was incredible. The whole thing of being selected and named in the starting squad right through to getting the draw and it being a victory for us, it was quite surreal and really exciting. It was hugely positive for the team as a whole and really exciting in terms of the progress we’ve made and how much we’re moving forward.” The side returned to action with Shankland a new addition after COVID-19 disrupted the year's championship.

In the 2021 Women's Six Nations Championship, she played in the back row alongside Megan Gaffney and Chloe Rollie in the opening match against England. She was named as a replacement for the closing match against Wales, which Scotland won.

== Personal life ==
Shankland comes from Cumnock and went to school at Cumnock Academy. She first took up rugby at Stirling University, after a friend introduced her to the sport. She says of the decision, “I walked into it completely oblivious to what I was walking into, but I loved it from that first session and never looked back."

Shankland lives in Perth and works part time as a social worker alongside her rugby training.
