= Molly Wright (rugby union) =

New Zealand rugby player (born 1991)

- Born: 13 May 1991 (age 35) Westport, New Zealand
- Height: 1.6 m (5 ft 3 in)
- Weight: 87 kg (192 lb)

Rugby union career
- Position: Hooker/Prop
- Current team: Sale Sharks Women
2017–2021	Watsonians		(0)
2021–	Sale Sharks		(0)
Provincial / State sides
Years	Team	Apps	(Points)
2013	Otago Spirit	5	(0)
2014–2015	Canterbury	12	(0)
International career
Years	Team	Apps	(Points)
2019–present	Scotland	26	(10)

Molly Wright (born 13 May 1991) is a New Zealand-born Scottish rugby union player who plays for Sale Sharks Women in Premiership Women's Rugby.

She has played for the Scottish Women's team since 2020, including in the 2021 Women's Six Nations Championship. Wright qualifies for Scotland through residency, having moved there in 2017.

== Club career ==
While attending the University of Otago, New Zealand, she played for the establishment's team from 2011 to 2013. During her time playing there, she transitioned from playing in position 12 to hooker. She then played for Otago Spirit in 2013, before moving to New Zealand's Canterbury Women in 2014.

On moving to the UK in 2017, Wright played for Watsonians as a Hooker / Prop since 2017. She played in the final of the 2018 Sarah Beaney Cup against Hillhead Jordan, which Wright's team lost, although Wright scored one of seven tries for her side during the match. In 2019, the Ladies XV won the Sarah Beaney Cup for the first time in the victory over Hillhead Jordanhill, with a final score of 21-17 and Wright was awarded player of the match in the final.

Wright signed for Sale Sharks Women in late 2021, making her debut against Loughborough Lightning.

== International career ==
Wright was selected for the first time for Scotland Women in January 2020 to play against Spain; a match which the team won 36–12. During the match, she came off the bench to score 7 tries. She earned further caps in the disrupted 2020 Women's Six Nations Championship in matches against Ireland and England under the coaching of Philip Doyle.

She says of her appointment to the Scottish team, "If you had asked me three or four years ago I would have seen myself in the position I am in now as an international player I’d probably have said ‘no’, but it has been an opportunity that I have been very lucky to have and I have to keep putting in the hard work.”

In the 2021 Women's Six Nations Championship, Wright was given a three-match ban after being handed a red card for a high tackle on English player Vickii Cornborough shortly after coming on in the team's opening match against England, which was lost 52–10. The ban was later halved at a disciplinary hearing but she missed the games against Italy and Wales as a result.

She was named in Scotland's squad for the 2025 Six Nations Championship in March. She also made the Scottish side for the Women's Rugby World Cup in England.

== Personal life ==
Wright first started playing rugby at the age of four in Reefton, New Zealand, playing for her local club there until the age of 14. Her first coach was her father. She continued to play when she moved to Canada at 16.

Wright moved to Scotland in January 2017 and spent a few months in Dumfries before moving to Edinburgh, where she began playing rugby to meet people.

She is also a qualified physiotherapist. During the COVID-19 epidemic, she was deployed to help rehabilitate patients in the NHS who were recovering from the disease.

== Honours ==
- Player of the match, Sarah Beaney Cup 2019
