= Mairi McDonald =

- Born: 25 November 1997 (age 28) Glasgow, Scotland
- Height: 1.63 m (5 ft 4 in)
- Weight: 58 kg (128 lb; 9 st 2 lb)

Rugby union career
- Position: Scrum-half
Senior career
Years	Team	Apps	(Points)
2010-present	Hillhead Jordanhill		
Provincial / State sides
Years	Team	Apps	(Points)
2023	Glasgow Warriors Women	1	(0)
International career
Years	Team	Apps	(Points)
2018–present	Scotland	6	(0)

Mairi McDonald (born 25 November 1997) is a Scottish rugby player from Glasgow who has played for the Scottish Women's team since 2018, including in the 2020 Women's Six Nations and 2021 Women's Six Nations Championship. She played in her first Six Nations Championship at the age of 22 and has already earned six international caps at the age of 23.

== Club career ==
McDonald joined Hillhead Jordanhill aged 13 and has played for the side ever since. Alongside her team, she won the Sarah Beaney Cup in 2016/17. In 2018, she was part of the team that won the Tennent's Premiership League.

== International career ==
McDonald progressed up the Scotland age-grade training programmes and received her first call up in 2018 for the Scotland Women 7s team in Kazan.

McDonald was selected for the first time for Scotland Women XVs in January 2020, when she was invited to join the Scotland squad for their Test match against Spain and earned her first cap as a replacement for Jenny Maxwell when she was injured. Speaking about her role in the match, the team's coach Philip Doyle stated,"Young Mairi McDonald coming in as scrum half. What a big step up for her. The amount of work that Tyrone Holmes has done with her in the Glasgow Academy. Mairi has really come on and its through him that things have really worked well."

As Maxwell remained injured, McDonald found herself playing starting scrum half in the disrupted 2020 Women's Six Nations Championship - her first championship performance. Her coach Philip Doyle said of the decision, “It was always Mairi who was going to start this one. She showed a very composed performance against Spain off the bench which really impressed us as a coaching group." She started in the matches against Ireland, which was a defeat (18-14) and France.

In the 2021 Women's Six Nations Championship, she started in the matches against England and Italy. She was substitute for Scotland's win against Wales, in which Jenny Maxwell returned to scrum-half.

== Personal life ==
McDonald first started playing rugby in second year at Hyndland Secondary School under the guidance of her PE and History Teacher.

She is currently studying Sports Development at The University of West of Scotland.

She has trained alongside fellow Scotland player Louise McMillan since their early teens and the lock described McDonald as one of her best friends in the interview with Scotland Herald.

== Honours ==
- Sarah Beaney Cup 2016/17 winner with Hillhead Jordanhill
- Tennent's Premiership League winner 2018 with Hillhead Jordanhill
