= Evie Tonkin =

English rugby player

- Born: 5 August 1997 (age 29) Penrith, England
- Height: 1.62 m (5 ft 4 in)
- Weight: 58 kg (128 lb; 9 st 2 lb)

Rugby union career
- Position: Left wing or Full Back
Senior career
| Years | Team | Apps | (Points) |
| 2018-2021 | DMP Sharks | 35 | (15) |
| 2021- present | Sale Sharks | | |
International career
| Years | Team | Apps | (Points) |
| 2019–present | Scotland | 5 | |

Evie Tonkin (born 5 August 1997) is an English rugby player from Keswick who has played for the Scottish Women's team since 2019, and was named in the squad for the 2020 and 2021 Women's Six Nations Championship.

== Club career ==
Tonkin has played for Darlington Mowden Park Sharks since 2018. Justin Loveridge, the head of programme and co-head coach at DMP Sharks says of her abilities, "Evie has great footwork while her running lines off 13 in attack really cause teams problems and she makes good yards."

Before joining DMP Sharks she played for Harrogate.

Tonkin captained the Leeds Beckett University Women's Rugby team whilst studying for a degree in Sports and Exercise Science. In this time, she led the team to promotion into the British Universities and Colleges Sport (BUCS) Northern Premiership League.

She has signed for Sale Sharks this season.

== International career ==
Tonkin was first selected to play for Scotland Women 7s in their debut World Rugby Women's Sevens Series in Biarritz in 2019. That year, she was one of five DMP Sharks named for Scotland's autumn tests. This included playing in tests against Wales and Japan, alongside fellow debutants Evie Gallagher, Sarah Denholm and Alex Wallace.

She was included by coach Philip Doyle in the squad for the disrupted 2020 Women's Six Nations Championship. During the championship, she started for Scotland in the match against England, replacing Megan Gaffney. For the match against Ireland she was a substitute for Chloe Rollie at full-back. Doyle explained his decision, "Evie Tonkin played well at full-back in Spain, but this is such a big game and Chloe's experience will be invaluable."

In the 2021 Women's Six Nations Championship, she was also part of the squad, although did not play in the matches.

She qualifies to play for Scotland through family connections and was brought into the squad through the Scottish Qualified Programme at Scottish Rugby.

== Personal life ==
Tonkin first started playing rugby when she was 13 at Keswick Rugby Club. She studied at Leeds Beckett University to gain a PGCE in PE and Geography. A former pupil of Keswick School, she is now a PE teacher there and mentors the school's girls' rugby teams.

Tonkin studied Sports and Exercise Science BSC Hons at Leeds Beckett University where she gained a 1st in her degree.
