= Philip Doyle =

Philip Doyle may refer to:

- Philip Doyle (American football) (born 1969), American football placekicker
- Philip Doyle (rugby union coach) (1964–2026), Irish rugby union coach
- Philip Doyle (rower) (born 1992), Irish rower
