= Sarah McKenna =

England international rugby union player

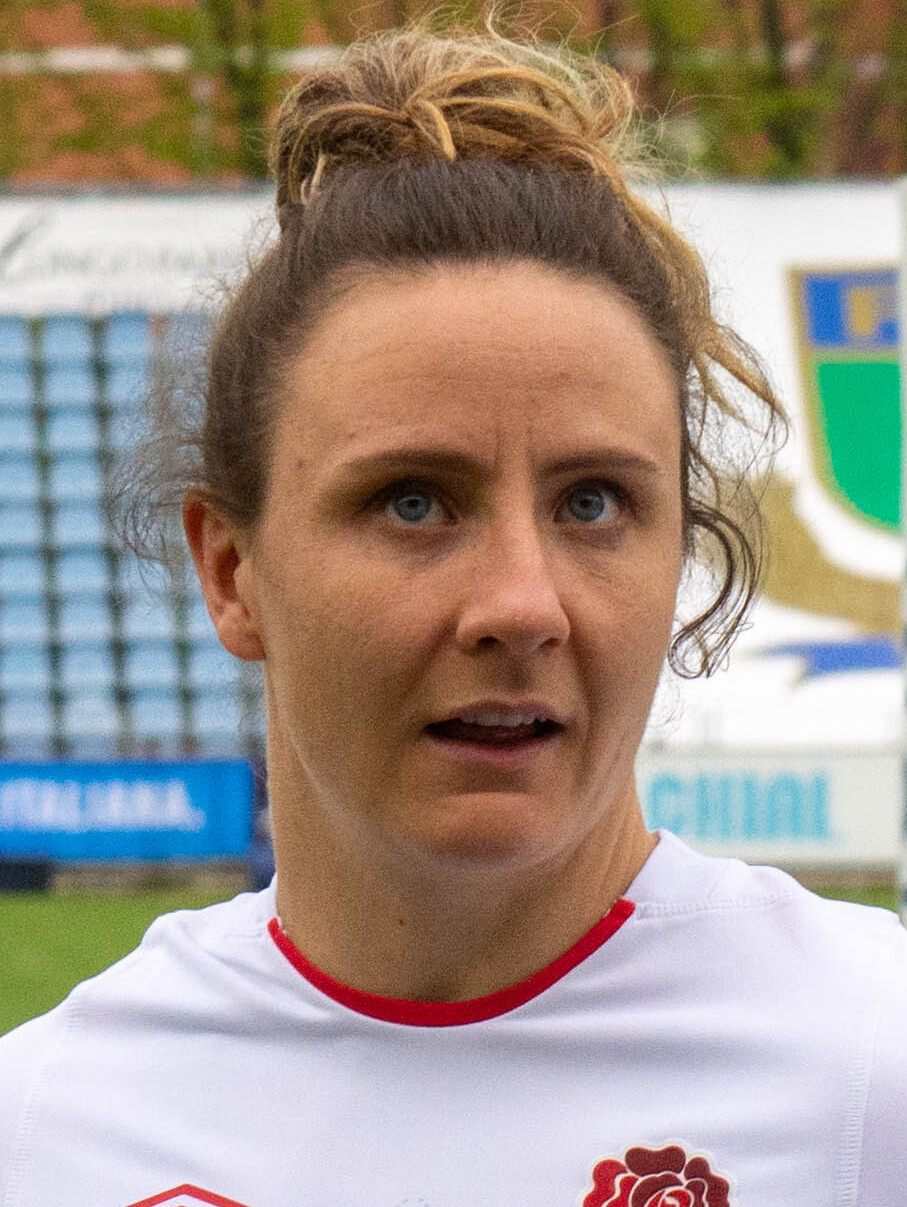
- Full name: Sarah Alison McKenna
- Born: 23 March 1989 (age 37) Harpenden, Hertfordshire, England
- Height: 1.72 m (5 ft 8 in)
- Weight: 68 kg (10 st 10 lb)

Rugby union career
Amateur team(s)
Years	Team	Apps	(Points)
2013-present	Saracens Women		
International career
Years	Team	Apps	(Points)
2011-present	England	45	(55)
National sevens team
Years	Team		Comps
2017-present	England 7s		
Medal record
Representing England
Women's rugby union
Rugby World Cup
Silver medal – second place	2021 New Zealand	Team competition

Sarah Alison McKenna (born 23 March 1989) is an English rugby union and rugby sevens player. She is a member of the England Women's Rugby Team and plays for Saracens Women's at club level.

== International career ==
McKenna made her debut for the England national team in August 2011 in a 15–11 victory over the United States. She also played for the country's rugby sevens team the same year and focused on sevens for some years after.

She played in the 2015 Women's Six Nations Championship in which England came fourth.

In 2015, she was also part of the team to finish third in the first round of the Rugby Europe 7s Grand Prix, but was forced out for nine months due to an ankle injury. The same injury caused her to miss the 2016 Summer Olympics.

She returned to international rugby in 2018, playing in three World Rugby Women's Sevens series events. She was also selected for the England squad playing in the Rugby World Cup Sevens in San Francisco that year, in which the team placed ninth.

She returned to the Women's Six Nations in 2019, starting every game at full back for England. The country won the tournament with a Grand Slam.

That same year, McKenna played for England in the Super Series in the USA. She was one of the first 28 players to be offered a full time contract by the Rugby Football Union (RFU) as they were first offered in 2019.

She continues to play for England, most recently as part of the 2020 Women's Six Nations team. She was named in the England squad for the delayed 2021 Rugby World Cup held in New Zealand in October and November 2022.

== Club career ==
She first joined Saracens Women in 2013. She was on the squad that won the Premiers title in the 2014/2015 season.

In 2018 she rejoined Saracens and was instrumental in the side again taking the Tyrells Premier 15s title in 2019.

She is Head Coach for Old Albanian RFC Saints women's rugby team based in St Albans, Hertfordshire.

== Early life and education ==
McKenna attended Grove Junior School and Roundwood Park School. She began playing rugby at the age of 6 in her hometown of Harpenden, playing at Harpenden RFC where her father coached minis rugby.

As a teenager, McKenna played netball at county level.
