= Erika Skofca =

Women's rugby union player from Italy

- Born: 4 November 1998 (age 28) Tolmezzo, Italy
- Height: 1.7 m (5 ft 7 in)
- Weight: 86 kg (190 lb)

Rugby union career
- Position: Prop
International career
Years	Team	Apps	(Points)
2020–	Italy	4	(0)

Erika Skofca (born 4 November 1998) is an Italian rugby union player. Since 2019, she plays for Valsugana, as a prop.

She played for the Italy women's national rugby union team. She competed at the 2020 Women's Six Nations Championship, and 2021 Women's Six Nations Championship.

== Life ==
She grew up in Pontebba. With her sister Jennifer, she was initially dedicated to alpine skiing.

She approached rugby in Tarvisio when, to stay in training, he started playing matches both on traditional grass and on snow, and played tournaments in Austria. In 2016, she joined the first team of the Benetton Rugby Treviso. In 2017 she moved to Oban Lorne RFC. She played in the Three-quarter back position, she won the Women's Bowl, beating Garioch RFC in the final. In 2019 she returned to Italy at Valsugana.
