= Edel McMahon =

Ireland international rugby union player

- Born: 25 March 1994 (age 32) Clare
- Height: 163 cm (5 ft 4 in)
- Weight: 69 kg (152 lb)

Rugby union career
- Position: Flanker
Amateur team(s)
| Years | Team | Apps | (Points) |
| 2012–2016 | NUIG | | (0) |
Senior career
| Years | Team | Apps | (Points) |
| 2013–2019 | Galwegians | | (0) |
| 2013–2019 | Connacht | | (0) |
| 2019–2022 | Wasps | | (0) |
| 2022– | Exeter Chiefs | | (0) |
International career
| Years | Team | Apps | (Points) |
| 2018–present | Ireland | 36 | (5) |
- Correct as of 7 September 2025
National sevens team
| Years | Team | | Comps |
- Ireland 7s

Edel McMahon (born 25 March 1994) is an Irish rugby player from Kilmihil, Co Clare. She plays for Exeter Chiefs Women, previously played for Wasps Ladies and Connacht and is a current member of the Ireland women's national rugby union team.

== Club career ==
McMahon won an All-Ireland Intermediate club title in ladies Gaelic football with her club Kilmihil in 2008 when she was aged 13, lining out in goals in a team trained by her father Tom.

A chance meeting with a rugby player when she went to study at the National University of Ireland Galway in 2012 prompted her towards rugby and, within five years, she was playing for Ireland.

Her first senior club was Galwegians RFC and she lines out for Connacht at interprovincial level. After the 2019 Women's Six Nations, prompted by Claire Molloy, she decided to move to England to get Premier 15s experience and joined Wasps.

== International career ==
McMahon was selected for the first women's Barbarians team in November 2017, before she had even played for Ireland.

She was on course to make the Ireland team for the 2017 Women's Six Nations and 2017 Women's Rugby World Cup but got an Achilles injury beforehand.

She made her Six Nations debut, as a replacement against Italy, in the 2018 Women's Six Nations when she was also a replacement against Wales and Scotland.

She made her first start for Ireland in the 2018 Autumn Internationals.

Injury curtailed her involvement in the 2019 Women's Six Nations to one appearance, as a replacement in Game 5 against Wales.

She was Ireland's regular openside flanker for the 2020 Women's Six Nations, starting against Scotland, Wales and England, winning Player of the Match against Scotland but missed the final game against Italy because of injury. In 2020 she was one of Rugby Player Ireland's nominees for Irish senior Player of the Year.

She missed Ireland's 2021 Women's Six Nations campaign due to a knee injury.

She was named in Ireland's XVs side for the 2025 Six Nations Championship in March. On 11 August 2025, she made the Irish squad to the Rugby World Cup.

== Personal life ==
McMahon, who grew up on a dairy farm in Kilmihil was a very talented ladies gaelic football player and played inter-county for Clare. She co-captained Clare to the All-Ireland minor football title and won a junior club All-Ireland with Kilmihil in 2008 and a Clare senior title in 2019.

She has also won Australian Rules Football titles in Ireland with the West Clare Waves and won two European AFL titles, in 2018–19, with Ireland's National AFL side, the Irish Banshees.

She has a degree in biochemistry from the National University of Ireland Galway and is doing a research Masters through the University of Limerick. She worked as a diagnostic laboratory scientist with O’Byrne & Halley Veterinary Clinic in Tipperary until moving to England to play professionally in 2019 where she works, part-time, for Irish medical device company Glenbio Ltd.

McMahon is fifth oldest from a family of seven and several of her siblings are also scientists. Her sister Geraldine is a top-class show-jumper who has competed in the Dublin Horse Show.

== Honours ==
- McMahon was selected to play for the first women's Barbarians Team in 2017.
