= Cyrielle Banet =

French rugby union player

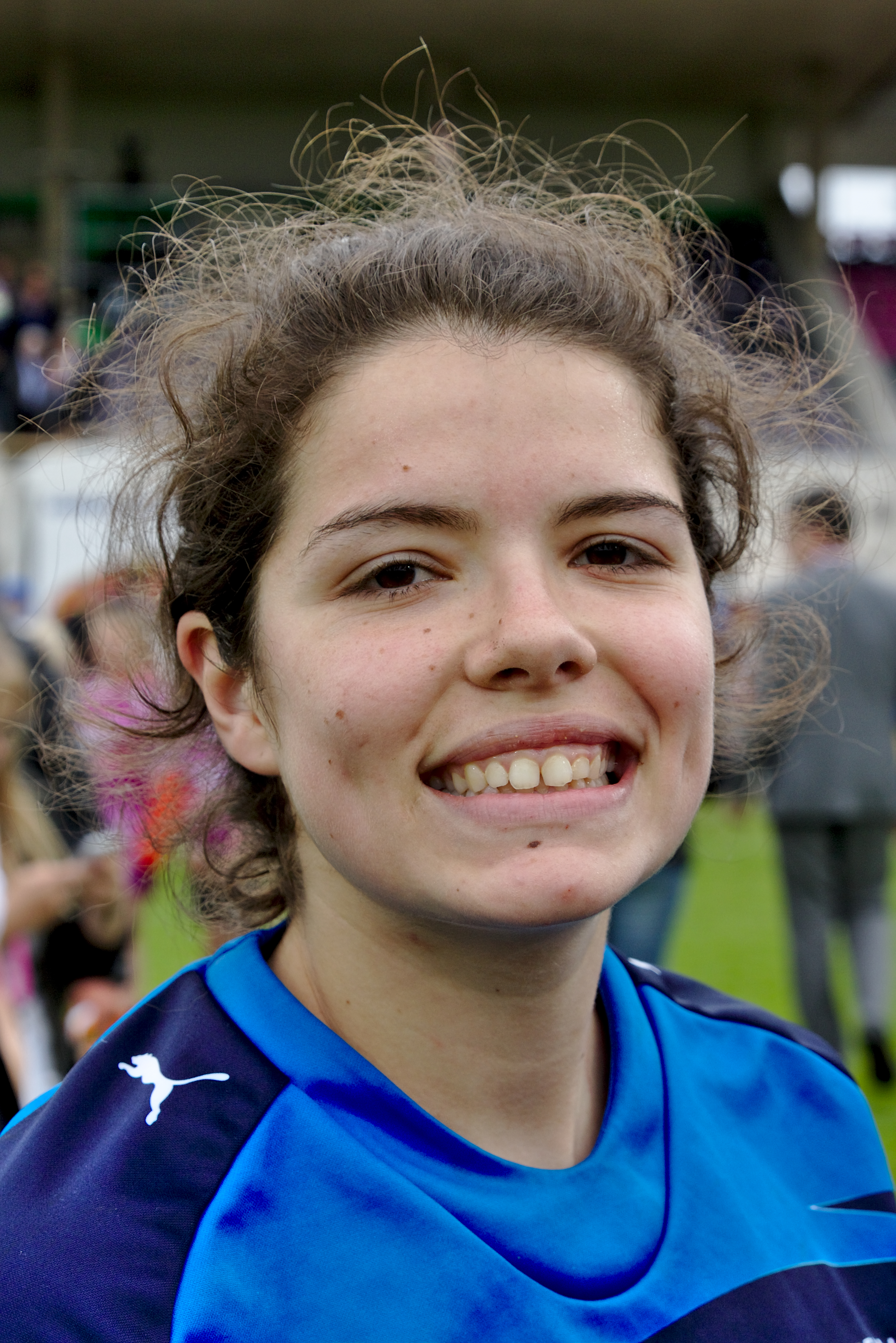
- Banet with Montpellier in 2015
- Born: 29 August 1994 (age 32)
- Height: 170 cm (5 ft 7 in)
- Weight: 60 kg (132 lb; 9 st 6 lb)

Rugby union career
- Position: Winger
Senior career
| Years | Team | Apps | (Points) |
| 2018–Present | Montpellier | | (0) |
International career
| Years | Team | Apps | (Points) |
| 2017–Present | France | 26 | (60) |

Cyrielle Banet (born 29 August 1994) is a French rugby union player. She plays at the wing for France internationally and for Montpellier at club level.

== Rugby career ==
=== 2018 ===
Banet started playing for Montpellier in 2018. She was selected for the French team for the 2018 Six Nations Championship. She scored a try each in the games against Ireland and Scotland, before scoring a brace of tries in her sides 57–0 win against Italy.

=== 2020 ===
Banet scored two tries in her sides 50–0 thrashing of Wales at the 2020 Six Nations Championship. She made a line break from inside her own 10-metre line in one of her tries and beat four defenders to cross the try line. She also scored two tries in their victory over Italy the week before.

=== 2021 ===
Banet's two tries in the 2021 Six Nations Championship helped her side defeat Ireland 56–15. She scored her first try in the first half and her second try in the second half. In November, she scored twice against the Black Ferns in her sides 38–13 win during their Autumn international.

=== 2022 ===
Banet was named in the French squad for the 2022 Six Nations Championship. She was initially named in the delayed 2021 Rugby World Cup squad but missed out due to injury.

=== 2023 ===
Banet made selection for the 2023 Six Nations Championship.
