= Molly Kelly (rugby union) =

Wales international rugby union footballer

- Born: 28 September 2000 (age 26) Bangor, Wales
- Height: 1.63 m (5 ft 4 in)
- Weight: 76.82 kg (12 st 1.4 lb)
- Occupation(s): Cable jointer, rugby player

Rugby union career
- Position: Hooker
- Current team: Sale Sharks
Senior career
Years	Team	Apps	(Points)
2020-present	Sale Sharks		
–	Firwood Waterloo		
–	RGC		
International career
Years	Team	Apps	(Points)
2019–present	Wales	6	(0)
- Correct as of 20 May 2021

Molly Kelly (born 28 September 2000) is a Welsh Rugby Union player who plays hooker for the Wales women's national rugby union team and Sale Sharks. She made her debut for the Wales national squad in 2019 and represented them at the 2021 Women's Six Nations Championship.

== Club career ==
Kelly began her rugby career in 2014, when at the age of 13 she joined Caernarfon RFC in Gwynedd, North Wales.

She then went on to captain the Rygbi Gogledd Cymru (RGC) under-18s women's team, before moving to the senior side. It was here that she was spotted by former Wales Women coach Rowland Phillips.

After moving to Liverpool in 2018 to complete a craft apprenticeship with SP Energy Networks, Kelly joined Firwood Waterloo Ladies in the Tyrrells Premier 15s league, before signing with Sale Sharks in 2020.

== International career ==
Kelly first represented Wales in the women's emerging squad during the 2018 season, and then in the 2019 Autumn Internationals.

Having just turned 18, Kelly was then selected for the Women's Six Nations team, and made her international debut in November 2019 against Scotland. She went on to appear twice more in the 2019 tournament and was selected again for the 2020 Women's Six Nations Championship, gaining caps against Ireland, France and England. She then represented Wales in the 2021 Women's Six Nation Championship, and has won five caps in her career to date.

== Personal life ==
Kelly enrolled as a craft apprentice on SP Energy Networks’ apprenticeship scheme in 2019, after taking an interest in the company that sponsored her club, RGC. The role resulted in a brief move to Liverpool, where she continued to play rugby with Firwood Waterloo Ladies. Kelly now works as a cable jointer for the energy company on the Isle of Anglesey.
