= Kathryn Dane =

- Born: 5 September 1996 (age 30) Enniskillen, County Fermanagh, Northern Ireland
- Height: 1.60 m (5 ft 3 in)
- Weight: 55 kg (121 lb; 8 st 9 lb)

Rugby union career
- Position: Scrum-half
Amateur team(s)
| Years | Team | Apps | (Points) |
| 2014-2016 | Enniskillen RFC | | |
Senior career
| Years | Team | Apps | (Points) |
| 2015 | Old Belvedere | | |
| 2015 | Ulster | | |
International career
| Years | Team | Apps | (Points) |
| 2018–present | Ireland | 14 | (0) |

Kathryn Dane (born 5 September 1996) is a rugby union player from Enniskillen, County Fermanagh, Northern Ireland. She plays scrum half for Old Belvedere and Ulster Rugby and has represented Ireland since the 2018 Women's Six Nations Championship. She works as a physiotherapist.

== Club career ==
Dane's family home is directly opposite Enniskillen Rugby Club. She took up rugby at Under-8 level but, as a lone girl, had to play with boys’ teams up to U12s.

The only rugby available to her in secondary school at Enniskillen Collegiate Grammar School was 'tag rugby' so she concentrated on soccer and also played first team hockey. She returned to rugby after being selected for Ireland's U18 Sevens squad. When she moved to Dublin for study she joined All Ireland League club Old Belvedere and was called up to the Ulster senior squad.

She has won All Ireland League medals in 2015 and 2016 and was Ulster Senior Player of the Year in 2015 and 2019.

== International career ==
Dane was first selected to train with Ireland women's rugby team in 2016. She made her Six Nations debut, as a replacement against England, in the 2019 Women's Six Nations and got her first Six Nations' start against Italy in 2019.

Dane started every game in the 2020 Women's Six Nations. In the 2021 Women's Six Nations she was again Ireland's first-choice scrum-half and started against Wales and France.

She has also represented Ireland in tag rugby.

== Coaching ==
Dane was appointed contact skills coach of Ulster Women in July 2023.

== Personal life ==
Dane was a promising soccer player, lining out at centre midfield or right back for the Northern Ireland Women's Football Association at U15, U17 and U19 level, including a qualifying series for U17 European Championships. A direct clash between playing for the NIWA U19s and going to the European Games with the Ireland U18 Sevens team saw her concentrate on rugby.

Dane is a chartered physiotherapist and a recipient of Irish Research Council Postgraduate grant in 2020. She works for FFS in Dublin and has done an internship with the Leinster Rugby Academy. In 2021 she is pursuing a PhD at Trinity College Dublin studying the specific effects of tackling on female rugby players.

In December 2022 Dane suffered a brain haemorrhage whilst training.

== Honours ==
- 2016 Ulster Rugby Women's Senior Player of the Year
- 2019 Ulster Rugby Women's Senior Player of the Year
