= Leah Lyons =

- Born: 27 November 1994 (age 31) Cork, Ireland
- Height: 1.75 m (5 ft 9 in)
- Weight: 105 kg (231 lb; 16 st 7 lb)

Rugby union career
- Position: Prop
Amateur team(s)
Years	Team	Apps	(Points)
2000-	Fermoy		
Senior career
Years	Team	Apps	(Points)
2013	Highfield		
2016	Munster		
2018-2021	Harlequins		
2021-	Sale Sharks		
International career
Years	Team	Apps	(Points)
2016–present	Ireland	29	(45)

Leah Lyons (born 27 November 1994) is an Irish rugby player from Cork. She plays prop for Sale Sharks, Munster and the Ireland women's national rugby union team. She has represented Ireland since 2016.

== Club career ==
Lyons' father Michael founded the Fermoy Lionesses and gave herself and her sister Adena scrum caps and a ball when they were just six but she started out playing in all-boys teams and didn't get to play on an all-girls' team until U13 level.

She was a ball-girl in Thomond Park when Ireland played England there in the 2007 Women's Six Nations.

She moved to Highfield RFC to play senior club rugby in 2013 and this resulted in her selection for her provincial side Munster Rugby since 2013.

She worked full-time as a coach for Munster from 2017 to 2018. That contract ended in the summer of 2018 so, in a bid to get more experience as a player, she sent out emails to several Premier 15s clubs, the top flight of English club rugby. Harlequins were first to get in touch and three days later she packed her car and headed to join the Surrey club.

In 2019 she won a Premier 15s runner-up medal with Harlequins.

She signed for Sale Sharks prior to the 2021 Premier 15s season.

== International career ==
Lyons was first selected to join the Ireland women's national rugby union team in November 2016.

She made her Ireland debut in a November 2016 Autumn International versus England, as a replacement for Cliodhna Moloney in the unfamiliar position of hooker.

She made her Six Nations debut for the Ireland women's national rugby union team in 2017 and was Ireland's top try scorer in the 2017 Women's Six Nations, dotting down against Italy, France and England.

She was selected in the Ireland squad for the 2017 Women's rugby World Cup in Dublin and a nominee for Ireland's 2017 Player of the Year.

She played all five of Ireland's games in the 2018 Women's Six Nations and scored one try. She played in three of Ireland's games in the 2019 Women's Six Nations and scored one try.

Her three appearances (against Scotland, England and Italy) in the 2020 Women's Six Nations were as a replacement.

In the 2021 Women's Six Nations she was a replacement in Ireland's third-place playoff victory over Italy.

== Personal life ==
Lyons has a twin brother and comes from Ballyhooly, the same village as Mike Ross. She studied culinary arts in Cork Institute of Technology but did not complete her degree due to a rugby injury. During the COVID-19 lockdown of 2020 she was furloughed from her job as a coach with Surrey University and, as a result, took up a job with Tesco in Guildford.

In February 2018, after her parents overheard comments about her when she had just scored a try for Ireland against Wales, Lyons spoke out publicly about the need for inclusion and body positivity in sport.

In May 2019 she was part of World Rugby's 'Try and Stop Us' campaign, revealing how rugby had helped her overcome bullying and become a role model for young rugby players.
