= Victoria Fleetwood =

England international rugby union player

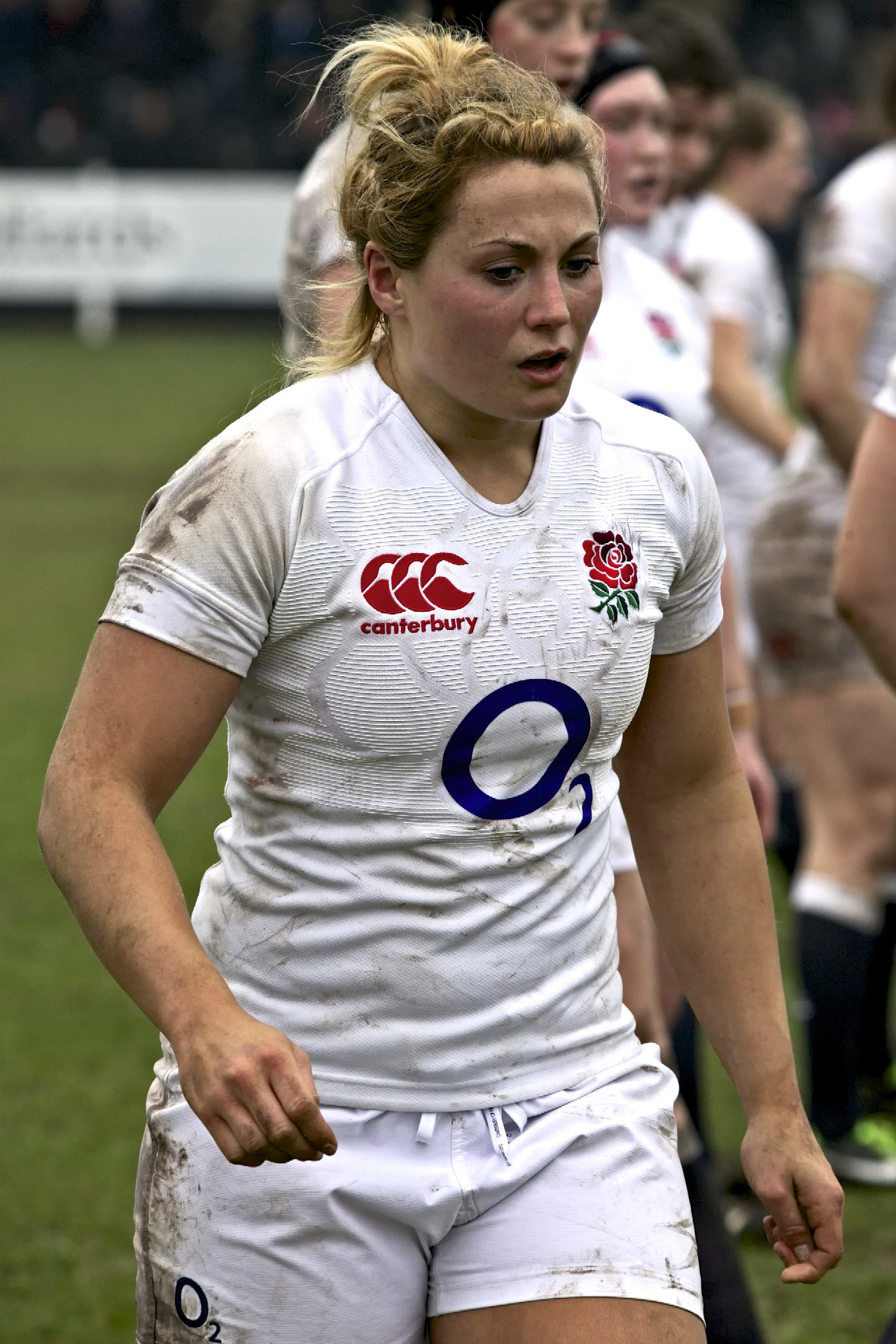
- Fleetwood in 2013
- Born: 13 April 1990 (age 36) Nuneaton, England
- Height: 1.62 m (5 ft 4 in)
- Weight: 72 kg (159 lb; 11 st 5 lb)

Rugby union career
- Position: Hooker/Back-row
Senior career
Years	Team	Apps	(Points)
2014–2023	Saracens Women		
2013	Lichfield		
International career
Years	Team	Apps	(Points)
2011–2023	England	82	(70)
Medal record
Representing England
Women's rugby union
Rugby World Cup
Gold medal – first place	2014 France	Team competition
Silver medal – second place	2017 Ireland	Team competition

Victoria Louise "Vicky" Chapman (née Fleetwood; born 13 April 1990) is a rugby union player and personal trainer. She represented England at the 2014 Women's Rugby World Cup and the 2017 Women's Rugby World Cup.

== International career ==
Fleetwood made her England debut in 2011. She made six appearances in the 2014 Women's Rugby World Cup, which England won. In 2017 she made three appearances for England at the Women's Rugby World Cup, including in the final which England lost to New Zealand.

After the 2017 World Cup, she switched to England 7s, competing for England in the 2018 Commonwealth Games; the team took the bronze medal.

Fleetwood returned to 15s in 2019 as England won the 2019 Women's Six Nations. She was injured out of the 2019 Women's Rugby Super Series, but was named Player of the Match in the Quilter International match versus Italy later that year.

Fleetwood was again part of the England team as they won the 2020 Women's Six Nations.

== Club career ==
Aged 14, Fleetwood began playing for Leicester Forest. She joined Lichfield aged 17 as part of the Under 18s squad, and later graduated to the seniors team. She continued to play for Lichfield while attending university with teammate Emily Scarratt.

She joined Saracens Women in 2014, then rejoined the team in 2020.

== Early life ==
Born in Nuneaton in 1990, Fleetwood has a twin brother named Andrew. She was a junior hurdler and sprinter before switching to rugby.

Fleetwood attended John Cleveland College and then Leeds Metropolitan University. Alongside rugby, Fleetwood is a successful personal trainer.

In 2017 she appeared on the cover of Stylist magazine as part of a feature on the England Women's Rugby team.
