= Laura Feely =

Ireland international rugby union player

- Born: 4 December 1991 (age 34) Letterkenny, Donegal, Ireland
- Height: 1.73 m (5 ft 8 in)
- Weight: 89 kg (196 lb; 14 st 0 lb)

Rugby union career
- Position: Prop
Amateur team(s)
Years	Team	Apps	(Points)
2006-2009	Letterkenny		
2009–2012	Sligo RFC		
Senior career
Years	Team	Apps	(Points)
2009-2012	Ulster		
2012–2019	Galwegians		
2013-	Connacht		
2020-	Blackrock		
International career
Years	Team	Apps	(Points)
2018–present	Ireland	19	(0)
National sevens team
Years	Team		Comps
	Ireland 7s		0

Laura Feely (born 4 December 1991) is an Irish rugby player from County Donegal. She plays prop forward for Blackrock College, Connacht and the Ireland women's national rugby union team. She works as a biomedical engineer in Dublin.

== Club career ==
Feely is from Ballybofey, Co Donegal. In her youth she specialised in athletics with Finn Valley AC and played gaelic football with local club MacCumhaills. A PE teacher in her secondary school got her interested in rugby and she started to play in Letterkenny RFC a where her brothers also played.

When she moved to study in Sligo she joined Sligo RFC and later Galwegians RFC. After moving to work in Dublin she joined All-Ireland league side Blackrock College.

She played her first provincial rugby for Ulster (2009–2012) but, after moving to Sligo to study and work in 2013, joined Connacht.

== International career ==
Feely was first called into the Ireland women's national rugby union team squad in 2017.

She was not selected in the Irish squad for the 2017 Women's Rugby World Cup and made her Ireland debut in the 2018 Women's Six Nations versus France in Toulouse.

She was Ireland's starting loosehead prop in the 2019 Women's Six Nations. She was a replacement in each of Ireland's three games in the truncated 2020 Women's Six Nations and a replacement in each of Ireland's three games in the 2021 Women's Six Nations.

== Personal life ==
Feely's first sports were athletics and gaelic football. She competed, in shot and javelin, for Finn Valley AC where her mother Christine also coached, and she won Community Games and All-Ireland juvenile medals for shot.

She is only the third woman from County Donegal to play rugby for Ireland, following in the footsteps of Nora Stapleton and Larissa Muldoon. She was in the same secondary school (St Columba's Stranorlar) and club Letterkenny RFC with Muldoon.

She has a degree in biomedical engineering from the Institute of Technology. Sligo and works for BD in Dublin.

She became obsessive about fitness and her body in her early playing career but being successful at rugby helped her to be more realistic and healthy. Her father Frank was badly injured while cycling in 2018. He recovered fully but she says his experience put sport and her life into perspective.
