= Aoife McDermott =

- Born: 4 January 1991 (age 35) Sligo, Ireland
- Height: 1.85 m (6 ft 1 in)
- Weight: 80 kg (180 lb; 12 st 8 lb)

Rugby union career
- Position: Lock Forward
Senior career
Years	Team	Apps	(Points)
2016–	Railway Union		
2017–	Leinster		

Aoife McDermott (born 4 January 1991) is an Irish rugby union player from Riverstown, Co Sligo. She plays lock forward for Railway Union RFC, Leinster and the Ireland women's national rugby union team. She is a qualified Intellectual Disability nurse and works currently in clinical research.

== Club career ==
McDermott played basketball for Ireland, from Under-16 to senior level and won a silver medal at the European Championships for Smaller Countries in 2016. Seeking a new sporting challenge she switched to rugby in 2016 and was a complete beginner when she joined Railway Union club.

Within a year of playing she was selected for Leinster and within two years she made her debut for Ireland. McDermott won interprovincial medals with Leinster in 2018 and 2019 and was part of the Railway Union team that won the club's first All-Ireland League title in 2019.

== International career ==
McDermott made her test debut for Ireland women's national rugby union team, against Wales (a late pre-match replacement for Nicola Fryday) in the 2018 Women's Six Nations and started in the remaining two games.

She has been Ireland's first choice Number 4 since, playing all five games in the 2019 Women's Six Nations.

She missed the game versus Italy in the 2020 Women's Six Nations due to a broken bone in her foot and was back to start in all three of Ireland's games in the truncated 2021 Women's Six Nations.

In the summer of 2019, to further her rugby development, she went to Australia to play with Sydney's Eastern Suburbs for four months, alongside Irish teammate Anna Caplice.

== Personal life ==
McDermott was a basketball player. She won a Division 1 championship with Sligo Allstars, won three Irish Superleagues and two National Cups with UL Huskies and was Basketball Ireland's U23 Player of the Year.

McDermott was a ‘Living For Sport’ (basketball) ambassador for Sky Sports from 2014 to 2017 in a group that included future Irish Olympic medallists Katie Taylor (boxing) and Annalise Murphy (sailing). Ireland rugby international Jenny Murphy was part of the same group and prompted her towards rugby.

She was inspired to take up nursing when Ireland hosted the Special Olympics World Games in 2003. She has a BA Nursing (Intellectual Disabilities) from the University of Limerick (2009–2013) and a Masters from Trinity College (2015–16). She is a clinical research nurse.
