= Mairi Forsyth =

Scottish rugby union player

Mairi Forsyth (born 8 July 1991) is a Scottish rugby union player. She is currently a member of the Scotland women's national rugby union team.

== Rugby career ==
She debuted for Scotland national team in 2018 against Canada, and in 2019 began playing for Corstorphine Cougars. She has played for Murrayfield Wanderers under-18s and Scotland at under-18 and 20 levels.

She was named to the 2020 Women's Six Nations team.

== Personal life ==
Forsyth is a Peterhead Academy principal teacher of maths and physics. She played at Grangemouth Rugby Club with her sister, Jemma, after previously playing at club level and academy, and receiving A caps together, though never playing together for Scotland.
