= Julie Annery =

French rugby player

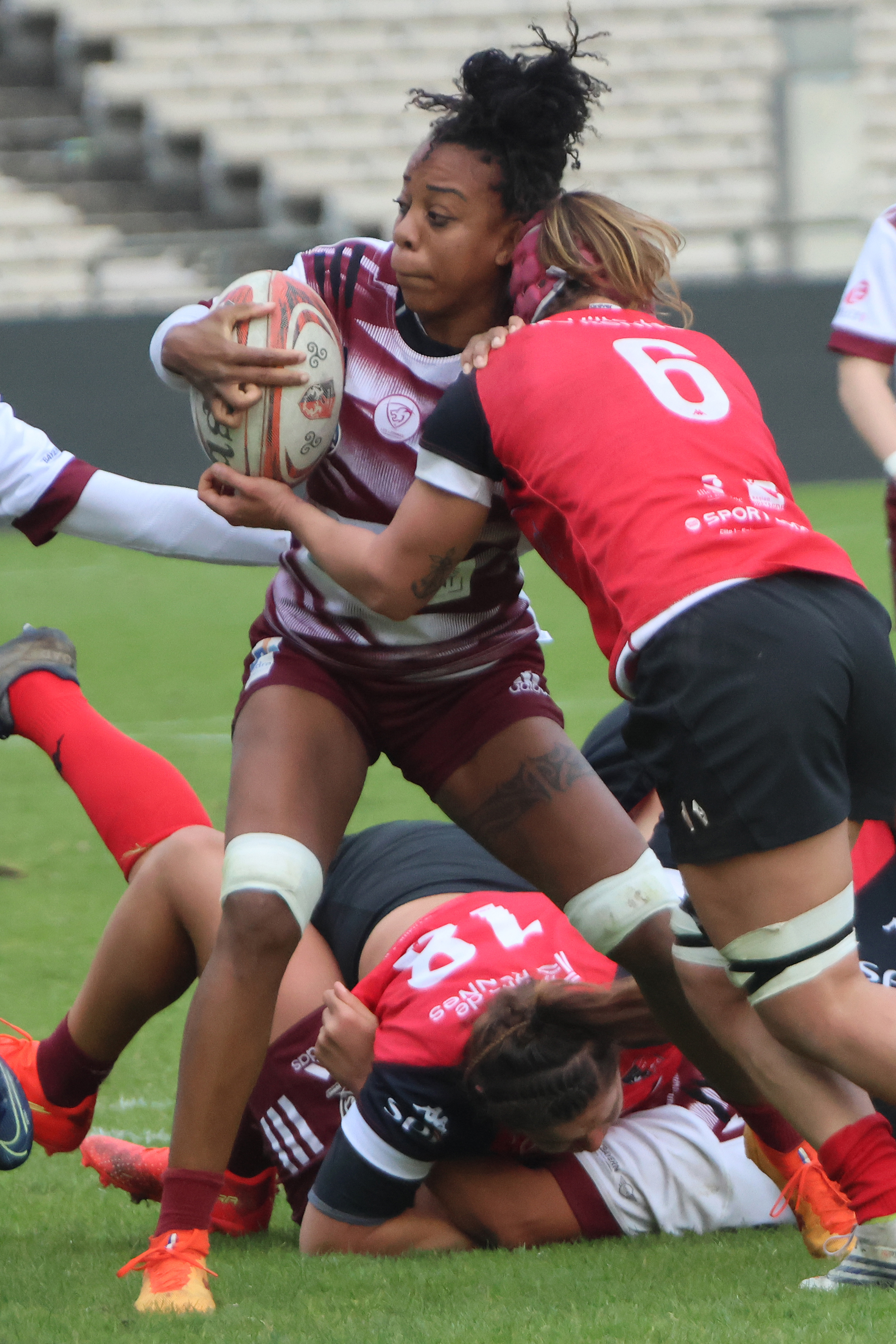
- Born: 12 June 1995 (age 31)
- Height: 171 cm (5 ft 7 in)
- Weight: 65 kg (143 lb; 10 st 3 lb)

Rugby union career
- Position: Flanker
Senior career
Years	Team	Apps	(Points)
2013–2019	AC Bobigny 93 Rugby		(0)
International career
Years	Team	Apps	(Points)
2015–Present	France	26	(0)

Julie Annery (born 12 June 1995) is a French rugby union player. She plays for the France women's national rugby union team and Stade Français.

Annery was born in Sarcelles.

== Career ==
Whilst playing for AC Bobigny 93 Rugby, who she joined aged 18, she was selected for the French squad for the 2017 World Cup.

As of September 2022, she had 26 international caps and was recognised as the fastest third line. In 2017 against England during the Women's World Cup, she was praised for her defensive solidity. She was named in France's team for the delayed 2021 Rugby World Cup in New Zealand.
