= Vickii Cornborough =

England international rugby union player

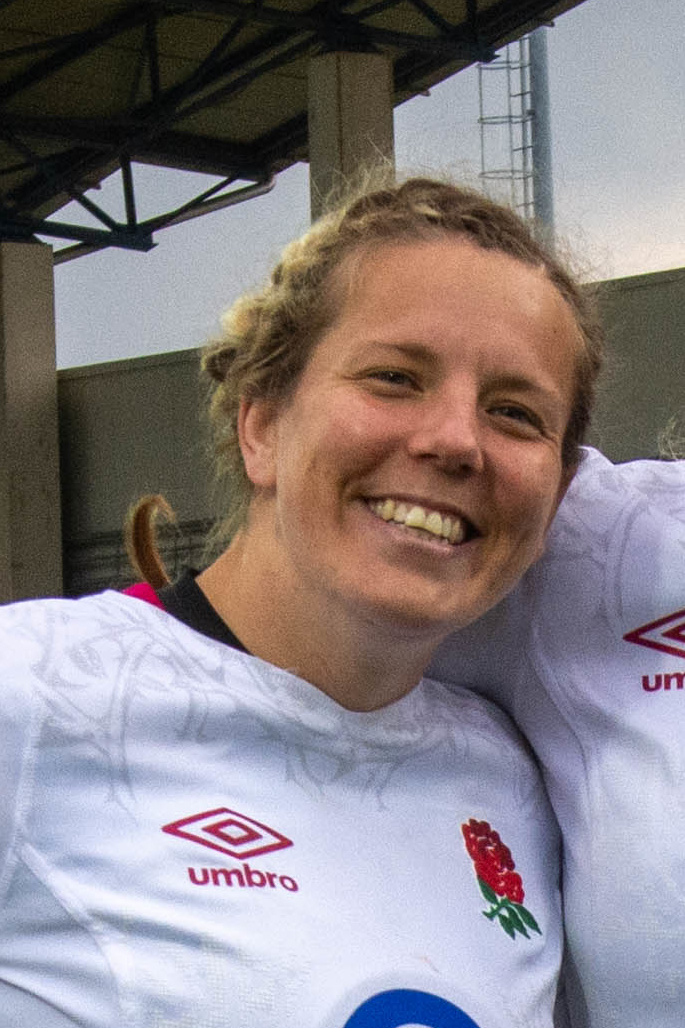
- Born: 3 March 1990 (age 36) Portsmouth, Hampshire, England
- Height: 1.68 m (5 ft 6 in)
- Weight: 78 kg (172 lb; 12 st 4 lb)

Rugby union career
- Position: Prop
- Current team: Harlequins Women
Senior career
| Years | Team | Apps | (Points) |
| 2013–2016 | Richmond | | |
| 2016–2017 | Aylesford Bulls | | |
| 2017– | Harlequins | | |
International career
| Years | Team | Apps | (Points) |
| 2015–2024 | England | 75 | (20) |
Medal record
Representing England
Women's rugby union
Rugby World Cup
| Silver medal – second place | 2021 New Zealand | Team competition |
| Silver medal – second place | 2017 Ireland | Team competition |

Victoria Moreen Cornborough (born 3 March 1990) is an English rugby union player. She debuted for England in 2015. She was named in the 2017 Women's Rugby World Cup squad for England. She was awarded a full-time contract with England in 2019 and plays for Harlequins Women at club level.

== International career ==
Cornborough first played for England in the U19s and U20s teams, winning the U20s Nations Cup in 2009 before making her international debut as part of the senior team in 2015. That year, she played nine of England's 10 test matches.

In 2017 she was named to the England team for the 2017 Women's Rugby World Cup, in which she played every game including the final which England lost to New Zealand.

Cornborough went on to play in the 2018 Six Nations and won three Quilter International matches the same year. In 2019 she was awarded a full time contract by the RFU and played in four of the six 2019 Women's Six Nations games: England won the tournament with a Grand Slam.

An injury kept her from playing in the autumn matches of the 2019–2020 season, but she gained her 50th cap for England against France during the 2020 Six Nations.

She was elected to the players' board of the Rugby Players Association (RPA) in 2017.

She was named in the England squad for the delayed 2021 Rugby World Cup held in New Zealand in October and November 2022.

== Club career ==
She began playing rugby as a child and played girls' rugby at clubs along the south coast, including Portsmouth, Havant, Petersfield and the Solent Sirens.

She joined Richmond FC as a senior in 2008 and currently plays for Harlequins Women, joining in 2016.

== Early life ==
Cornborough was born in Portsmouth and has two brothers and a sister. She learned rugby with her sister and older brother at Portsmouth RFC. She attended the University of Reading where she gained a BSc in psychology.

== Personal life ==
Cornborough's husband, Will, also plays rugby for Havant RFC. The two first met at a Minis game when they were around 10 years old.

Outside of rugby, Cornborough continues to work as an IT business development manager.
