= Panashe Muzambe =

Scotland international rugby union player

- Born: 17 November 1995 (age 30) Harare, Zimbabwe
- Height: 1.67 m (5 ft 5 1/2 in)
- Weight: 80 kg (180 lb; 12 st 8 lb)

Rugby union career
- Position: Tighthead Prop
Senior career
Years	Team	Apps	(Points)
–	Watsonians		
Provincial / State sides
Years	Team	Apps	(Points)
2023	Edinburgh Rugby Women	3	(5)
International career
Years	Team	Apps	(Points)
2019–present	Scotland	7	

Panashe Muzambe (born 17 November 1995) is a Scottish professional rugby union player. She is the first black woman to play rugby for Scotland.

== Club career ==
Muzambe took up rugby at Edinburgh Napier University and played Premiership with Watsonians RFC. Muzambe scored a try for Watsonians in their win against Hillhead Jordanhill in the final of the 2019 Tennent's Premiership. She played Back Row from 2015 to 2019, when she transitioned to Front Row.

== International career ==
Muzambe was invited to Spain in January 2019 with Scotland Women as 24th/25th player. After being part of the squad as 24th/25th player a few times, she gained a place on the Scotland bench in March 2019 for the 2019 Women's Six Nations Championship match against England at Twickenham, stepping onto the pitch for the final ten minutes of the game. Her second cap came when she was selected to travel to South Africa with Scotland Women in their first ever tour and their first ever matches in the Southern Hemisphere, where she had the chance to play in front of her extended family from the area.

It was during an East v West game in Scotland that her talent was potential for becoming a national player was spotted by the Scotland Women coach Shade Munro, who introduced himself to her after the match.

== Personal life ==
Muzambe was born in Zimbabwe, growing up in Harare and Marondera. She moved to Scotland when she was 12 years old, attending St Augustine's High School, Edinburgh, where she played basketball. Going on to Edinburgh Napier University to study for a degree in sports science, she started playing rugby there, during an introductory session led by 28-capped retired Scotland Women player Sarah Quick, who would go on to become her mentor. Her first match followed quickly after, playing against Edinburgh University 2nds. In her final year, she was also the captain of the team. She also took up refereeing in a bid to learn more about the game, obtaining her level one refereeing and coaching while studying at Edinburgh Napier University.

As well as playing for the university, she joined Watsonians ahead of the 2017/18 season. After gaining her BA, she continued studying for a master's degree in education.

Muzambe sits on the Sportscotland Young People's Sport Panel, alongside 17 other young people, influencing the future of sport in Scotland. In an interview with BBC Scotland in April 2021 she spoke of her ambition to encourage more black women to play rugby for Scotland and her ongoing admiration for tennis player Serena Williams.

== Honours ==
- Sarah Beaney Cup Winners 2018/2019
