= Emma Wassell =

Scottish rugby union player

- Born: 28 December 1994 (age 31) Aberdeen, Scotland
- Height: 1.77 m (5 ft 10 in)
- Weight: 78.3 kg (173 lb)

Rugby union career
- Position: Lock
Amateur team(s)
Years	Team	Apps	(Points)
2010	Corstorphine Cougars RFC		
Senior career
Years	Team	Apps	(Points)
2021-2025	Loughborough Lightning		
2025-	Ealing Trailfinders		
International career
Years	Team	Apps	(Points)
2014–present	Scotland	73	(30)

Emma Wassell (born 28 December 1994) is a Scottish rugby union player from Aberdeen. She made her debut for Scotland's national team in the opening Six Nations match of 2014 and has played in every subsequent national match, including the 2021 Women's Six Nations Championship.

== Club career ==
Wassell currently plays for Ealing Trailfinders in the PWR. She played for Loughborough Lightning (also PWR) prior to that, signing from her previous club, Corstorphine Cougars RFC, in 2021. Her first team was Edinburgh's Murrayfield Wanderers, who encouraged her to try for the Scotland U20 team.

== International career ==
Wassell debuted for the Scottish national team in 2014 in the opening Six Nations match against Ireland and played in every subsequent national match until April 2022, a wrist injury calling a premature end to a record-shattering streak of 54 consecutive international appearances. Wassell played a key role in the decisive 59–3 victory against Columbia in February 2022, booking Scotland's place in the Women's Rugby World Cup for the first time since 2010.

Despite scoring in the Women's Six Nations 2021 match against Italy, the team were defeated, as the visiting side triumphed with a 41–20 win.

She was a member of Scotland Women U19 7s squad in 2013, and also played in the Scotland U20 side, which beat Finland earlier that year.

In the 2017 Women's Six Nations, Scotland's defeat of Wales proved a career highlight for Wassell.

She was named in the Scottish side for the 2025 Women's Rugby World Cup in England.

== Personal life ==
Emma Clare Wassell first took up rugby at school when she was 15 and progressed through Scotland Women U18s pathway until 2012. Prior to this, she was a keen gymnast but chose to try rugby for a chance to play a team sport, when the coach of Ellon Rugby Club came to the school looking for new players. In an interview for Scottish Rugby, she describes how her father had played for the club before her, although he died before Wassell entered the sport.

She studied accountancy and finance at Edinburgh's Heriot-Watt University, giving her a chance to join her first team, Murrayfield Wanderers in Edinburgh.

She works as a full-time auditor with the firm Anderson Anderson & Brown LLP in Aberdeen. She is currently combining her rugby career with her studies for her chartered accountancy exams. In sports and regional media, she has commented on balancing a professional career in accountancy with a future in women's rugby. In an interview with The Scotsman she gave in April 2021, she describes the intensity of her schedule of balancing rugby and work.
