= Helen Nelson (rugby union) =

Scottish rugby union player (born 1994)

- Born: 24 May 1994 (age 32)
- Height: 1.74 m (5 ft 9 in)
- Weight: 77 kg (170 lb)

Rugby union career
- Position: Fly-half / Centre
- Current team: Loughborough Lightning
Senior career
Years	Team	Apps	(Points)
2012–2019	Murrayfield Wanderers		
2019–2020	Montpellier		
2020–2026	Loughborough Lightning		
2026–	Trailfinders Women		
International career
Years	Team	Apps	(Points)
2016–	Scotland	75	(236)
National sevens team
Years	Team		Comps
2019–	Scotland 7s		

Helen Nelson (born 24 May 1994) is a Scottish rugby union player who plays for Trailfinders Women and the Scotland. She played for Scotland and was captain for the team at the 2021 Women's Six Nations Championship in their winning match against Wales. She was the captain of the Scotland Rugby Union Sevens team from 2018 to 2019 and has also been a member of the Scottish Alpine Ski Team (2009–2012).

== Club career ==
Nelson is a Scottish Rugby contracted player, who is part of the Loughborough Lightning team. Before joining the club, she played for Montpellier Hérault Rugby for the 2018 season. She has also played for Barbarians FC and for the University of Edinburgh. She played for the Murrayfield Wanderers from 2012 to 2017 and was part of the Murrayfield Wanderers team that won the 2016/17 league and cup double.

She was vice captain for the Barbarians FC's first International against USA Eagles in April 2019.

Throughout her career, she has played in both fly-half and midfield positions.

== International career ==
Nelson debuted for the Scottish national team in the 2016 Women's Six Nations Championship match between Scotland and France at Broadwood Stadium. She has been a contracted player with Scottish Rugby since 2018.

She was awarded player of the match in the first Women's Rugby World Cup Qualifier against Spain at Scotstoun Stadium in November 2016. The Scottish team, which she was a part of, beat Wales in the 2017 Six Nations Championship, bringing them their first win in seven years.

In 2018, she was among the players for a match against Canada. The score was 23–26 to Canada, with Nelson kicking for a penalty.

Nelson scored eight points, one try and a penalty, in Scotland's first away Six Nations victory in the 2018 championship against Ireland. She returned to the field for the 2019 Women's Six Nations Championship, in which Scotland were defeated in all their matches.

She was named as one of eight contracted players by Scottish Rugby ahead of the 2018/19 season, joined by fellow caps Sarah Bonar, Megan Kennedy, Lisa Martin, and Lana Skeldon. The new contract saw her move from Murrayfield Wanderers to French Top 8 club, Montpellier Hérault Rugby.

Nelson was one of three Edinburgh University alumni called to play in the Scotland Women Tour of South Africa - a tour which she captained in 2019. Three teammates from Loughborough Lightning were also selected alongside Nelson.

In the 2021 Women's Six Nations Championship match against England, Nelson kicked a penalty and converted a try but the team lost 52–10 to the championship winners. She captained the 2021 Six Nations Scottish team for their match against Wales in the absence of teammate Rachel Malcolm. They went on to win the match 27–20. Nelson revealed that the Scottish team had struggled to arrange regular practices during the COVID-19 pandemic, making it a challenging year for their competitive games.

She was named in Scotland's squad for the 2025 Six Nations Championship. She was also selected in the Scottish side for the Women's Rugby World Cup.

== Personal life ==
Born in Inverness, Nelson is a professional rugby player and student assessor. She started playing rugby at seven years old at Glencoe Golden Eagles, before moving to Lochaber Ruby Club. She then took a break from the sport to become a member of the Scottish Alpine Ski Team (2009–2012).

She returned to the sport while studying Geophysics and Meteorology at Edinburgh University, playing for the university, alongside her club Murrayfield Wanderers.

In the 2021 Women's Six Nations Championship, she played against her housemate, Helena Rowland, who played for the English team. Both players are part of the Loughborough Lightning squad. Her Loughborough teammates include several English players, who won the Women's Six Nation Championship in 2021, and Nelson has spoken of how playing alongside these team members has greatly improved her game.

Nelson's aunt, Clare Hoppe played rugby for Ireland in 1993 in the first Women's international match against Scotland.

== Honours ==
- French Top 16 Champions with Montpellier Féminin in 19/20 season
- Scotland 7s Captain 2018/2019
- Player of the Match in the first Women's Rugby World Cup Qualifier against Spain, 2016
