= Louise McMillan =

Scotland women's international rugby union footballer

- Born: Louise Iona Matheson McMillan; 27 July 1997 (age 29) Glasgow, Scotland
- Height: 1.75 m (5 ft 9 in)
- Weight: 77 kg (170 lb; 12 st 2 lb)

Rugby union career
Senior career
Years	Team	Apps	(Points)
2015–2022	Hillhead Jordanhill RFC	75	
2022–	Saracens Women	40	(20)
- Correct as of 17 January 2025
Provincial / State sides
Years	Team	Apps	(Points)
2023	Glasgow Warriors Women	2	(5)
International career
Years	Team	Apps	(Points)
2016–present	Scotland	53	(5)

Louise Iona Matheson McMillan (born 27 July 1997) is a Scottish rugby player from Glasgow. She plays for Scotland and has frequently represented them in major championships since 2016, including the 2021 Women's Six Nations Championship.

== Club career ==
McMillan has played for Hillhead Jordanhill since 2015 in Back Row. She captained the team to win the Sarah Beaney Cup in 2017 and 2018. The team finished the 2018 season as Tennent's Women's Premier League Champions.

In July 2022 she signed for Saracens Women and made her debut against Loughborough Lightning on the first round of the 2022–23 Premier 15s

== International career ==
McMillan won her first Scotland cap against Spain when she started in the first Women's Rugby World Cup Qualifier at Scotstoun Stadium in November 2016. She has continued to play for the team, moving from Back Row to Second Row, which she played for the first time in 2019.

She was in Scotland Women U19 7s in 2013 and selected for the U20 squad, alongside her sister Siobhan, in 2014/15. She was in the Scotland Women 7s squad, which won the Rugby Europe Trophy in 2015 to gain promotion to the Grand Prix competition.

A low point for McMillan came in January 2019 when she broke her scapula in a match away to Spain in Madrid.

In the 2021 Women's Six Nations Championship match against England, the team lost 52–10 to the championship winners. This was her first outing as a lock for the Scottish team. They went on to take fifth place in the championship. She was "sin binned" in the match against Italy in the closing minutes for collapsing a maul that was creeping towards the line and that resulted in a penalty try. They lost the match 41-20 and went on to beat Wales. During the championship, McMillan commented on the Scottish team's improved performance from the previous year.

She is a member of the Scottish Rugby Academy and trains with the national team at Scotstoun Stadium.

In the early stages of her international career she was described by The Scotsman as "an exciting back-row prospect" in a profile of the player.

== Personal life ==
Louise Iona Matheson McMillan is a former Kilbarchan Primary School and Gryffe High School pupil, who has recently completed a law degree at the University of Glasgow and works for Morgan Stanley. Before beginning her studies, she took a year out and worked at law firm Pinsent Masons, balancing this with her rugby commitments for the Scotland under-20s squad. She completed her law studies at Glasgow during the COVID-19 pandemic and has spoken about her experience of playing international rugby while being at university, saying: "I went into halls of residence, but I was not really living the ‘freshers’ lifestyle at all, I was first to bed and first to get up - it was worth it all when I earned my first full Scotland cap against Spain though [in November 2016]."

McMillan started playing rugby at Birkmyre minis, and has previously stated that she struggled with this experience of mixed rugby, where she said the boys would not pass the ball her way. She then played for Hillhead Jordanhill U18s.

Her sister Siobhan has previously played for Scotland and several times they have played together in national matches.

Scottish rugby player Tyrone Holmes has mentored her as part of his work with the Glasgow-based players.

== Honours ==
- Winners of the Sarah Beaney Cup in 2017 and 2018
- Tennent's Women's Premier League Champions 2018
- Winners of the Rugby Europe Sevens Trophy: 2017 Rugby Europe Women's Sevens Trophy
