= Rachel Malcolm =

Scottish rugby player (born 1991)

- Full name: Rachel Ann Malcolm
- Born: 23 May 1991 (age 35) Glasgow, Scotland
- Height: 170 cm (5 ft 7 in)
- Weight: 83 kg (183 lb)
- University: Nottingham Trent University, Loughborough University
- Notable relative: James Malcolm (brother)

Rugby union career
- Position: Flanker
- Current team: Ealing Trailfinders
Senior career
Years	Team	Apps	(Points)
2015–2017	Lichfield Ladies		(0)
2017–2025	Loughborough Lightning	67	(70)
2025-	Ealing Trailfinders		
International career
Years	Team	Apps	(Points)
2016–present	Scotland	62	(15)
- Correct as of 26 September 2025

Rachel Ann Malcolm (born 23 May 1991) is a Scottish rugby union player. She plays for Ealing Trailfinders and the Scotland women's national team as a flanker.

She captained Scotland for the 2021 Women's Six Nations Championship, but she was forced to step down due to a knee injury in the team's opening game.

== Club career ==
Malcolm started playing rugby in 2015 with Lichfield Ladies. Her debut followed a game of touch-rugby in Nottingham, where a player for Lichfield Ladies spotted her talent. She was selected as captain of Loughborough Lightning for the inaugural season of England's premier club competition, Premier 15s, in the 2017–2018 season.

On 18 February 2025, it was announced that she would make her last appearance for Lightning against Ealing Trailfinders in their final match for the 2024–25 Premiership Women's Rugby season.

== International career ==
After making her Scotland debut as a replacement in Scotland's first Women's Rugby World Cup Qualifier against Spain at Scotstoun Stadium in November 2016, Malcolm's first start came in the 2017 Women's Six Nations opener against Ireland at Broadwood Stadium. During this game, she sustained an injury that meant that she missed the rest of the campaign. She has also started for Scotland at Hooker – on her starting debut in 2017 and against Japan at Scotstoun in the Autumn Test in November 2019.

She was part of the Scottish team that beat Ireland in March 2018, for the first time since the two teams first played each other. It was her penalty that saw them move 3–0 at half-time, with a final score of 15–12 to Scotland.

While developing as an international player, she experienced two concussions during 2018/19. She managed to play for Scotland in three Six Nations games in 2019, but picked up another concussion against Wales, missing the two last games of the championship.

Malcolm captained Scotland on-field on the national side's first ever summer tour, to South Africa, in 2019. She was then named captain ahead of the 2020 Six Nations.

She was part of the Scottish team that secured a landmark draw against France in the 2020 Women's Six Nations Championship. However the championship was disrupted by coronavirus, with Malcolm commenting on the team's desire to finish the championship, although its last matches were ultimately cancelled.

She was named as captain of the Scottish side for the 2021 Women's Six Nations Championship but suffered a knee injury during the first minute of the team's defeat to England, causing her to step down for the rest of the championship.

Malcolm led Scotland for the 2025 Six Nations Championship. She subsequently made the Scottish side to the Women's Rugby World Cup in England.

== Playing style ==
Malcolm is a modern back row player, known for her work-rate about the pitch on both sides of the ball. In her rugby career, she has played in a variety of positions, including hooker and back-row for Scotland.

== Education ==
Malcolm completed her PhD in environmental physiology at Nottingham Trent University. She studied part-time while both playing rugby and lecturing at Nottingham Trent University. She also has a sports and exercise science bachelor's degree, and a master's degree in exercise physiology from Loughborough University.

Since completing her PhD, Malcolm has been working as an Applied Sport Science lecturer at Nottingham Trent University, as well as continuing her research and playing at the highest level of club and international rugby.

== Other sports ==
Malcolm represented Scotland in hockey at U17, U18 and U21 levels.

== Personal life ==
Malcolm's younger brother James is also a rugby player. He was signed to Seattle Seawolves for the 2021 USMLR season. He previously represented Glasgow Warriors and London Scottish. The siblings' older brother Donald Malcolm is a former Scotland U19 player and their father Walter Malcolm also played district rugby.
