= Megan Gaffney =

Scotland international rugby union player

- Born: 3 December 1991 (age 34) Edinburgh, Scotland
- Height: 1.69 m (5 ft 6 1/2 in)
- Weight: 70 kg (150 lb; 11 st 0 lb)

Rugby union career
- Position: Winger
Senior career
Years	Team	Apps	(Points)
2019-2020	Watsonians		
2020-present	Heriot's Blues Women		
International career
Years	Team	Apps	(Points)
2011–2022	Scotland	45	(0)

Megan Gaffney (born 3 December 1991) is a former Scottish rugby union player. She is from Edinburgh and has competed internationally for Scotland since 2011. She has twice been selected for the Great Britain 7s training squad for the Rio and Tokyo Olympics. She retired from international rugby at the end of 2022.

== Club career ==
In 2020 Gaffney began to play for Heriots RFC. Before this, she played for the Watsonians. In an interview with East Lothian Courier, she commented on her move: “It is a really forward-thinking club. I know a lot of the players there and I have watched the team progress.”

Before joining the Watsonians, she had also played for Murrayfield Wanderers and Hillhead Jordanhill. She scored the winning try in the last minute for Hillhead Jordanhill in the 2013 Sarah Beaney Cup Final at Murrayfield against RHC Cougars.

Gaffney was in the Edinburgh University Women’s squad, which won three BUCS titles in 2016/17.

== International career ==
Gaffney has played for Scotland within the under-18, Scotland under-20, Scotland Women and Scotland Women 7s.

=== Fifteens ===
Gaffney made her international debut off the bench for women's XVs against the Netherlands in Amsterdam in November 2011. She secured her first start against England at Esher in the 2013 Women's Six Nations opener.

In 2014, She scored her first points for Scotland against the Netherlands, running in two of the five tries in the FIRA WRWC qualifier win. In 2017, she spent a year travelling in Australia and New Zealand, during which she played for the Manawatū Cyclones.

Gaffney was part of the 2021 Women's Six Nations Championship team and played in the team's defeat to England and Italy ahead of their closing game against Wales, which they went on to win. Ahead of the match with Wales she told the BBC, "A win would be amazing. There's that saying, 'sometimes you win and sometimes you learn'. I feel like I've learned everything I need to know, I would like to win now." During the match she scored the team's first try. She was also part of the 2020 Women's Six Nations Championship, which was disrupted by COVID-19.

Gaffney retired from international rugby after the delayed 2021 Rugby World Cup in New Zealand.

=== Sevens ===
In 2012, she was selected to play for the Great Britain women's sevens team at the World Student Games 7s in Brive in July 2012.

Gaffney played in all four tournaments during the debut Scotland Women 7s season in 2012, scoring a try against France in Amsterdam, three tries at Rugby Rocks London, two tries at the FIRA-AER European qualifier in Ghent and two tries at the FIRA WRWC qualifier in Moscow. In the FIRA Grand Prix Series in 2013, she scored against Italy (Brive) and Germany (Marbella).

In 2016, she was included in the initial Great Britain Olympic training squad for Rio 2016. In 2017, she scored a try against Romania in the Europe Women’s Sevens Trophy, helping the team to victory in the overall championship.

In 2020, she was one of six female Scottish rugby players selected for the Team GB Sevens training squad for the postponed Tokyo 2020 Olympics. The GB Sevens team made headlines by putting Great Britain's men's and women's Olympic Sevens squads on equal pay.

== Personal life ==
Gaffney is a former North Berwick High School pupil, who began playing rugby aged seven for the North Berwick RFC Minis. At 15, she joined her high school team.

Outside of rugby, she represented Scottish Schools in under-17 athletics.

While completing her Masters in Sports Policy, Management and International Development at the University of Edinburgh, she played for the University team.

The 28-year-old works for the School of Hard Knocks, which delivers rugby, boxing and strongman courses across the UK, supported by a curriculum of powerful life lessons.

In 2020, she was selected from the women's Scottish team to model the homekit for Scotland's new season.

== Honours ==
- Winner of World Student Games 7s 2012 with Team GB
- Winner of 2013 Sarah Beaney Cup Final with Hillhead Jordanhill
- Winner of the BUCS Championship final with University of Edinburgh 2016/17
- Winner of the 2017 Rugby Europe Women’s 7s trophy
- Winner of Scotland Women 7s Rugby Europe Women’s Sevens Trophy 2017
