= Philip Doyle (rugby union coach) =

Irish rugby union coach (1964–2026)

- Born: 1 November 1964
- Died: 25 June 2026 (aged 61)

Rugby union career
Senior career
Years	Team	Apps	(Points)
- Blackrock College
Coaching career
- Years: Team
- 1998–2000: Leinster Women's
- 2003–2006: Ireland Women's
- 2009–2010: Leinster Women's
- 2010–2015: Ireland Women's
- 2019–2020: Scotland Women's
- DLSP
- Blackrock College
- Bective Rangers

Philip Doyle (1 November 1964 – 25 June 2026) was an Irish rugby union coach. He was the head coach of the Irish Women's national team and the Scotland women's national team.

== Coaching career ==
Doyle first coached the women's national team from 2003 to 2006. He was reinstated as head coach in 2010 and led them to Grand Slam victory in the 2013 Women's Six Nations Championship.

He also created history when the Irish women defeated New Zealand at the 2014 Women's Rugby World Cup in France. He resigned as head coach after the 2014 World Cup.

In 2019 he became head coach of the Scotland women's national team. He resigned in August 2020 because he needed to shield, due to the United Kingdom's COVID–19 rules.

== Death ==
Doyle died on 25 June 2026, at the age of 61.
