= List of Scotland women's national rugby union players =

This article represents a list of people who have played for the Scotland women's national rugby union team, in the order that they received their first cap. The list only includes players who have played in an official test match.

Scotland's international rugby capped players
No.	Name	Position	Date of first cap	Opposition
1	Catriona Binnie		14 February 1993	Ireland
2	Alison Brand		14 February 1993	Ireland
3	Sue Brodie		14 February 1993	Ireland
4	Micky Cave		14 February 1993	Ireland
5	Lee Cockburn		14 February 1993	Ireland
6	Sandra Colamartino		14 February 1993	Ireland
7	Debbie Francis		14 February 1993	Ireland
8	Anny (da Silva) Freitas		14 February 1993	Ireland
9	Lynn Gatherer		14 February 1993	Ireland
10	Donna Kennedy		14 February 1993	Ireland
11	Kim Littlejohn		14 February 1993	Ireland
12	Ali Mackenzie		14 February 1993	Ireland
13	Ali McGrandles		14 February 1993	Ireland
14	Brenda Robinson		14 February 1993	Ireland
15	Julie Taylor		14 February 1993	Ireland
16	Donna Aitken		19 December 1993	Wales
17	Dawn Barnett		19 December 1993	Wales
18	Pogo Paterson		19 December 1993	Wales
19	Jennifer Sheerin		19 December 1993	Wales
20	Ali Christie		13 February 1994	Ireland
21	Elaine Black		13 April 1994	Russia
22	Irene Wilson		13 April 1994	Russia
23	Linzi Burns		15 April 1994	England
24	Iona Fergusson		15 April 1994	England
25	Debbie Lochhead		15 April 1994	England
26	Mags McHardy		15 April 1994	England
27	Heather Lawrie		15 April 1994	England
28	Susan Grant		15 April 1994	England
29	Shiona McLeod		20 April 1994	Ireland
30	Kath Vass		20 April 1994	Ireland
31	Gill Cameron		20 April 1994	Ireland
32	Kim Craigie		24 April 1994	Sweden
33	Ann Lawson		24 April 1994	Sweden
34	Lisa O’Keefe		18 December 1994	Wales
35	Helen Craig		23 September 1995	Netherlands
36	Sarah Higgins		21 January 1996	Ireland
37	Clare Muir		21 January 1996	Ireland
38	Janyne Afseth		18 February 1996	Wales
39	Rimma Petlevannaya		18 February 1996	Wales
40	Karen Findlay		30 November 1996	Netherlands
41	Lynn Grant		30 November 1996	Netherlands
42	Sheila Scott		30 November 1996	Netherlands
43	Paula Chalmers		12 January 1997	Wales
44	Denise Fairbairn		23 February 1997	Ireland
45	Beth Macleod		23 February 1997	Ireland
46	Claire Herriot		5 August 1997	Sweden
47	Shirley Gray		5 August 1997	Sweden
48	Liz Allsopp		8 February 1998	Ireland
49	Louise Blamire		21 February 1998	France
50	Hayley Bird		5 December 1998	Spain
51	Lisa Hill		5 December 1998	Spain
52	Alix Shepherd		5 December 1998	Spain
53	Victoria Galbraith		7 February 1999	Wales
54	Megan Osborne		7 February 1999	Wales
55	Ruth Cranston		7 February 1999	Wales
56	Sam Lee		7 February 1999	Wales
57	Rhona Shepherd		7 February 1999	Wales
58	Victoria Wiseman		7 February 1999	Wales
59	Gill Gibbon		7 February 1999	Wales
60	Susan Anema		9 April 1999	France
61	Angela Hutt		9 April 1999	France
62	Maggie-Ann Hodge		9 April 1999	France
63	Ally Little		19 February 2000	Spain
64	Lorna Murray		19 February 2000	Spain
65	Jen Dickson		8 May 2000	Wales
66	Fiona Gillanders		8 May 2000	Wales
67	Jen Hanley		13 May 2000	England
68	Joan Hutchison		13 May 2000	England
69	Pippa Dobson		3 February 2001	France
70	Sharon Millar		3 February 2001	France
71	Mary Pat Tierney		3 February 2001	France
72	Claire Cruikshank		18 February 2001	Wales
73	Kirsty MacDonald		18 February 2001	Wales
74	Niki McDonald		18 March 2001	Spain
75	Iona Frickleton		11 November 2001	Sweden
76	Cath Lane		11 November 2001	Sweden
77	Ali Newall		11 November 2001	Sweden
78	Laura Webb		11 November 2001	Sweden
79	Ainsley Rawlings		11 November 2001	Sweden
80	Sharon Brodie		24 November 2002	Sweden
81	Melanie Christie		24 November 2002	Sweden
82	Sara Mears		24 November 2002	Sweden
83	Jill Baird		24 November 2002	Sweden
84	Haley Campbell		24 November 2002	Sweden
85	Beth Dickens		24 November 2002	Sweden
86	Veronica Fitzpatrick		15 February 2003	Ireland
87	Carla Di Rollo		15 February 2003	Ireland
88	Elaine Nicol		15 February 2003	Ireland
89	Lucy Millard		22 February 2003	France
90	Kirsty Tonge		22 March 2003	England
91	Hazel Tod		29 March 2003	Spain
92	Louise Dalgliesh		6 July 2003	Sweden
93	Lindsay Wheeler		6 July 2003	Sweden
94	Sandra Bell		6 July 2003	Sweden
95	Katie Davies		6 July 2003	Sweden
96	Shona Watt		14 February 2004	Wales
97	Lynne Reid		14 February 2004	Wales
98	Chris Ovenden		6 March 2004	Spain
99	Jilly McCord		2 May 2004	Sweden
100	Gayle Stewart		2 May 2004	Sweden
101	Kate Wilkinson		2 May 2004	Sweden
102	Susie Brown		27 November 2004	United States
103	Heather Lockhart		27 November 2004	United States
104	Suzi Newton		27 November 2004	United States
105	Erin Kerr		4 February 2005	France
106	Sarah Mee		4 February 2005	France
107	Gail Russell		4 February 2005	France
108	Emma Evans		26 February 2005	Spain
109	Louise Fraser		2 July 2005	Canada
110	Lynsey Douglas		21 January 2006	United States
111	Rachael Nicolson		17 September 2006	United States
112	Cara D’Silva		3 February 2007	England
113	Tanya Griffith		3 February 2007	England
114	Donna McGrellis		3 February 2007	England
115	Louise Moffat		3 February 2007	England
116	Anna Panayotopoulos		3 February 2007	England
117	Lana Blyth		3 February 2007	England
118	Sonia Cull		3 February 2007	England
119	Sarah-Louise Walker		3 February 2007	England
120	Lynsey Harley		24 February 2007	Italy
121	Hazel Bielinski		10 March 2007	Ireland
122	Victoria Blakebrough		4 November 2007	Canada
123	Laura Steven		4 November 2007	Canada
124	Alison Macdonald		4 November 2007	Canada
125	Ellen Beattie		4 November 2007	Canada
126	Sarah Gill		4 November 2007	Canada
127	Alex Pratt		3 February 2008	France
128	Mary Lafaiki		3 February 2008	France
129	Keri Holdsworth		22 February 2008	Ireland
130	Julie Sanaghan		8 March 2008	England
131	Ruth Slaven		17 May 2008	Wales
132	Joy Lyth		10 January 2009	Sweden
133	Natalya Macholla		10 January 2009	Sweden
134	Nikki McLeod		15 February 2009	France
135	Katy Green		15 February 2009	France
136	Sarah Quick		17 May 2009	Russia
137	Roz Murphy		20 May 2009	Belgium
138	Celia Hawthorn		6 February 2010	France
139	Louise Gray		14 February 2010	Wales
140	Steph Johnston		28 February 2010	Italy
141	Nicola Halfpenny		19 March 2010	Ireland
142	Michelle Napier		5 June 2010	South Africa
143	Tess Forsberg		1 September 2010	Canada
144	Lisa Martin		5 September 2010	Ireland
145	Caroline Collie		3 January 2011	Spain
146	Lauren Harris		3 January 2011	Spain
147	Charlie Lewis		3 January 2011	Spain
148	Anna Swan		3 January 2011	Spain
149	Tracy Balmer		3 January 2011	Spain
150	Jenny Johnston		3 January 2011	Spain
151	Suzanne McKerlie-Hex		3 January 2011	Spain
152	Lisa Ritchie		3 January 2011	Spain
153	Lindsey Smith		3 January 2011	Spain
154	Katherine Muir		4 February 2011	France
155	Annabel Sergeant		4 February 2011	France
156	Charlie Veale		4 February 2011	France
157	Jemma Forsyth		13 February 2011	Wales
158	Sarah Dixon		6 November 2011	Netherlands
159	Sarah Sexton		6 November 2011	Netherlands
160	Lana Skeldon		6 November 2011	Netherlands
161	Megan Gaffney		6 November 2011	Netherlands
162	Bridget Millar-Mills		2 February 2013	England
163	Becca Parker		2 February 2013	England
164	Sarah Law		2 February 2013	England
165	Jade Konkel		2 February 2013	England
166	Leanne Neary		2 February 2013	England
167	Kelly Shields		23 February 2013	Ireland
168	Lyndsay O’Donnell		15 March 2013	France
169	Hannah Smith		15 March 2013	France
170	Gillian Inglis		20 April 2013	Netherlands
171	Samantha Beal		20 April 2013	Netherlands
172	Deborah McCormack		31 January 2014	Ireland
173	Emma Wassell	Lock	31 January 2014	Ireland
174	Lisa Robertson		31 January 2014	Ireland
175	Anna Stodter		31 January 2014	Ireland
176	Rachael Cook		9 February 2014	England
177	Emily Irving		23 February 2014	Italy
178	Karen Dunbar		23 February 2014	Italy
179	Sarah Smith		9 March 2014	France
180	Mhairi Grieve		23 November 2014	Italy
181	Hannah Sloan		23 November 2014	Italy
182	Christianne Fahey		23 November 2014	Italy
183	Eilidh Sinclair		23 November 2014	Italy
184	Claire Bain		23 November 2014	Italy
185	Hatty Cumber		23 November 2014	Italy
186	Nuala Deans		7 February 2015	France
187	Abi Evans		7 February 2015	France
188	Jenny Maxwell		7 February 2015	France
189	Chloe Rollie		7 February 2015	France
190	Katie Dougan		1 March 2015	Italy
191	Fiona Sim		13 March 2015	England
192	Rhona Lloyd	Wing	5 February 2016	England
193	Lisa Thomson	Centre	5 February 2016	England
194	Debbie Falconer		5 February 2016	England
195	Helen Nelson		11 March 2016	France
196	Louise McMillan	Lock	18 November 2016	Spain
197	Rachel Malcolm		18 November 2016	Spain
198	Sarah Bonar		18 November 2016	Spain
199	Lucy Park		26 November 2016	Spain
200	Megan Kennedy		2 February 2018	Wales
201	Liz Musgrove		2 February 2018	Wales
202	Siobhan McMillan		2 February 2018	Wales
203	Jodie Rettie		2 February 2018	Wales
204	Siobhan Cattigan		2 February 2018	Wales
205	Nicola Howat		10 February 2018	France
206	Mags Lowish		10 February 2018	France
207	Lisa Cockburn		4 November 2018	Italy
208	Rachel McLachlan		4 November 2018	Italy
209	Lucy Winter		4 November 2018	Italy
210	Bryony Nelson		27 November 2018	Canada
211	Mairi Forsyth		27 November 2018	Canada
212	Sophie Anderson		20 January 2019	Spain
213	Panashe Muzambe		16 March 2019	England
214	Christine Belisle		30 September 2019	South Africa
215	Sarah Denholm		17 November 2019	Wales
216	Evie Tonkin		17 November 2019	Wales
217	Leah Bartlett		19 January 2020	Spain
218	Mairi McDonald	Scrum-half	19 January 2020	Spain
219	Molly Wright		19 January 2020	Spain
220	Alex Wallace		19 January 2020	Spain
221	Rachel Shankland		25 October 2020	France
222	Evie Gallagher		3 April 2021	England
223	Evie Wills		17 April 2021	Italy
224	Coreen Grant	Wing	17 April 2021	Italy
225	Anne Young		14 November 2021	Japan
226	Shona Campbell		14 November 2021	Japan
227	Caity Mattinson		25 February 2022	Colombia
228	Eva Donaldson		25 February 2022	Colombia
229	Meryl Smith	Fullback	26 March 2022	England
230	Emma Orr		2 April 2022	Wales
231	Elliann Clarke		27 August 2022	United States
232	Elis Martin		27 August 2022	United States
233	Francesca McGhie	Winger	25 March 2023	England
234	Beth Blacklock	Centre	25 March 2023	England
235			2023	
236	Alex Stewart	Back-Row	23 March 2024	Wales
237	Fiona McIntosh	Lock	13 April 2024	England
238			2024	
239	Leia Brebner-Holden	Scrum-Half	6 September 2024	Wales
240	Lucia Scott	Fullback	6 September 2024	Wales
241	Hollie Cunningham	Lock	22 March 2025	Wales
242	Adelle Ferrie	Lock	22 March 2025	Wales
243	Molly Poolman	Prop	29 March 2025	France
244	Becky Boyd	Lock	29 March 2025	France
245	Rhea Clarke	Scrum-Half	19 April 2025	England
246	Rachel Philipps	Centre	19 April 2025	England
247	Gemma Bell	Flanker	19 April 2025	England
248	Hannah Ramsay	Stand-Off	25 July 2025	Italy
249	Emily Couborough	No 8	11 April 2026	Wales
250	Demi Swann	Loosehead	11 April 2026	Wales
251	Holland Bogan	Flanker	11 April 2026	Wales
252	Rianna Darroch	Scrum-Half	18 April 2026	England
253	Aisha Sutcliffe	Hooker	9 May 2026	France

== Sources ==
- Scottish Rugby – Women's Roll of Honour
