= List of 2025–26 Premiership Women's Rugby transfers =

This is a list of player transfers involving Premiership Women's Rugby teams before or during the 2025–26 season.

The list consists of permanent player movements or temporary loan deals that have been officially confirmed, and are either to or from one of the nine teams competing in Premiership Women's Rugby in 2024–25. It is not unknown for confirmed transfers to be cancelled at a later date.

== Bristol Bears ==
=== Players in ===
- (Scotland) Rhea Clarke from (Scotland) Edinburgh
- (Wales) Maisie Davies from (Wales) Gwalia Lightning
- (Wales) Gwennan Hopkins from (England) Gloucester–Hartpury
- (Wales) Natalia John from (England) Saracens
- (New Zealand) Ruahei Demant from (New Zealand) Blues (short-term deal)
- (Canada) Pamphinette Buisa from (Canada) Ottawa Irish (short-term deal)
- Chloe Daniels from Canada 7s
- (England) Millie Hyett from (England) Gloucester–Hartpury

=== Players out ===
- (United States) Ilona Maher (released)
- (England) Amber Reed (retired)
- (England) Gabriella Nigrelli to (England) Exeter Chiefs
- (England) Lucy Burgess from (England) Harlequins
- (Wales) Courtney Keight to (England) Sale Sharks
- (England) Holly Aitchison to (England) Sale Sharks
- (England) Ellie Marston-Mulhearn (retired)
- (England) Helene Caux (released)
- (England) Deborah Wills to (England) Saracens

== Exeter Chiefs ==
=== Players in ===
- (England) Gabriella Nigrelli from (England) Bristol Bears
- (Spain) Sofia Bekir Fuente from (Spain) CRAT A Coruña
- (England) Lola Whitley from (England) Gloucester–Hartpury
- (Italy) Francesca Granzotto from (Italy) Unione Rugby Capitolina
- (New Zealand) Amy Rule from (New Zealand) Matatū
- (England) Zoe Dare from (England) Gloucester–Hartpury
- (Wales) Eleanor Hing from (Wales) Cardiff University
- (Wales) Hannah Bluck from (Wales) Brython Thunder
- (England) Maddie Flutey from (New Zealand) Otago Spirit
- (Canada) Abigail Duguid from (England) Loughborough Lightning
- (England) Ellen Scantlebury from (England) Loughborough Lightning
- (England) Eleanor Febrey from (New Zealand) Manawatū Cyclones

=== Players out ===
- (United States) Rachel Johnson to (United States) Denver Onyx
- (Canada) Stef Evans (retired)
- (England) Poppy Leitch (retired)
- (England) Flo Long to (England) Trailfinders
- (England) Ebony Jefferies (retired)
- (Australia) Lori Cramer (released)
- (New Zealand) Zara Feaunati (released)
- (United States) Charli Jacoby (released)
- (Japan) Kanako Kobayashi (released)
- (Scotland) Mairi McDonald (released)
- (Canada) Taylor Perry (released)
- (Canada) Sabrina Poulin (released)
- (England) Millie Whitehouse (released)
- (Canada) Mikiela Nelson to (England) Trailfinders
- (Ireland) Clara Nielson (released)
- (England) Niamh Orchard to Hong Kong FC
- (England) Georgina Tasker to Hong Kong FC
- (England) Ellie Cunningham to (England) Saracens

== Gloucester–Hartpury ==
=== Players in ===
- (Wales) Alaw Pyrs from (Wales) Gwalia Lightning
- (Ireland) Niamh O'Dowd from (Ireland) Wolfhounds

=== Players out ===
- (Ireland) Kathryn Buggy (retired)
- (England) Beth Stafford (retired)
- (Wales) Carys Williams-Morris (released)
- (England) Charlotte Woodman (released)
- (England) Sophie Tandy (released)
- (England) Lola Whitley to (England) Exeter Chiefs
- (England) Abileigh Priestnall to (England) Leicester Tigers
- (England) Zoe Dare to (England) Exeter Chiefs
- (Scotland) Lucia Scott to (England) Loughborough Lightning
- (Spain) Carmen Castellucci to (England) Sale Sharks
- (Canada) Gillian Boag to (Canada) Capilano
- (Wales) Gwennan Hopkins to (England) Bristol Bears
- (Scotland) Lisa Cockburn (retired)
- (Wales) Gwen Crabb to (Wales) Brython Thunder
- (England) Millie Hyett to (England) Bristol Bears

== Harlequins ==
=== Players in ===
- (England) Megan Barwick from (England) Trailfinders
- (England) Sophie Tansley from (England) Saracens
- (Scotland) Natasha Logan from (Scotland) Edinburgh University
- (Scotland) Fiona McIntosh from (England) Saracens
- (England) Lucy Burgess from (England) Bristol Bears
- (Scotland) Coreen Grant from (England) Saracens
- (Ireland) Aoife Wafer from (Ireland) Leinster
- (Fiji) Manuqalo Komaitai from (United Kingdom) British Army
- (New Zealand) Liana Mikaele-Tu'u from (New Zealand) Blues (short-term deal)
- (New Zealand) Layla Sae from (New Zealand) Hurricanes Poua (short-term deal)

=== Players out ===
- (England) Harriet Millar-Mills (retired)
- (South Africa) Babalwa Latsha (released)
- (England) Bee Leonard (released)
- (England) Chloe Benjamin (released)
- (England) Emma Blackburn (released)
- (England) Florence Neller (released)
- (Wales) Freya Bell (released)
- (Netherlands) Isa Prins (released)
- (England) Kirsty Hillier (released)
- (England) Lucy Heryet (released)
- (England) Rebecca Grogut (released)
- (England) Jemima Moss to (England) Saracens
- (Australia) Kaitlan Leaney to (Australia) NSW Waratahs
- (Canada) Maddy Grant (released)
- (England) Lauren Poole to (England) Leicester Tigers
- (England) Amy Layzell to (England) Loughborough Lightning

== Leicester Tigers ==
=== Players in ===
- (South Africa) Amber Schonert from (England) Sale Sharks
- (Ireland) Beth Cregan from (Australia) Power House
- (Ireland) Ali Coleman from (Australia) Power House
- (Australia) Jemima McCalman from (France) Blagnac
- (Samoa) Easter Savelio from (Australia) ACT Brumbies
- (England) Grace Deane from (England) Loughborough Lightning
- (England) Lucy Weaver from (England) Loughborough Lightning
- (Australia) Deni Ross from (Australia) Queensland Reds
- (United States) Kristin Bitter from (United States) Denver Onyx
- (France) Eneka Labeyrie from (France) Lyon OU
- (Wales) Katherine Baverstock from (England) Loughborough Lightning
- (England) Abileigh Priestnall from (England) Gloucester–Hartpury
- (England) Abbie Lamb from (England) Bath
- (England) Alicia Watkins from (England) Cheltenham Tigers
- (England) Amelie Anstead from (England) Loughborough Lightning
- (South Africa) Micke Günter from (South Africa) Bulls Daisies
- (England) Georgie Lingham from (United Kingdom) Great Britain 7s
- (England) Beth Taylor from (England) Cheltenham Tigers
- (United States) Emerson Allen from (United States) Twin Cities Gemini
- (England) Ella-Mae Fereday from (England) Lichfield
- (England) Lauren Poole from (England) Harlequins
- (England) Zara Pickwick from (England) Buckingham Swans
- (England) Hermione Farmer from (England) Novocastrians
- (England) Summer Reeves from (England) City of Oxford College
- (Ireland) Olivia Tallon from (Australia) Western Force
- (Japan) Wako Kitano from (Japan) Mie Pearls
- (England) Phoebe Andrews from (England) Loughborough Lightning

=== Players out ===
- (England) Megan Jones to (England) Trailfinders
- (England) Amy Cokayne to (England) Sale Sharks
- (England) Charlotte Fray to (England) Sale Sharks
- (Scotland) Francesca McGhie to (England) Trailfinders
- (England) Natasha Jones (retired)
- (Canada) Claire Gallagher to (England) Trailfinders
- (United States) Tahlia Brody to (England) Loughborough Lightning
- (Scotland) Eva Donaldson to (England) Sale Sharks
- (United States) Keia Mae Sagapolu to (England) Loughborough Lightning
- (Scotland) Evie Wills to (England) Sale Sharks
- (England) Celia Quansah to (England) Trailfinders
- (Canada) Julia Omokhuale to (England) Saracens
- (Wales) Abbey Constable (released)
- (South Africa) Catha Jacobs (released)
- (England) Roisin McBrien (released)
- (Scotland) Nikki Simpson (released)
- (Sweden) Amanda Swartz (released)
- (Scotland) Leah Bartlett to (England) Sale Sharks
- (England) Amy Relf to (England) Sale Sharks
- (England) Katie Childs to (England) Sale Sharks
- (Wales) Amelia Tutt to (England) Saracens
- (England) Sophie Benavent to (England) Sale Sharks

== Loughborough Lightning ==
=== Players in ===
- (United States) Tahlia Brody from (England) Leicester Tigers
- (United States) Keia Mae Sagapolu from (England) Leicester Tigers
- (Scotland) Lucia Scott from (England) Gloucester–Hartpury
- (United States) Rachel Ehrecke from (United States) Denver Onyx
- (Canada) Fancy Bermudez from (England) Saracens
- (England) Amy Layzell from (England) Harlequins
- (United States) Paige Stathopoulos from (United States) Boston Banshees (short-term deal)

=== Players out ===
- (United States) Hallie Taufo'ou to (United States) Denver Onyx
- (England) Grace Deane to (England) Leicester Tigers
- (England) Lucy Weaver to (England) Leicester Tigers
- (Wales) Katherine Baverstock to (England) Leicester Tigers
- (Scotland) Rachel Malcolm to (England) Trailfinders
- (Scotland) Emma Wassell to (England) Trailfinders
- (England) Amelie Anstead to (England) Leicester Tigers
- (England) Jodie Verghese to (England) Saracens
- (Wales) Sydney Mead to (England) Saracens
- Krissy Scurfield to Canada 7s
- (Scotland) Cieron Bell (released)
- (England) Emily Scarratt (retired)
- (England) Laura Keates (retired)
- (Canada) Abigail Duguid to (England) Exeter Chiefs
- (England) Issy Winter to (England) Saracens
- (England) Phoebe Andrews to (England) Leicester Tigers
- (England) Ellen Scantlebury to (England) Exeter Chiefs

== Sale Sharks ==
=== Players in ===
- (England) Amy Cokayne from (England) Leicester Tigers
- (England) Charlotte Fray from (England) Leicester Tigers
- (Wales) Courtney Keight from (England) Bristol Bears
- (England) Holly Aitchison from (England) Bristol Bears
- (Scotland) Eva Donaldson from (England) Leicester Tigers
- (Scotland) Evie Wills from (England) Leicester Tigers
- (Scotland) Rhona Lloyd from (France) Stade Bordelais
- (Scotland) Leah Bartlett from (England) Leicester Tigers
- (Spain) Carmen Castellucci from (England) Gloucester–Hartpury
- (England) Amy Relf from (England) Leicester Tigers
- (England) Katie Childs from (England) Leicester Tigers
- (England) Sharifa Kasolo from (England) Saracens
- (Scotland) Shona Campbell from (United Kingdom) Great Britain 7s
- (England) Sophie Benavent from (England) Leicester Tigers
- (Ireland) Brittany Hogan from (Ireland) Wolfhounds
- (Canada) Asia Hogan-Rochester from (Canada) Toronto Nomads (short-term deal)

=== Players out ===
- (United States) Catie Benson to (United States) Boston Banshees
- (Ireland) Lauren Delany (retired)
- (United States) India Perris-Redding (retired)
- (England) Hollie Bawden (released)
- (England) Eloise Hayward (released)
- (Wales) Meg Fisher (released)
- (England) Jess Panayiotou (released)
- (Netherlands) Elizabeth Shermer to (France) Stade villeneuvois Lille Métropole
- (South Africa) Amber Schonert to (England) Leicester Tigers
- (England) Niamh Swailes to (England) Trailfinders
- (Italy) Sofia Stefan to (France) Toulon Provence Méditerranée
- (England) Sophie Hopkins to (France) Lyon OU
- (Wales) Robyn Wilkins (retired)

== Saracens ==
=== Players in ===
- (Canada) Julia Omokhuale from (England) Leicester Tigers
- (Canada) Laetitia Royer from (France) ASM Romagnat
- (England) Liz Crake from (England) Trailfinders
- (England) Jemima Moss from (England) Harlequins
- (Wales) Amelia Tutt from (England) Leicester Tigers
- (England) Jodie Verghese from (England) Loughborough Lightning
- (England) Deborah Wills from (England) Bristol Bears
- (United States) Morgan Freeman from (United States) St. Thomas Bobcats
- (Wales) Sydney Mead from (England) Loughborough Lightning
- Roshini Turner from Hong Kong FC
- (Scotland) Kaylee McHugh from (England) Trailfinders
- Olivia Apps from Canada 7s
- (England) Ellie Cunningham from (England) Exeter Chiefs
- (England) Issy Winter from (England) Loughborough Lightning

=== Players out ===
- (Spain) Jeanina Loyola (retired)
- (England) Sophie Tansley to (England) Harlequins
- (Scotland) Fiona McIntosh to (England) Harlequins
- (Scotland) Coreen Grant to (England) Harlequins
- (England) Sharifa Kasolo to (England) Sale Sharks
- (Wales) Natalia John to (England) Bristol Bears
- (England) Bryony Cleall (retired)
- (Canada) Fancy Bermudez to (England) Loughborough Lightning
- (Canada) Maya Montiel to (England) Trailfinders
- (Canada) McKinley Hunt (retired)
- (Ireland) Hannah Casey (retired)

== Trailfinders ==
=== Players in ===
- (England) Megan Jones from (England) Leicester Tigers
- (Scotland) Francesca McGhie from (England) Leicester Tigers
- (Canada) Claire Gallagher from (England) Leicester Tigers
- (England) Niamh Swailes from (England) Sale Sharks
- (Australia) Haidee Head from (Australia) Queensland Reds
- (Wales) Cana Williams from (Wales) Gwalia Lightning
- (New Zealand) Alana Borland from (New Zealand) Matatū
- (Scotland) Rachel Malcolm from (England) Loughborough Lightning
- (Scotland) Emma Wassell from (England) Loughborough Lightning
- (Wales) Manon Johnes from (New Zealand) University of Canterbury
- (England) Flo Long from (England) Exeter Chiefs
- (England) Celia Quansah from (England) Leicester Tigers
- (England) Isla Norman-Bell from (United Kingdom) Great Britain 7s
- (England) Kim Grundy from (England) Henley Hawks
- (New Zealand) Georgia Ponsonby from (New Zealand) Matatū
- (Canada) Mikiela Nelson from (England) Exeter Chiefs
- (Canada) Maya Montiel from (England) Saracens
- (New Zealand) Maia Roos from (New Zealand) Blues
- (New Zealand) Tanya Kalounivale from (New Zealand) Chiefs Manawa

=== Players out ===
- (United States) Paige Stathopoulos to (United States) Boston Banshees
- (England) Rowena Burnfield (retired)
- (England) Megan Barwick to (England) Harlequins
- (Scotland) Fiona Cooper (released)
- (Canada) Kendra Cousineau (released)
- (Scotland) Sarah Denholm (released)
- (England) Rosie Dobson (released)
- (Wales) Kat Evans (released)
- (South Africa) Lindelwa Gwala (released)
- (Scotland) Liz Musgrove (released)
- (Ireland) Andrea Stock (released)
- (Japan) Kie Tamai (released)
- (Scotland) Chloe Rollie to (France) Toulon Provence Méditerranée
- (England) Liz Crake to (England) Saracens
- (Canada) Tyson Beukeboom to (Canada) Cowichan
- (Scotland) Kaylee McHugh to (England) Saracens
- (Scotland) Caity Mattinson (retired)
- (England) Abby Dow (retired)
