= 2021 Women's Six Nations Championship =

Women's rugby union competition

- Date: 3–24 April 2021
- Countries: England; France; Ireland; Italy; Scotland; Wales

Tournament statistics
- Champions: England (17th title)
- Matches played: 9
- Top point scorer: (England) Emily Scarratt (39)
- Top try scorer: (France) Caroline Boujard (5)
- Player of the tournament: (England) Poppy Cleall
- Official website: Official website

The 2021 Women's Six Nations Championship was the 20th series of the Women's Six Nations Championship, an annual women's rugby union competition featuring England, France, Ireland, Italy, Scotland and Wales. The format for the 2021 tournament was changed from the traditional eight-week round-robin format to a four-week format consisting of two pools of three teams with a final, inspired by the format of the Autumn Nations Cup, which replaced the 2020 Autumn Internationals. The tournament was held from 3 to 24 April 2021.

As not all teams played each other, the Grand Slam and Triple Crown were not contested.

== Background and format ==
Traditionally, the Women's Six Nations Championship is run concurrently with the men's tournament. However, in January 2021, the 2021 Women's Six Nations Championship was postponed due to the COVID-19 pandemic, which caused travel and time restrictions issues due to qualification of the 2021 Rugby World Cup needing to be completed before the tournament starting in September. Most of the players have jobs outside of rugby, and some players are key workers. This, combined with national lockdowns and the need for COVID-19 testing, made it more difficult to schedule the matches during the pandemic.

On 3 February, it was announced that the 2021 Women's Six Nations Championship would take place between 3 and 25 April, in a condensed format. The six teams were split into two pools of three teams. Each team played the other two teams in their pool, with one match at home and one away. Each team had one bye weekend. The winners of the two pools met in the final, as did the two second and third-placed teams from each pool. The team in Pool A hosted regardless of who performed better in their pool, and the winner of the play-off between the two first-ranked sides won the tournament. The format is similar to the 2020 men's Autumn Nations Cup. Provisional fixture lists were also announced on 3 February, and the venues and kick-off times were announced on 23 March.

== Pool stage ==
=== Pool A ===
Position	Nation	Matches				Points			Tries		Bonus points		Table points
Position	Nation	Played	Won	Drawn	Lost	For	Against	Diff	For	Against	T BP	L BP	Table points
1	England	2	2	0	0	119	13	+106	17	1	2	0	10
2	Italy	2	1	0	1	44	87	–43	7	11	1	0	5
3	Scotland	2	0	0	2	30	93	–63	3	15	0	0	0

==== Fixtures ====
Test: 1401	3 April 2021	(1 BP) England	52–10	Scotland	Castle Park, Doncaster
	15:00 BST (UTC+01:00)	Try: Packer 9' c Riley 16' m Davies 27' c B. Cleall 35' c Breach 37' c Rowland 43' c P. Cleall 70' m Penalty try 77'; Con: Scarratt (5/6) 9', 27', 35', 38', 44'	Report	Try: Smith 54' c Con: Nelson (1/1) 55'; Pen: Nelson (1/1) 23'	Attendance: 4,674; Referee: Aurélie Groizeleau (France)

Team details

FB	15	Sarah McKenna
RW	14	Lydia Thompson		(substituted off) 63'
OC	13	Emily Scarratt (c)		(substituted off) 63'
IC	12	Lagi Tuima
LW	11	Jess Breach
FH	10	Helena Rowland
SH	9	Leanne Riley		(substituted off) 63'
N8	8	Poppy Cleall	(yellow card) 51'
OF	7	Marlie Packer		(substituted off) 58'
BF	6	Zoe Aldcroft
RL	5	Catherine O'Donnell		(substituted off) 63'
LL	4	Abbie Ward
TP	3	Bryony Cleall		(substituted off) 56'
HK	2	Lark Davies	(yellow card) 57'	(substituted off) 67'
LP	1	Victoria Cornborough		(substituted off) 63'
Replacements:
HK	16	Amy Cokayne		(substituted on) 58'
PR	17	Detysha Harper		(substituted on) 63'
PR	18	Shaunagh Brown		(substituted on) 56'
LK	19	Harriet Millar-Mills		(substituted on) 63'
FL	20	Victoria Fleetwood		(substituted on) 67'
SH	21	Claudia MacDonald		(substituted on) 63'
FH	22	Megan Jones		(substituted on) 63'
FB	23	Ellie Kildunne		(substituted on) 63'
Coach:
Simon Middleton

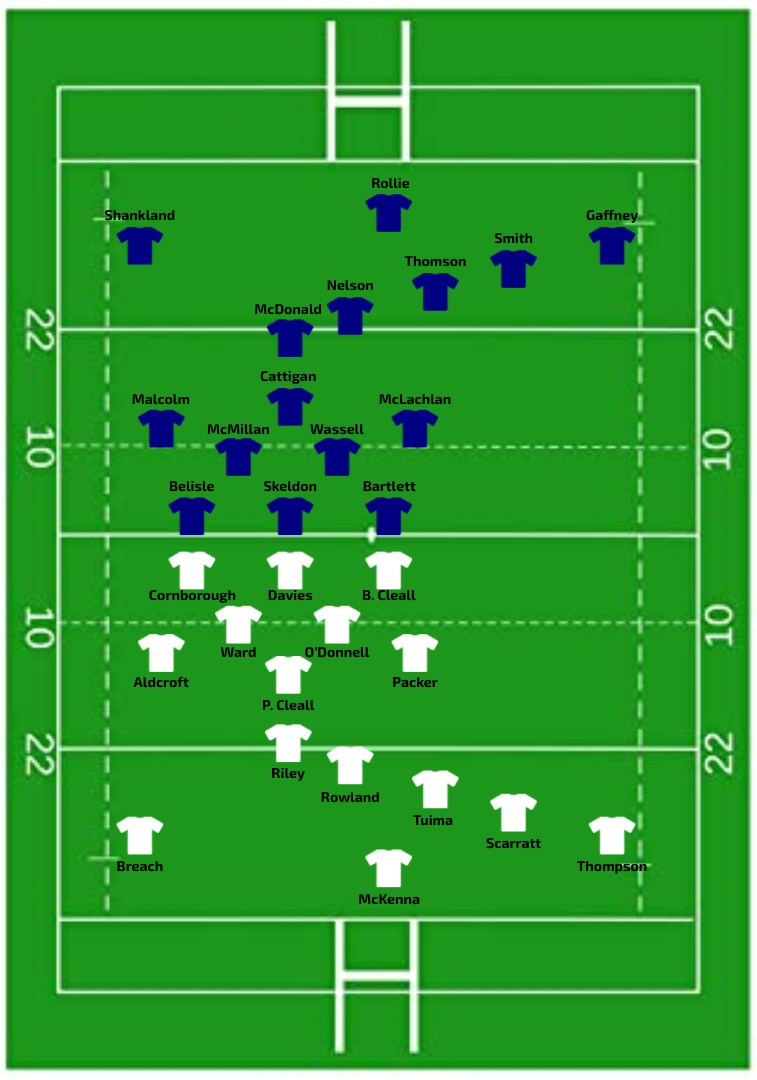

FB	15	Chloe Rollie
RW	14	Rachel Shankland		(substituted off) 40'
OC	13	Hannah Smith
IC	12	Lisa Thomson	(yellow card) 35'
LW	11	Megan Gaffney
FH	10	Helen Nelson
SH	9	Mairi McDonald		(substituted off) 63'
N8	8	Siobhan Cattigan
OF	7	Rachel McLachlan
BF	6	Rachel Malcolm (c)		(substituted off) 40'
RL	5	Louise McMillan	(yellow card) 78'
LL	4	Emma Wassell
TP	3	Christine Belisle		(substituted off) 60'
HK	2	Lana Skeldon
LP	1	Leah Bartlett		(substituted off) 71'
Replacements:
HK	16	Molly Wright	(red card) 63'	(substituted on) 60'
PR	17	Panashe Muzambe		(substituted on) 71'
PR	18	Lisa Cockburn			(substituted on) 63'
LK	19	Evie Gallagher		(substituted on) 40'	(substituted off) 63'
FL	20	Jodie Rettie
SH	21	Jenny Maxwell		(substituted on) 63'
FH	22	Sarah Law
WG	23	Liz Musgrove		(substituted on) 40'
Coach:
Bryan Easson

Player of the Match:
Poppy Cleall (England)

Touch judges:
Beatrice Benvenuti (Italy)
Maria Pacifico (Italy)
Television match official:
Joy Neville (Ireland)

Test: 1403	10 April 2021	Italy	3–67	England (1 BP)	Stadio Sergio Lanfranchi, Parma
	15:00 CET (UTC+01:00)	Pen: Sillari (1/1) 35'	Report	Try: Scarratt 23' c Fleetwood 30' c Dow (2) 55' c, 61' c Millar-Mills 58' c Rowland 60' c B. Cleall 70' c MacDonald 79' c Davies 80' +3 m Con: Scarratt (8/9) 24', 32', 56', 58', 61', 63', 71', 80'; Pen: Rowland (1/1) 37'; Scarratt (1/1) 47'	Referee: Aurélie Groizeleau (France)

Team details

FB	15	Manuela Furlan (c)
RW	14	Aura Muzzo		(substituted off) 72'
OC	13	Michela Sillari
IC	12	Beatrice Rigoni		(substituted off) 72'
LW	11	Maria Magatti
FH	10	Veronica Madia
SH	9	Sara Barattin	(yellow card) 54'	(substituted off) 65'
N8	8	Elisa Giordano
OF	7	Giada Franco		(substituted off) 65'
BF	6	Ilaria Arrighetti		(substituted off) 44'
RL	5	Giordana Duca
LL	4	Valeria Fedrighi		(substituted off) 65'
TP	3	Lucia Gai
HK	2	Lucia Cammarano		(substituted off) 65'
LP	1	Erika Skofca	(yellow card) 70'
Replacements:
HK	16	Melissa Bettoni		(substituted on) 44'
PR	17	Gaia Maris		(substituted on) 72'
PR	18	Sara Tounesi
LK	19	Isabella Locatelli		(substituted on) 68'
FL	20	Beatrice Veronese		(substituted on) 65'
FL	21	Francesca Sgorbini		(substituted on) 68'
SH	22	Sofia Stefan		(substituted on) 65'
CE	23	Alyssa D'Incà		(substituted on) 72'
Coach:
Andrea di Giandomenico

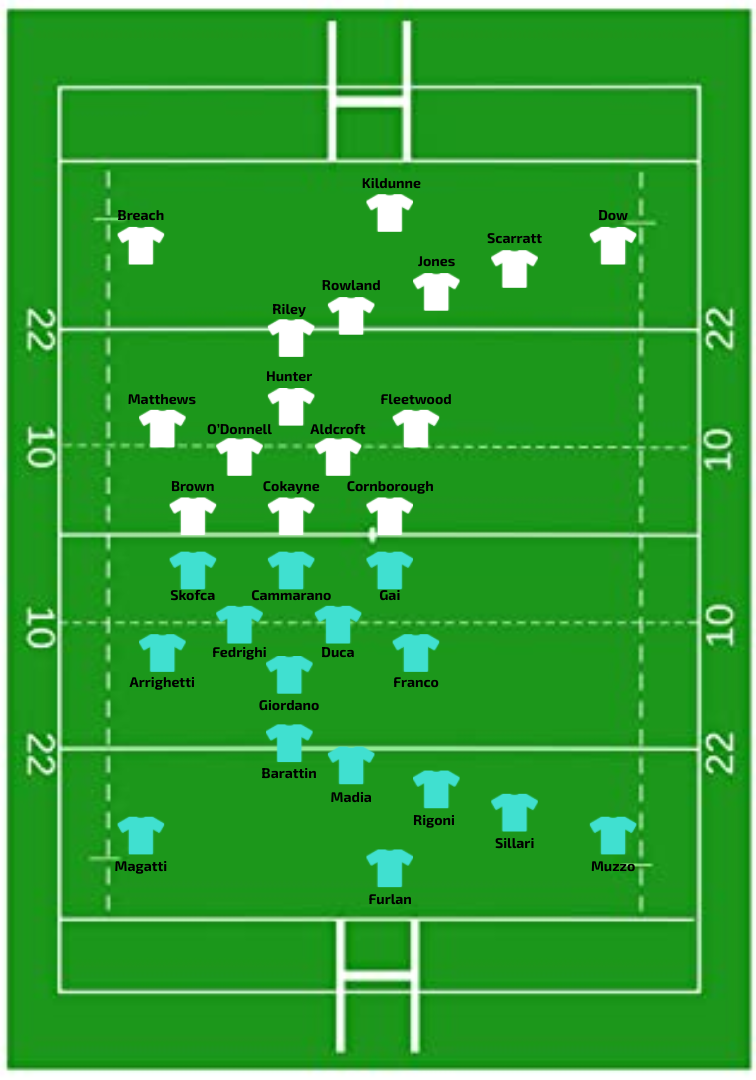

FB	15	Ellie Kildunne
RW	14	Jess Breach		(substituted off) 61'
OC	13	Emily Scarratt	(yellow card) 34'
IC	12	Megan Jones		(substituted off) 62'
LW	11	Abigail Dow
FH	10	Helena Rowland
SH	9	Leanne Riley		(substituted off) 64'
N8	8	Sarah Hunter (c)		(substituted off) 54'
OF	7	Victoria Fleetwood
BF	6	Alex Matthews
RL	5	Catherine O'Donnell		(substituted off) 56'
LL	4	Zoe Aldcroft
TP	3	Shaunagh Brown		(substituted off) 59'
HK	2	Amy Cokayne		(substituted off) 57'
LP	1	Victoria Cornborough		(substituted off) 57'
Replacements:
HK	16	Lark Davies		(substituted on) 57'
PR	17	Hannah Botterman		(substituted on) 57'
PR	18	Bryony Cleall		(substituted on) 59'
LK	19	Harriet Millar-Mills		(substituted on) 56'
FL	20	Poppy Cleall		(substituted on) 54'
SH	21	Claudia MacDonald		(substituted on) 64'
FH	22	Zoe Harrison		(substituted on) 62'
FB	23	Sarah McKenna		(substituted on) 61'
Coach:
Simon Middleton

Player of the Match:
Megan Jones (England)

Touch judges:
Doriane Domenjo (France)
Francesca Martin (Wales)
Television match official:
Neil Paterson (Scotland)

Test: 1405	17 April 2021	Scotland	20–41	Italy (1 BP)	Scotstoun Stadium, Glasgow
	17:00 BST (UTC+01:00)	Try: Skeldon 23' c Wassell 73' c Con: Nelson (2/2) 24', 74'; Pen: Nelson (2/2) 40', 46'	Report	Try: Rigoni (2) 7' c, 68' m Furlan (3) 10' m, 59' m, 79' c Arrighetti 40' +1 c Ostuni Minuzzi 42' m Con: Sillari (3/7) 8', 40' +2, 80'	Referee: Nikki O'Donnell (England)

Team details

FB	15	Chloe Rollie
RW	14	Liz Musgrove	(substituted off) 60'
OC	13	Lisa Thomson
IC	12	Helen Nelson (c)
LW	11	Megan Gaffney
FH	10	Sarah Law	(substituted off) 70'
SH	9	Mairi McDonald	(substituted off) 54'
N8	8	Siobhan Cattigan
OF	7	Rachel McLachlan
BF	6	Evie Gallagher
RL	5	Louise McMillan
LL	4	Emma Wassell
TP	3	Megan Kennedy	(substituted off) 47'
HK	2	Lana Skeldon
LP	1	Leah Bartlett	(substituted off) 70'
Replacements:
HK	16	Jodie Rettie
PR	17	Lisa Cockburn	(substituted on) 70'
PR	18	Panashe Muzambe
LK	19	Christine Belisle	(substituted on) 47'
FL	20	Nicola Howat
SH	21	Jenny Maxwell	(substituted on) 54'
CE	22	Evie Wills	(substituted on) 70'
WG	23	Coreen Grant	(substituted on) 60'
Coach:
Bryan Easson

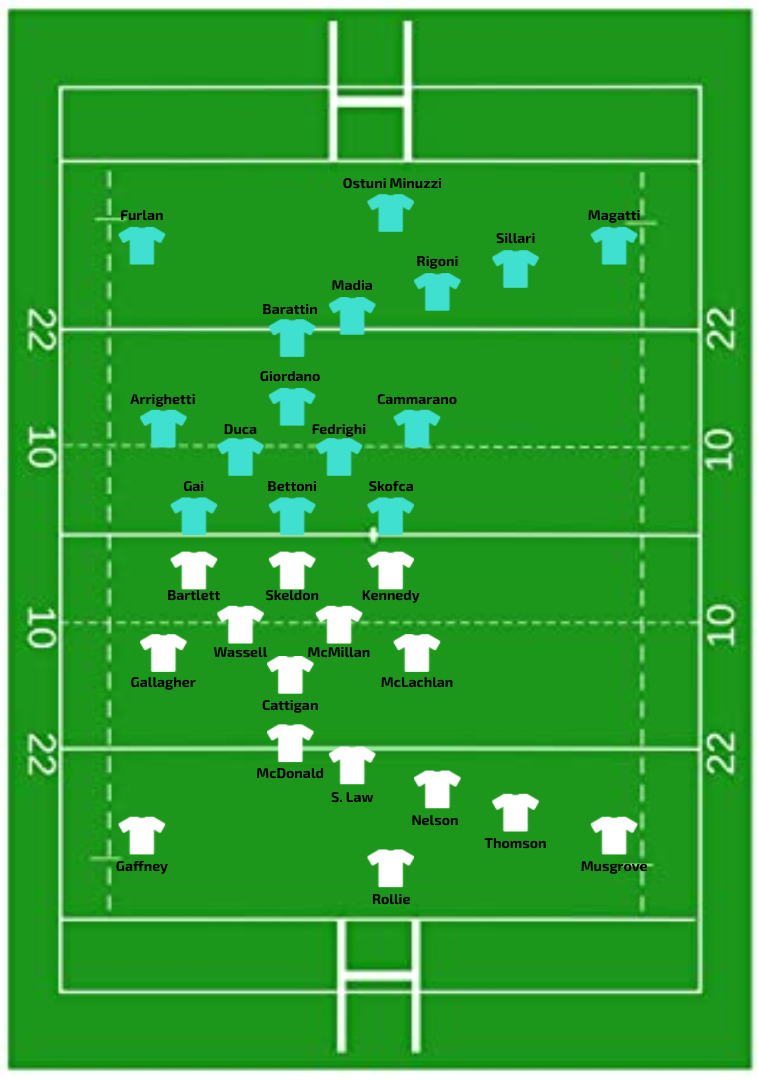

FB	15	Vittoria Ostuni Minuzzi	(substituted off) 60'
RW	14	Manuela Furlan (c)
OC	13	Michela Sillari
IC	12	Beatrice Rigoni
LW	11	Maria Magatti
FH	10	Veronica Madia
SH	9	Sara Barattin	(substituted off) 72'
N8	8	Elisa Giordano
OF	7	Lucia Cammarano	(substituted off) 78'
BF	6	Ilaria Arrighetti
RL	5	Giordana Duca	(substituted off) 70'
LL	4	Valeria Fedrighi	(substituted off) 79'
TP	3	Lucia Gai	(substituted off) 61'
HK	2	Melissa Bettoni	(substituted off) 74'
LP	1	Erika Skofca	(substituted off) 66'
Replacements:
HK	16	Silvia Turani	(substituted on) 61'
PR	17	Gaia Maris	(substituted on) 66'
PR	18	Sara Tounesi	(substituted on) 74'
LK	19	Isabella Locatelli	(substituted on) 70'
FL	20	Beatrice Veronese	(substituted on) 79'
FL	21	Francesca Sgorbini	(substituted on) 78'
SH	22	Sofia Stefan	(substituted on) 72'
WG	23	Aura Muzzo	(substituted on) 66'
Coach:
Andrea di Giandomenico

Player of the Match:
Beatrice Rigoni (Italy)

Touch judges:
Aurélie Groizeleau (France)
Doriane Domenjo (France)
Television match official:
Ian Tempest (England)

=== Pool B ===
Position	Nation	Matches				Points			Tries		Bonus points		Table points
Position	Nation	Played	Won	Drawn	Lost	For	Against	Diff	For	Against	T BP	L BP	Table points
1	France	2	2	0	0	109	15	+94	16	2	2	0	10
2	Ireland	2	1	0	1	60	56	+4	9	8	1	0	5
3	Wales	2	0	0	2	0	98	–98	0	15	0	0	0

==== Fixtures ====
Test: 1402	3 April 2021	(1 BP) France	53–0	Wales	Stade de la Rabine, Vannes
	20:00 CET (UTC+01:00)	Try: Boujard (3) 3' c, 6' c, 15' c Sochat 35' c Gros (2) 53' m, 62' c Boulard 78' m Touyé 80' +4 m Con: Bourdon (5/8) 4', 7', 16', 36', 63'; Pen: Bourdon (1/1) 31'	Report		Referee: Nikki O'Donnell (England)

Team details

FB	15	Emilie Boulard
RW	14	Caroline Boujard
OC	13	Maëlle Filopon
IC	12	Gabrielle Vernier
LW	11	Marine Ménager	(substituted off) 34'
FH	10	Morgane Peyronnet	(substituted off) 62'
SH	9	Pauline Bourdon	(substituted off) 70'
N8	8	Emeline Gros
OF	7	Gaëlle Hermet (c)
BF	6	Céline Ferer	(substituted off) 64'
RL	5	Madoussou Fall	(substituted off) 57'
LL	4	Coumba Diallo
TP	3	Clara Joyeux	(substituted off) 66'
HK	2	Agathe Sochat	(substituted off) 62'
LP	1	Annaëlle Deshayes	(substituted off) 62'
Replacements:
HK	16	Laure Touyé	(substituted on) 62'
PR	17	Arkya Ait Lahbib	(substituted on) 66'
PR	18	Diha Maylïs Traoré	(substituted on) 62'
LK	19	Safi N'Diaye	(substituted on) 57'
FL	20	Marjorie Mayans	(substituted on) 64'
SH	21	Laure Sansus	(substituted on) 70'
FH	22	Camille Imart	(substituted on) 62'
FB	23	Jessy Tremouliere	(substituted on) 34'
Coach:
Annick Hayraud

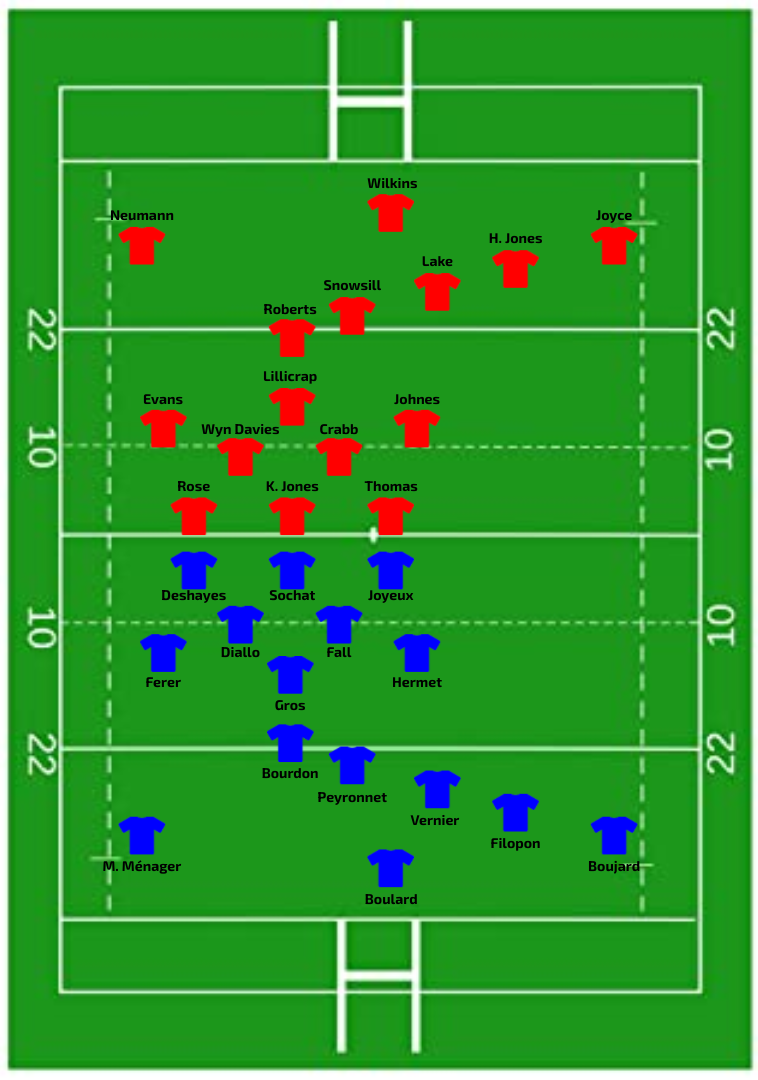

FB	15	Robyn Wilkins
RW	14	Lisa Neumann		(substituted off) 70'
OC	13	Hannah Jones
IC	12	Kerin Lake		(substituted off) 55'
LW	11	Jasmine Joyce
FH	10	Elinor Snowsill
SH	9	Jessica Roberts		(substituted off) 59'
N8	8	Siwan Lillicrap (c)		(substituted off) 70'
OF	7	Manon Johnes
BF	6	Georgia Evans	(yellow card) 80+4'
RL	5	Teleri Wyn Davies		(substituted off) 49'
LL	4	Gwen Crabb
TP	3	Donna Rose		(substituted off) 49'
HK	2	Kelsey Jones
LP	1	Caryl Thomas		(substituted off) 60'
Replacements:
HK	16	Robyn Lock
PR	17	Cara Hope		(substituted on) 60'
PR	18	Cerys Hale		(substituted on) 49'
FL	19	Bethan Dainton		(substituted on) 70'
LK	20	Natalia John		(substituted on) 49'
SH	21	Megan Davies		(substituted on) 59'
CE	22	Gemma Rowland		(substituted on) 55'
CE	23	Courtney Keight		(substituted on) 70'
Coach:
Warren Abrahams

Player of the Match:
Gabrielle Vernier (France)

Touch judges:
Hollie Davidson (Scotland)
Katherine Ritchie (England)
Television match official:
Stefano Penne (Italy)

Test: 1404	10 April 2021	Wales	0–45	Ireland (1 BP)	Cardiff Arms Park, Cardiff
	18:00 BST (UTC+01:00)		Report	Try: Considine (2) 3' m, 18' c Parsons (2) 10' c, 15' m Naoupu 28' c Wall 72' c Tyrrell 80' +1 c Con: Tyrrell (5/7) 12', 19', 28', 74', 80' +2	Referee: Hollie Davidson (Scotland)

Team details

FB	15	Robyn Wilkins
RW	14	Lisa Neumann
OC	13	Hannah Jones
IC	12	Kerin Lake	(substituted off) 40'
LW	11	Courtney Keight	(substituted off) 34'
FH	10	Elinor Snowsill
SH	9	Jessica Roberts	(substituted off) 29'
N8	8	Siwan Lillicrap (c)	(substituted off) 77'
OF	7	Manon Johnes	(substituted off) 57'
BF	6	Georgia Evans
RL	5	Gwen Crabb
LL	4	Natalia John	(substituted off) 56'
TP	3	Cerys Hale	(substituted off) 40'
HK	2	Kelsey Jones	(substituted off) 40'
LP	1	Cara Hope	(substituted off) 40'
Replacements:
HK	16	Molly Kelly	(substituted on) 40'
PR	17	Caryl Thomas	(substituted on) 40'
PR	18	Donna Rose	(substituted on) 40'
LK	19	Teleri Wyn Davies	(substituted on) 56'
FL	20	Bethan Dainton	(substituted on) 57'
SH	21	Megan Davies	(substituted on) 29'
CE	22	Niamh Terry	(substituted on) 40'
WG	23	Caitlin Lewis	(substituted on) 34'
Coach:
Warren Abrahams

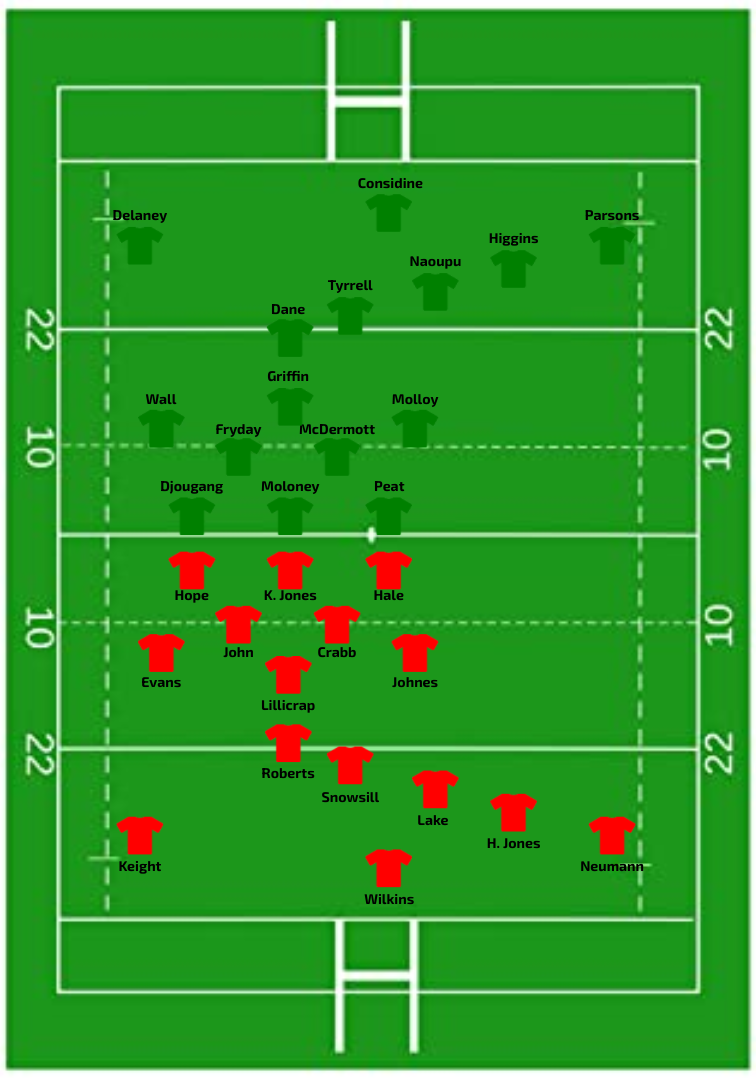

FB	15	Eimear Considine	(substituted off) 63'
RW	14	Lauren Delaney	(substituted off) 55'
OC	13	Eve Higgins
IC	12	Sene Naoupu
LW	11	Beibhinn Parsons
FH	10	Hannah Tyrrell
SH	9	Kathryn Dane	(substituted off) 63'
N8	8	Ciara Griffin (c)	(substituted off) 63'
OF	7	Claire Molloy
BF	6	Dorothy Wall
RL	5	Nicola Fryday	(substituted off) 59'
LL	4	Aoife McDermott
TP	3	Linda Djougang	(substituted off) 71'
HK	2	Cliodhna Moloney	(substituted off) 69'
LP	1	Lindsay Peat	(substituted off) 59'
Replacements:
HK	16	Neve Jones	(substituted on) 69'
PR	17	Katie O'Dwyer	(substituted on) 59'
PR	18	Laura Feely	(substituted on) 71'
LK	19	Brittany Hogan	(substituted on) 59'
FL	20	Hannah O'Connor	(substituted on) 63'
SH	21	Emily Lane	(substituted on) 63'
CE	22	Stacey Flood	(substituted on) 55'
WG	23	Enya Breen	(substituted on) 63'
Coach:
Adam Griggs

Player of the Match:
Hannah Tyrrell (Ireland)

Touch judges:
Sara Cox (England)
Maria Pacifico (Italy)
Television match official:
Marius Mitrea (Italy)

Test: 1406	17 April 2021	Ireland	15–56	France (1 BP)	Donnybrook Stadium, Dublin
	14:15 IST (UTC+01:00)	Try: Moloney 27' m Hooban 74' c Con: Flood (1/1) 75'; Pen: Tyrrell (1/1) 6'	Report	Try: Boujard (2) 14' c, 47' m Boulard 19' c Penalty try 22'; N'Diaye 34' c Banet (2) 39' c, 72' m R. Ménager 57' m Con: Drouin (4/7) 15', 20', 35', 40'; Pen: Drouin (2/2) 31', 66'	Referee: Sara Cox (England)

Team details

FB	15	Eimear Considine
RW	14	Lauren Delaney		(substituted off) 49'
OC	13	Eve Higgins
IC	12	Sene Naoupu
LW	11	Beibhinn Parsons
FH	10	Hannah Tyrrell		(substituted off) 54'
SH	9	Kathryn Dane		(substituted off) 54'
N8	8	Ciara Griffin (c)
OF	7	Claire Molloy		(substituted off) 54'
BF	6	Dorothy Wall
RL	5	Nicola Fryday
LL	4	Aoife McDermott	(yellow card) 23'	(substituted off) 49'
TP	3	Linda Djougang		(substituted off) 59'
HK	2	Cliodhna Moloney		(substituted off) 59'
LP	1	Lindsay Peat		(substituted off) 59'
Replacements:
HK	16	Emma Hooban		(substituted on) 59'
PR	17	Katie O'Dwyer		(substituted on) 59'
PR	18	Laura Feely		(substituted on) 59'
LK	19	Brittany Hogan		(substituted on) 49'
FL	20	Hannah O'Connor		(substituted on) 54'
SH	21	Emily Lane		(substituted on) 54'
CE	22	Stacey Flood		(substituted on) 54'
WG	23	Amee-Leigh Murphy Crowe	(yellow card) 66'	(substituted on) 49'
Coach:
Adam Griggs

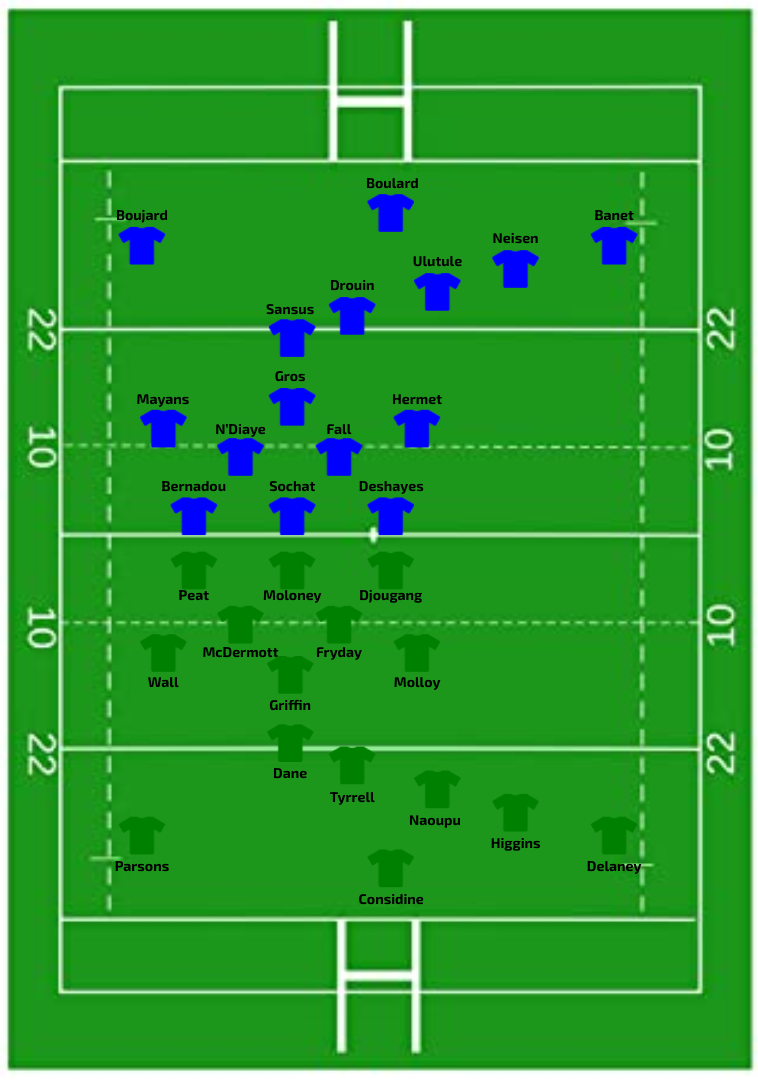

FB	15	Emilie Boulard
RW	14	Caroline Boujard	(substituted off) 66'
OC	13	Carla Neisen	(substituted off) 63'
IC	12	Jade Ulutule
LW	11	Cyrielle Banet
FH	10	Caroline Drouin
SH	9	Laure Sansus	(substituted off) 55'
N8	8	Emeline Gros	(substituted off) 49'
OF	7	Gaëlle Hermet (c)	(substituted off) 55'
BF	6	Marjorie Mayans
RL	5	Safi N'Diaye
LL	4	Madoussou Fall
TP	3	Rose Bernadou	(substituted off) 49'
HK	2	Agathe Sochat	(substituted off) 66'
LP	1	Annaëlle Deshayes	(substituted off) 63'
Replacements:
HK	16	Laure Touyé	(substituted on) 66'
PR	17	Diha Maïlys Traoré	(substituted on) 63'
PR	18	Clara Joyeux	(substituted on) 49'
LK	19	Coumba Diallo	(substituted on) 55'
N8	20	Romane Ménager	(substituted on) 49'
SH	21	Pauline Bourdon	(substituted on) 55'
FH	22	Morgane Peyronnet	(substituted on) 66'
CE	23	Gabrielle Vernier	(substituted on) 63'
Coach:
Annick Hayraud

Player of the Match:
Marjorie Mayans (France)

Touch judges:
Hollie Davidson (Scotland)
Katherine Ritchie (England)
Television match official:
Claire Hodnett (England)

== Finals ==
=== 5th/6th place ===
Test: 1407	24 April 2021	Scotland	27–20	Wales	Scotstoun Stadium, Glasgow
	17:00 BST (UTC+01:00)	Try: Gaffney 5' m Kennedy 29' c Belisle 35' m Gallagher 54' c Con: Nelson (2/4) 30', 55'; Pen: Nelson (1/1) 70'	Report	Try: Neumann 42' c C. Lewis 80' +3 c Con: Wilkins (2/2) 43', 80' +4; Pen: Wilkins (2/3) 21', 26'	Referee: Clara Munarini (Italy)

Team details

FB	15	Chloe Rollie
RW	14	Liz Musgrove
OC	13	Hannah Smith
IC	12	Lisa Thomson
LW	11	Megan Gaffney
FH	10	Helen Nelson (c)
SH	9	Jenny Maxwell
N8	8	Siobhan Cattigan	22' to 36'
OF	7	Rachel McLachlan
BF	6	Evie Gallagher
RL	5	Louise McMillan
LL	4	Emma Wassell
TP	3	Megan Kennedy	(substituted off) 60'
HK	2	Lana Skeldon
LP	1	Christine Belisle	(substituted off) 71'
Replacements:
HK	16	Jodie Rettie	(substituted on) 22'	(substituted off) 36'
PR	17	Leah Bartlett	(substituted on) 60'
PR	18	Lisa Cockburn	(substituted on) 71'
LK	19	Nicola Howat
SH	20	Mairi McDonald
FH	21	Sarah Law
CE	22	Evie Wills
WG	23	Rachel Shankland
Coach:
Bryan Easson

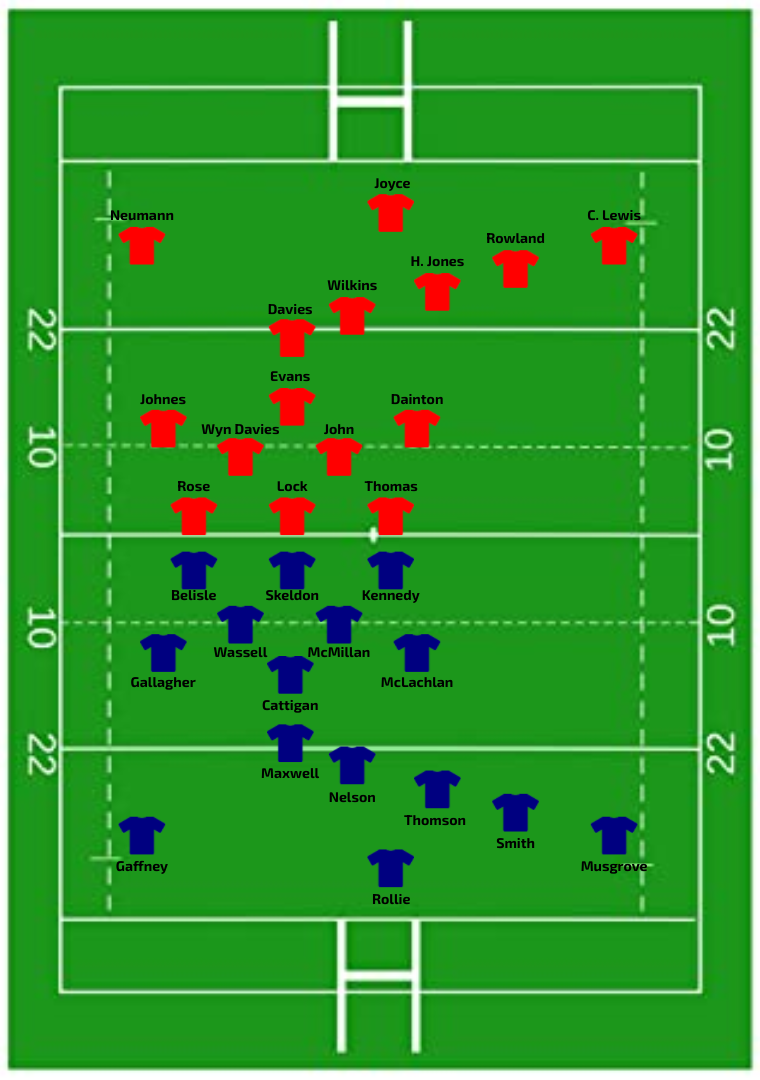

FB	15	Jasmine Joyce
RW	14	Lisa Neumann
OC	13	Gemma Rowland	(substituted off) 80'
IC	12	Hannah Jones (c)
LW	11	Caitlin Lewis
FH	10	Robyn Wilkins
SH	9	Megan Davies	(substituted off) 80'
N8	8	Georgia Evans
OF	7	Bethan Dainton	(substituted off) 60'
BF	6	Manon Johnes
RL	5	Teleri Wyn Davies	(substituted off) 60'
LL	4	Natalia John	(substituted off) 71'
TP	3	Donna Rose	(substituted off) 65'
HK	2	Robyn Lock	(substituted off) 40'
LP	1	Caryl Thomas	(substituted off) 73'
Replacements:
HK	16	Kelsey Jones	(substituted on) 40'
PR	17	Gwenllian Jenkins	(substituted on) 73'
PR	18	Cerys Hale	(substituted on) 65'
LK	19	Gwen Crabb	(substituted on) 60'
FL	20	Shona Powell-Hughes	(substituted on) 60'
FL	21	Abbie Fleming	(substituted on) 71'
SH	22	Jade Knight	(substituted on) 80'
CE	23	Megan Webb	(substituted on) 80'
Coach:
Warren Abrahams

Player of the Match:
Helen Nelson (Scotland)

Touch judges:
Aurélie Groizeleau (France)
Doriane Domenjo (France)
Television match official:
Graham Hughes (England)

=== 3rd/4th place ===
Test: 1408	24 April 2021	Ireland	25–5	Italy	Donnybrook Stadium, Dublin
	12:00 CET (UTC+01:00)	Try: Wall 9' m Murphy Crowe (2) 44' c, 80' +1 m Moloney 52' m Con: Flood (1/4) 45'	Report	Try: Bettoni 69' m	Referee: Sara Cox (England)

Team details

FB	15	Eimear Considine			(substituted off) 79'
RW	14	Amee-Leigh Murphy Crowe
OC	13	Eve Higgins		(substituted off) 73'	(substituted on) 79'
IC	12	Sene Naoupu	(yellow card) 21'
LW	11	Beibhinn Parsons		(substituted off) 61'
FH	10	Stacey Flood
SH	9	Kathryn Dane		(substituted off) 64'
N8	8	Ciara Griffin (c)		(substituted off) 13'
OF	7	Brittany Hogan
BF	6	Dorothy Wall
RL	5	Nicola Fryday
LL	4	Aoife McDermott		(substituted off) 64'
TP	3	Linda Djougang		(substituted off) 64'
HK	2	Cliodhna Moloney		(substituted off) 64'
LP	1	Lindsay Peat		(substituted off) 64'
Replacements:
HK	16	Neve Jones		(substituted on) 64'
PR	17	Laura Feely		(substituted on) 64'
PR	18	Leah Lyons		(substituted on) 64'
LK	19	Grace Moore		(substituted on) 64'
FL	20	Hannah O'Connor		(substituted on) 13'
SH	21	Emily Lane		(substituted on) 64'
FH	22	Hannah Tyrrell		(substituted on) 61'
WG	23	Enya Breen		(substituted on) 73'
Coach:
Adam Griggs

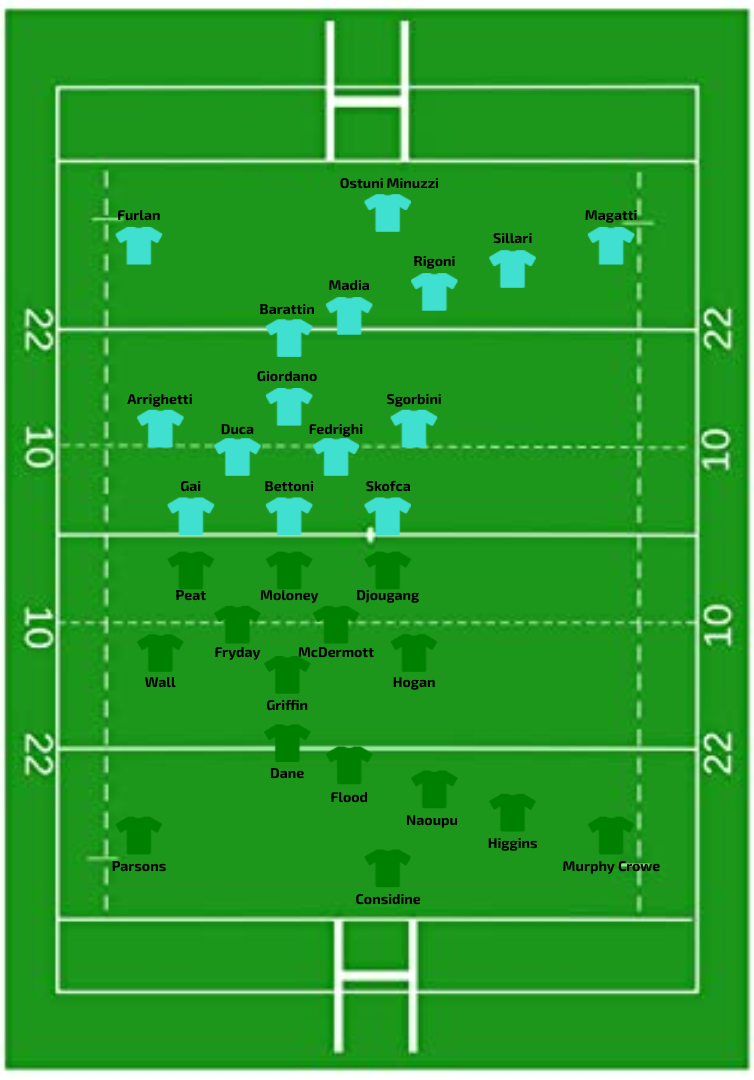

FB	15	Vittoria Ostuni Minuzzi	(substituted off) 73'
RW	14	Manuela Furlan (c)
OC	13	Michela Sillari
IC	12	Beatrice Rigoni
LW	11	Maria Magatti
FH	10	Veronica Madia
SH	9	Sara Barattin	(substituted off) 49'
N8	8	Elisa Giordano
OF	7	Francesca Sgorbini	(substituted off) 73'
BF	6	Ilaria Arrighetti
RL	5	Giordana Duca
LL	4	Valeria Fedrighi	(substituted off) 64'
TP	3	Lucia Gai
HK	2	Melissa Bettoni
LP	1	Erika Skofca	(substituted off) 64'
Replacements:
HK	16	Silvia Turani
PR	17	Gaia Maris	(substituted on) 64'
PR	18	Michela Merlo
LK	19	Sara Tounesi	(substituted on) 64'
FL	20	Isabella Locatelli	(substituted on) 73'
FL	21	Beatrice Veronese
SH	22	Sofia Stefan	(substituted on) 49'
WG	23	Aura Muzzo	(substituted on) 73'
Coach:
Andrea di Giandomenico

Player of the Match:
Stacey Flood (Ireland)

Touch judges:
Nikki O'Donnell (England)
Katherine Ritchie (England)
Television match official:
Ian Tempest (England)

=== 1st/2nd place ===
Test: 1409	24 April 2021	England	10–6	France	Twickenham Stoop, London
	14:00 BST (UTC+01:00)	Try: P. Cleall 39' c Con: Scarratt (1/1) 40'; Pen: Scarratt (1/3) 79'	Report	Pen: Drouin (2/4) 45', 72'	Referee: Hollie Davidson (Scotland)

Team details

FB	15	Sarah McKenna	(substituted off) 68'
RW	14	Jess Breach
OC	13	Emily Scarratt (c)	22' to 32'
IC	12	Zoe Harrison
LW	11	Abigail Dow
FH	10	Helena Rowland
SH	9	Leanne Riley
N8	8	Poppy Cleall	(substituted off) 69'
OF	7	Marlie Packer
BF	6	Zoe Aldcroft
RL	5	Catherine O'Donnell
LL	4	Abbie Ward	(substituted off) 53'
TP	3	Shaunagh Brown	(substituted off) 58'
HK	2	Lark Davies	(substituted off) 53'
LP	1	Victoria Cornborough	(substituted off) 69'
Replacements:
HK	16	Amy Cokayne	(substituted on) 53'
PR	17	Detysha Harper	(substituted on) 69'
PR	18	Bryony Cleall	(substituted on) 58'
LK	19	Harriet Millar-Mills	(substituted on) 69'
N8	20	Sarah Hunter	(substituted on) 53'
SH	21	Claudia MacDonald
CE	22	Lagi Tuima	(substituted on) 22'	(substituted off) 32'
FB	23	Ellie Kildunne	(substituted on) 68'
Coach:
Simon Middleton

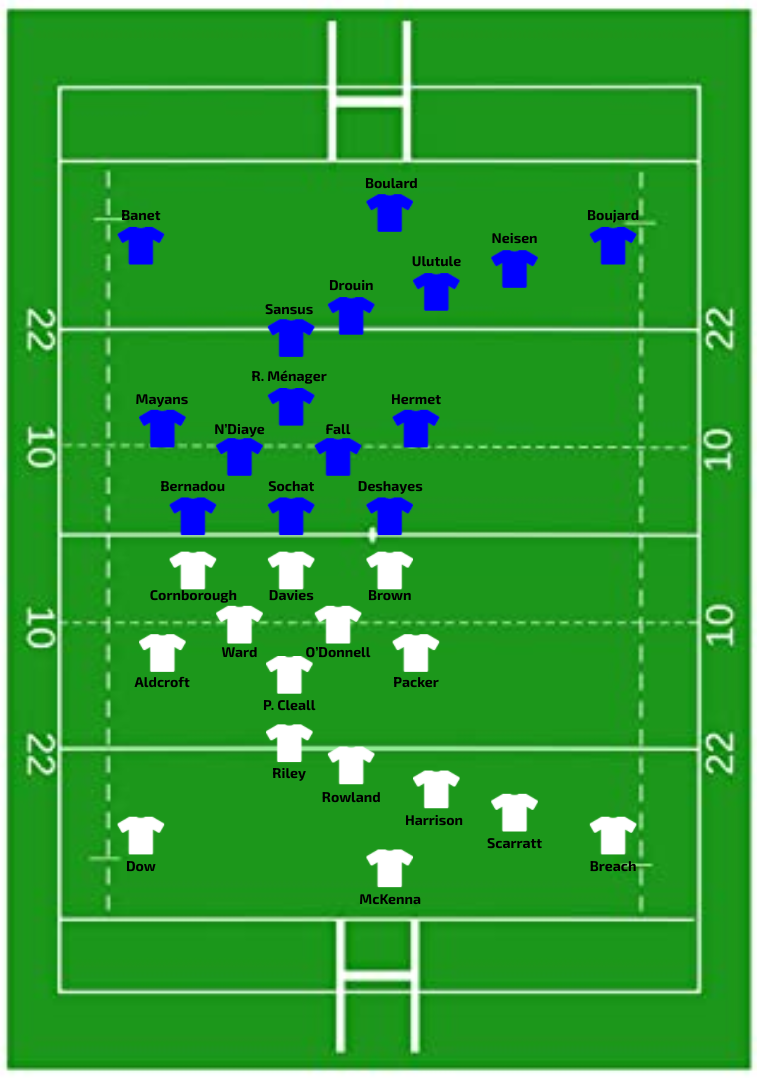

FB	15	Emilie Boulard
RW	14	Cyrielle Banet	(substituted off) 60'
OC	13	Carla Neisen
IC	12	Jade Ulutule
LW	11	Caroline Boujard
FH	10	Caroline Drouin
SH	9	Laure Sansus	(substituted off) 46'
N8	8	Romane Ménager
OF	7	Gaëlle Hermet (c)
BF	6	Marjorie Mayans
RL	5	Safi N'Diaye			(substituted off) 68'
LL	4	Madoussou Fall	38' to 40'		(substituted off) 69'
TP	3	Rose Bernadou	(substituted off) 38'	(substituted on) 69'
HK	2	Agathe Sochat	(substituted off) 50'
LP	1	Annaëlle Deshayes	(substituted off) 68'
Replacements:
HK	16	Laure Touyé	(substituted on) 50'
PR	17	Diha Maïlys Traoré	(substituted on) 68'
PR	18	Clara Joyeux	(substituted on) 38'	(substituted off) 69'
LK	19	Lénaïg Corson	(substituted on) 38'	(substituted off) 40'	(substituted on) 68'
FL	20	Coumba Diallo			(substituted on) 69'
SH	21	Pauline Bourdon	(substituted on) 46'
FH	22	Morgane Peyronnet
FB	23	Jessy Tremouliere	(substituted on) 60'
Coach:
Annick Hayraud

Player of the Match:
Zoe Aldcroft (England)

Touch judges:
Beatrice Benvenuti (Italy)
Maria Pacifico (Italy)
Television match official:
Neil Paterson (Scotland)

== Final classification ==
Position	Nation
1st	England
2nd	France
3rd	Ireland
4th	Italy
5th	Scotland
6th	Wales

== Statistics ==
=== Top points scorers ===
Pos	Name	Team	Pts
1	Emily Scarratt	England	39
2	Caroline Boujard	France	25
3	Helen Nelson	Scotland	22
4	Caroline Drouin	France	20
5	Hannah Tyrrell	Ireland	18
6	Manuela Furlan	Italy	15
7	Pauline Bourdon	France	13
7	Helena Rowland	England	13
9	Michela Sillari	Italy	11
10	Emeline Gros	France	10
10	Abigail Dow	England	10
10	Bryony Cleall	England	10
10	Lark Davies	England	10
10	Beibhinn Parsons	Ireland	10
10	Eimear Considine	Ireland	10
10	Emilie Boulard	France	10
10	Cyrielle Banet	France	10
10	Beatrice Rigoni	Italy	10
10	Dorothy Wall	Ireland	10
10	Cliodhna Moloney	Ireland	10
10	Amee-Leigh Murphy Crowe	Ireland	10
10	Poppy Cleall	England	10
10	Robyn Wilkins	Wales	10

=== Top try scorers ===
Pos	Name	Team	Tries
1	Caroline Boujard	France	5
2	Manuela Furlan	Italy	3
3	Emeline Gros	France	2
3	Abigail Dow	England	2
3	Helena Rowland	England	2
3	Bryony Cleall	England	2
3	Lark Davies	England	2
3	Beibhinn Parsons	Ireland	2
3	Eimear Considine	Ireland	2
3	Emilie Boulard	France	2
3	Cyrielle Banet	France	2
3	Beatrice Rigoni	Italy	2
3	Dorothy Wall	Ireland	2
3	Cliodhna Moloney	Ireland	2
3	Amee-Leigh Murphy Crowe	Ireland	2
3	Poppy Cleall	England	2
