= Jess Taylor-Roberts =

Wales international rugby union footballer

- Born: 10 May 1994 (age 32) Swansea, South Wales
- Height: 1.63 m (5 ft 4 in)
- Weight: 63.18 kg (9 st 13.3 lb)
- School: Amman Valley Comprehensive School
- University: Cardiff Metropolitan University
- Occupation(s): Primary school teacher, rugby player

Rugby union career
- Position: Scrum-half
- Current team: Sale Sharks
Senior career
Years	Team	Apps	(Points)
- Barnsley Ladies RFC
2020–	Sale Sharks		
International career
Years	Team	Apps	(Points)
2021–	Wales	2	
- Correct as of 11 June 2021

Jessica Taylor-Roberts, (née Roberts; born 10 May 1994) is a Welsh Rugby Union player who plays scrum half for the Wales women's national rugby union team and Sale Sharks. She made her debut for the Wales national squad in 2021, representing the team at the 2021 Women's Six Nations Championship.

== Club career ==
Roberts was very accomplished in sports at school, gaining notable achievements in hockey and football before deciding to focus on rugby. She began playing sevens while attending Amman Valley Comprehensive, and then joined the Scarlets under-18s side.

Roberts continued to play rugby while attending Cardiff Metropolitan University, where her team featured in the BUCS Final at Twickenham on two occasions.

Following a move to Barnsley, Roberts then played rugby for Barnsley Ladies for four seasons before signing with Sale Sharks, her current club, in September 2020.

== International career ==
Roberts was picked for the Wales national team after impressing coaches during training with the Sale Sharks. She made her test debut in April 2021 when Wales played France in the first round of the 2021 Women's Six Nations Championship.

She has won two caps in her rugby career to date.

== Personal life ==
As a child, Roberts attended Amman Valley Comprehensive School before studying at Cardiff Metropolitan University, where she graduated in 2015.

Alongside her rugby career, Taylor-Roberts is a primary school teacher at Parkside Primary Academy in Barnsley, where she introduced Welsh to the curriculum.
