= Nicola Howat =

Scotland international rugby union player

- Born: 25 March 1997 (age 29) Melrose, Scotland
- Height: 1.77 m (5 ft 9 1/2 in)
- Weight: 80 kg (180 lb; 12 st 8 lb)

Rugby union career
- Position: Lock
Senior career
Years	Team	Apps	(Points)
2015-2019	Howe of Fife		
2020-present	Sale Sharks		
International career
Years	Team	Apps	(Points)
2018–present	Scotland	7	(0)

Nicola Howat (born 25 March 1997) is a Scottish rugby player from Edinburgh who has played in multiple Women's Six Nations Championships, including the 2021 Women's Six Nations Championship.

== Club career ==
Howat's first club was Howe of Fife’s senior team. She played for them while still at school and continued to play for them after she started at Edinburgh University. Howat was selected as Howe of Fife 2015/16 Player of the Season. In their 2016/17 season, Howat was part of the team won the BT National Division 2 Championship, gaining them promotion to BT National Division 1.

In 2017, she was part of the Edinburgh University team that won the BUCS Championship (British Universities & College Sport) trophy at Twickenham. The team won the league, championship cup and championship 7s all in the same year.

In 2018, she captained the Edinburgh University Ladies Rugby Football Club’s 1st XV.

Since 2020, Nicola has played for Manchester based Sale Sharks, where she plays alongside fellow Scottish international players scrum-half Mhairi Grieveand and back-row Lucy Winter.

In her club career, she started as a back row, but moved into second-row as her main position as she increased her practice.

== International career ==
Howat began her international career by playing for the Scotland U20s against Belgium in 2016. Howat represented Scotland in the U19s, U20s and at Sevens, before joining the Scottish Rugby Union Academy programme in 2017.

She made the starting XV in her first cap for Scotland against France in the 2018 Women's Six Nations under the guidance of coach Shade Munro.

She also played in the 2019 Women's Six Nations Championship.

In the 2021 Women's Six Nations Championship, Howat started on the bench in matches against England, Italy and Wales.

== Personal life ==
Howat started playing rugby in her third year at Bell Baxter High School, which fellow Scottish rugby players Pete Horne and George Horne also attended. She joined local club Howe of Fife Ladies while in her final years of school, in the club's first year.

The Edinburgh University student studied for a Veterinary Medicine degree, completing her studies in 2019.

She started her career as a small animals vet in October 2020. During the pandemic she based herself between Cupar and St Andrews in Fife, training for the 2021 Women's Six Nations Championship and aiding her father with lambing season. In 2021, she relocated to Manchester to play for Sale Sharks.

== Honours ==
- Winner of the 2016/17 British Universities & College Sport (BUCS) Championship with Edinburgh University
- Winner of the 2016/17 BUCS Championship Women's Sevens with Edinburgh University
- Winner of the 2016/17 BUCS Premier North League with Edinburgh University
