= Gwenllian =

Gwenllian (or Gwenllïan) is a Welsh given name, a combination of gwen "fair, blessed, white" and llian "flaxen"). It is most prominently known as the name of two women in medieval Wales who have, for different reasons, become symbols of Welsh patriotism and/or independence.

== Notable people ==
=== Arts and entertainment ===
- Gwenllian Anthony, member of Adwaith
- Gwenllian Gill, actress

=== Athletes ===
- Gwenllian Jenkins, rugby union player
- Gwenllian Pyrs, rugby union player

=== Medieval Wales ===
- Gwenllian ferch Gruffydd (1097–1136) Her patriotic revolt and subsequent death in battle at Kidwelly Castle contributed to the Great Revolt of 1136
- Gwenllian ferch Llywelyn (1282–1337) A daughter of Llywelyn ap Gruffudd, Ein Llyw Olaf, and sister to Catherine his eldest daughter. Owain Glyndŵr was later to adopt the (lions rampant version) arms of Llywelyn on the basis of direct descent via Catherine, Catherine being the heraldic heiress of Llywelyn.

=== Politicians ===
- Gwenllian Lansdown, Plaid Cymru politician
- Gwenllian Morgan, first female mayor in Wales
- Siân Gwenllian, Plaid Cymru politician

== In popular culture ==
Gwenllian is the name of a song by prominent Welsh songwriter Meic Stevens and Anglesey rock band Calfari, based on Gwenllian ferch Gruffydd. It is also the name of the summit Carnedd Gwenllian in the Carneddau, named after Gwenllian ferch Llywelyn.

A character in The Raven Cycle by American author Maggie Stiefvater is named Gwenllian.

== See also ==
- Gwen (given name)
