= Caitlin Lewis =

Wales international rugby union player

- Born: 16 November 1999 (age 26) Wales
- Height: 1.68 m (5 ft 6 in)
- Weight: 65 kg (10 st 3 lb)
- School: Ysgol Dyffryn Aman
- University: Cardiff Metropolitan University

Rugby union career
- Position: Wing
- Current team: Gwalia Lightning
Senior career
Years	Team	Apps	(Points)
- Scarlets
International career
Years	Team	Apps	(Points)
2020–present	Wales	7	
- Correct as of 27 May 2021
National sevens team
Years	Team		Comps
2018-present	Wales		

Caitlin Lewis (born 16 November 1999) is a Welsh Rugby Union player who has international appearances as wing for the Wales women's national rugby union team. She made her debut for the Wales national squad in 2020 against Spain and represented them at the 2021 Women's Six Nations Championship. Lewis now competes in the Celtic Challenge as part of the Gwalia Lightning squad.

== Early career ==
Lewis was born in Ammanford and attended Ysgol Dyffryn Aman. She is currently a student in Cardiff Metropolitan University.

Caitlin began to play rugby at the age of 15 at Ysgol Dyffryn Aman alongside fellow Welsh Player Hannah Jones. Caitlin was involved in the schools' rugby team that won the Rosslyn Park HSBC National School 7s Tournament three years consecutively. Caitlin then became involved with the regional girls set up in Wales playing for Scarlets U18's and Wales 7's U18s. Caitlin represented Wales at the Bahamas 2017 Commonwealth Youth Games in Rugby Sevens winning a bronze medal.

Caitlin began to attend Cardiff Metropolitan University in September 2018 to study BSc Performance Analysis. Caitlin signed to Worcester Warriors and made a couple of appearances at Sixways Stadium. Caitlin has also been a regular face in the Senior Scarlets Women's Squad since turning 18. Whilst studying a MSc in Sports Media and Broadcast at Cardiff Metropolitan University and signed to Exeter Chiefs.

Lewis is a regular face in the Celtic Challenge taking part in the 22/23 23/24 24/25 seasons currently representing Gwalia Lightning.

== Club career ==
Lewis plays rugby for Welsh team Gwalia Lightning in the Celtic Challenge and has been a regular member of the squad in the 23/24 and 24/25 seasons .Caitlin has represented her Welsh region Scarlets for many years pre COVID and has played for teams in the PWR including Worcester Warriors and Exeter Chiefs. Lewis played Super BUCS rugby for her university team at Cardiff Metropolitan.

== International career ==
Lewis represented the Wales under-18s squad at the 2017 Youth Commonwealth Games in the Bahamas, where the team won bronze. She then went on to play for the Wales Women's Development team at the following Dubai sevens invitational tournament.

Lewis made her first start for the Women's Six Nations squad in 2020, and notably scored a last-minute touchdown during the team's 2021 Six Nations match against Scotland.

She has won five caps in her rugby career to date.

== Personal life ==
Lewis attended Amman Valley Comprehensive School before moving to Cardiff Metropolitan University, where she studies sports performance analysis.
