= Siobhan Cattigan =

Scottish rugby union player (1995–2021)

- Born: 11 April 1995 Stirling, Scotland
- Died: 26 November 2021 (aged 26)
- Height: 1.74 m (5 ft 9 in)
- Weight: 83 kg (183 lb; 13 st 1 lb)

Rugby union career
- Position: Blindside Flanker
Amateur team(s)
Years	Team	Apps	(Points)
- Stirling University
Senior career
Years	Team	Apps	(Points)
2014–2021	Stirling County		
International career
Years	Team	Apps	(Points)
2018–2021	Scotland	19	(0)

Siobhan Cattigan (11 April 1995 – 26 November 2021) was a Scottish rugby union player. She represented Scotland in international rugby from 2018 until her death in 2021.

== Club career ==
Cattigan played for Stirling County Ladies. She began playing for the team in 2014, alongside playing for the University of Stirling. She captained the team that won the BUCS league in the 2016–17 season.

Cattigan played inside centre for her University and Stirling County, before moving into the back-row, usually in position 6 or 8, for both club rugby and for Scotland.

== International career ==
Cattigan was invited to join the Scottish Rugby pathway squad in 2017 and was included in the squad that beat Spain in an uncapped fixture in November 2017.

She made her international debut in the 2018 Women's Six Nations Championship in a match between Wales and Scotland, coming off the bench and into blindside flanker. The team lost 18–17, having fought back from being 13–0 down at the break. She was part of the team that saw an away win against Ireland in the 2018 Women's Six Nations Championship – their first away win in 12 years. She toured with the Scottish team in South Africa in 2019, winning against the South African team in Cape Town.

Cattigan was among the Scottish team selected for the 2021 Women's Six Nations Championship and started in the first match against England in position 8, with skipper Rachel Malcolm and Rachel McLachlan either side of her. This decision from coach Bryan Easson, saw her replace Jade Konkel's usual position. He explained his decision "She [Cattigan] played at 8 against Spain a couple of years ago and performed extremely well. Siobhan's always pushed Jade really hard for a starting position anyway, she brings something different."

In total, Cattigan made 19 appearances for Scotland. Her final appearance was in a 2021 Rugby World Cup qualifying match against Spain in September 2021. She did not play in Scotland's November 2021 match against Japan.

== Personal life ==
Cattigan first played rugby at the age of five for McLaren minis in her home town of Callander. The team coach was her father, who was a player at the club. She played the sport from age five until 12, when she started at high school. She then played one season at U15s for Monklands Girls Team, based in Coatbridge but stopped playing rugby for the rest of high school and picked it back up again aged 19 at the University of Stirling.

Cattigan received the War Memorial Prize from her high school in recognition of her charity work for Yorkhill Children's Foundation. She studied criminology and sociology at the University of Stirling and was following this with a masters in sports psychology.

== Death ==
Cattigan died unexpectedly on 26 November 2021. The Daily Telegraph reported that her death was unrelated to COVID-19, contrary to rumours spread on social media by anti-vaccination conspiracy theorists. Her father has said "It had got to the point where she could no longer live with the pain in her head and Siobhan succumbed to an irrational thought and impulsive action."

== Honours ==
Stirling University

- BUCS league: 2016–17
