= Eimear Considine =

- Born: 8 May 1991 (age 35) County Clare, Ireland
- Height: 1.75 m (5 ft 9 in)
- Weight: 70 kg (150 lb; 11 st 0 lb)

Rugby union career
- Position(s): Full Back, wing
Senior career
Years	Team	Apps	(Points)
2016	UL Bohemians		
2017	Munster		
International career
Years	Team	Apps	(Points)
2017–present	Ireland	18	(20)
National sevens team
Years	Team		Comps
2015–2016	Ireland 7s		

Eimear Considine (born 8 May 1991) is an Irish rugby player from Kilmihil, County Clare. She plays for UL Bohemians and Munster and has played at full-back and wing for Ireland women's rugby union team since 2017. She works as a secondary school teacher.

== Club career ==
Considine comes from Kilmihil in County Clare, and was a ladies' Gaelic football and camogie player for her county. She was aged 18 when she won ‘Player of the Match’ in the Ladies Gaelic Football Association All-Ireland Intermediate Championship final in Croke Park in 2009.

She did not take up rugby until she was 23, when she moved to Dublin in 2014 to start teaching. She was initially recruited by the Ireland women's national rugby sevens (2013) and was part of their team's bid to qualify for the 2016 Olympics.

She joined Limerick club UL Bohemians in 2016 and won an All-Ireland league title with them in 2017.

== International career ==
=== Sevens ===
Considine played for the Ireland women's sevens team from 2013 to 2016. She made her competitive Sevens debut in June 2015 at Rugby Europe Women's Sevens Grand Prix Series in Kazan and was in the Irish squad for the HSBC World Rugby Sevens Series 2015–2016 in Dubai and São Paulo.

=== Fifteens ===
Considine got her first Irish cap, as a replacement against Scotland, in the 2017 Women's Six Nations Championship, after playing just three and a half games of VXs rugby. She also played for Ireland's national team before she played for her club UL Bohemians. She was a member of Ireland's team for the 2017 Women's Rugby World Cup. In 2018, she took a year off sport in 2018 to travel abroad.

Considine was originally a winger, but was given the full-back role for Ireland in the 2020 and 2021 Women's Six Nations. She scored two tries in Ireland's 2021 Women's Six Nations opening round 45–0 defeat of Wales.

== Personal life ==
Considine graduated with a degree in PE and Irish from the University of Limerick (2008–2012).

Before she concentrated on rugby, she was a dual player in Gaelic games. In 2008, she played for Clare in four All-Ireland finals - minor finals in camogie and ladies Gaelic football and Intermediate ladies' football final plus an All-Ireland club camogie final with Kilmaley. In 2009, she won an All-Ireland Intermediate football title with Clare and was nominated for an LGFA Allstar.

Considine teaches PE and Irish in Dublin and is a fluent in Irish. She was a pundit on Eirsport TV's coverage of the 2019 World Cup and, in November 2020, was part of TG4 television's first all-female analysis team for a Pro14 game. She is also one of the presenters of the "House of Rugby" podcast.

In 2020, speaking as an ambassador for Rugby Players Ireland 'Tackle Your Feelings' campaign to promote mental wellbeing in schools, Considine revealed a family tragedy. Her father had a heart attack and died after a family walk when she was just 14.

Considine's sister, Ailish, also played for Clare in camogie and ladies football. In 2019, she was the first Irishwoman to win a Premiership medal in the AFLW in Australia, with Adelaide Crows.
