= Christine Belisle =

Canadian-born Scottish rugby union player

- Born: 4 November 1993 (age 33) Peterborough, Ontario, Canada
- Height: 175 cm (5 ft 9 in)
- Weight: 90 kg (198 lb)

Rugby union career
- Position: Tighthead prop
Senior career
Years	Team	Apps	(Points)
2016-2020	Cartha Queens Park		(0)
2021-present	Loughborough Lightning		(0)
International career
Years	Team	Apps	(Points)
2019–present	Scotland	42	(5)

Christine Belisle (born 4 November 1993) is a Canadian born Scottish rugby player from Ontario who has played in multiple Women's Six Nations Championships for Scotland, since obtaining residency in 2015, including the 2021 Women's Six Nations Championship.

== Club career ==
In Canada, Belisle played for local club side Peterborough Pagans before going travelling took her to Scotland in 2015.

After relocating to Glasgow, she began playing rugby again in 2016 for a local club Cartha Queens Park. In her first seasons there, she mostly played in position eight for the club. It was the club coach who spotted her international potential and sent her for national tryouts. She moved from the Scottish Premiership to the Allianz English Premiership in 2021, playing tighthead for Loughborough Lightning.

== International career ==
Belisle's coach suggested to national coach Shade Monro that she should be considered to play for the Scotland in 2018 when she became eligible to represent the country. She was selected via the Scottish Qualification Programme. However, injury prevented her from training with the squad properly until 2019.

She was selected in 2019 to be part of the squad in position eight travelling to South Africa and received her first cap in the first Test match of the tour under supervision of coach Philip Doyle.

In early 2020 she was selected as a replacement for an away game against Spain in which the Scots won 36–12.

Having played internationally in the back-row/second-row several times, for the 2020 Women's Six Nations Championship she joined the combative front-row in tighthead prop in a match against France played in October 2020. During the match she came off the bench and won a scrum penalty in her new position.

In the 2021 Women's Six Nations Championship she continued to play in front-row tighthead prop position in jersey number three, with her first start in the position in Scotland's opening match against England. In the team's victory against Wales in their closing match of the championship she scored before the break to give the hosts a 17–6 lead.

In 2022, she made Scotland's squad for the delayed 2021 Rugby World Cup that was held in New Zealand.

She was named in Scotland's squad for the 2025 Six Nations Championship. She featured in the first match against Wales from off the bench but later left the squad due to personal reasons. In May 2025, she announced her retirement from international rugby after she missed out on the initial training squad for the 2025 Women's Rugby World Cup in England. Then in September later that year, she was called back into the squad ahead of their quarter-final match against England as an injury replacement for Elliann Clarke.

== Personal life ==
Canadian-born Belisle focused on figure skating and synchronised skating until she discovered her talent for rugby at the age of 15 at Thomas A. Stewart Secondary School in Peterborough, Ontario. She then played under the guidance of coach Craig Harris all through the rest of her schooling.

She says of the transition to the sport, "I soon found out that there is no community quite like a rugby community – I was tall and had an athletic build and suddenly I had found a place where I could use my strength and it just seemed the perfect fit for me."

Following her High School graduation, she played one more season with her squad before going travelling in Canada and in Europe. Falling in love with Glasgow, she decided to move to the city in 2015.

Belisle is a qualified personal trainer and runs her own business called the Strong Friends Club, which focuses on celebrating strength over physique.
