= Teleri Wyn Davies =

Wales international rugby union footballer

- Born: 10 May 1997 (age 29) Bodelwyddan, North Wales
- Height: 1.80 m (5 ft 11 in)
- Weight: 90 kg (14 st 2 lb)
- School: Ysgol Y Berwyn
- University: University of Chester; Bangor University
- Occupation(s): Solicitor, rugby player

Rugby union career
- Position: Second row
- Current team: Sale Sharks
Senior career
Years	Team	Apps	(Points)
2020-present	Sale Sharks		
2018-2020	RGC		
2016-2020	Caernarfon RUFC		
International career
Years	Team	Apps	(Points)
2018–present	Wales		
- Correct as of 02 June 2021

Teleri Wyn Davies (born 7 May 1997) is a Welsh Rugby Union player who plays second row for the Wales women's national rugby union team and Sale Sharks. She made her debut for the Wales national squad in 2018 and represented them at the 2021 Women's Six Nations Championship.

== Club career ==
Davies began playing rugby when she was five years old with Bala RFC Juniors, where she established and coached a girls' team until her teenage years. Davies holds a level 2 rugby coaching certificate and level 1 refereeing award.

She went on to play for Nant Conwy under-18s, Scarlets under-18s, Caernarfon RUFC and then RGC before signing with Sale Sharks in 2020.

== International career ==
Davies earned herself a national call-up after impressing coaches during an RGC match against the Scarlets. She made her international debut in a winning match against Scotland in 2018, but then had to wait until the opening game of the revamped Six Nations Championship in 2021 to earn her second cap, against France.

Davies has won four caps in her rugby career to date.

== Personal life ==
As a child, Davies attended Ysgol Bro Tegid and Ysgol Y Berwyn, Y Bala, before studying law at Bangor University where she graduated with a first class degree. After completing the Legal Practice Course (LPC) at the University of Chester in 2019, she joined Gamlins LLP in Llandudno, where she works as a solicitor alongside her rugby career.

Davies' father was rugby player Bryan 'Yogi' Davies, who was paralysed from the neck down after a scrum collapsed as he captained Bala RUFC against Nant Conwy in what was to be his retirement game in April 2007. He died as a result of his injury in 2013.

Davies admits she held a "grudge" against the sport following her father's injury, but after a heart-to-heart prior to his death decided to return to rugby in his honour. In an interview, Davies said: "I feel closest to my dad when I’m playing rugby."

Davies also plays the piano and the harp in her free time. She is a fluent Welsh speaker.
