= Stirling University RFC =

Scottish rugby union club

- Full name: Stirling University Rugby Football Club
- Founded: 1967
- Location: Stirling, Scotland
- League(s): Men: Caledonia Midlands Non-League; Women: Scottish Womens Non-League
- 2024–25: Men: Caledonia Midlands Non-League; Women: Scottish Womens Non-League
Team kit

Official website
- www.facebook.com/SUWRFC/

Union website
- www.pitchero.com/clubs/stirlinguniversityrfc2

Stirling University RFC is a rugby union club based in Stirling, Scotland. The club operates a men's team and a women's team. Both currently play in the university leagues.

== History ==
The club was founded in 1967. The club announced a partnership with Super 6 side Stirling Wolves in 2019.

Cathy Gallagher, the University of Stirling Executive Director of Sport, who also has a place on the Stirling County board, stated:

This is an extremely exciting opportunity for the University, placing us at the top table of an ambitious new venture in Scottish sport. The partnership has so much room to grow and we look forward to working with Stirling County to unlock the franchise’s potential and take the sport of rugby to a new level in the Caledonia region, as well as adding to the sporting prowess and aspirations of the city of Stirling.

Stirling University now offer rugby union scholarships to students.

== Sides ==
The men's team has a 1st and 2nd XV.

Both men and women train at the Rubber Crumb 3G pitch at Stirling University.

Men's training is on Monday nights 8.30-10 pm, Tuesday 2-4 pm, and Friday 3–4.30 pm. In addition they have a gym session at Stirling County RFC on Monday mornings between 8 and 9 am.

Women's training is on Monday afternoons 4–5.30 pm and Thursday afternoons 4-6 pm. In addition they have a gym session on Tuesday afternoons between 4.30-5.30 pm.

== Sevens ==
The club run the Stirling University Sevens tournament.

== Honours ==
=== Men ===
- Scottish Conference 1A
  - Champions (3): 2006–07, 2008–09, 2017–18
- Scottish Conference 2A
  - Champions (1): 2015–16
- McLaren HSFP Sevens
  - Champions (1): 1995

=== Women ===
- Scottish Conference 1A
  - Champions (3): 2010–11, 2016–17, 2019–20
- Scottish University Sevens
  - Champions: 2022

== Notable former players ==
=== Men ===
==== Canada ====
The following former Stirling University RFC players have represented Canada at senior international level.

- (Canada) Gordon McRorie

=== Women ===
==== Scotland ====
The following former Stirling University RFC players have represented Scotland at senior international level.

- (Scotland) Siobhan Cattigan
