= Evie Wills =

Scotland international rugby union player

- Born: 4 February 2001 (age 25) Stirling, Scotland
- Height: 163 cm (5 ft 4 in)
- Weight: 75 kg (165 lb; 11 st 11 lb)

Rugby union career
- Position: Fly-half
Amateur team(s)
Years	Team	Apps	(Points)
2016–2019	Stirling County		
Senior career
Years	Team	Apps	(Points)
2023–2025	Leicester Tigers		
2025–	Sale Sharks		
International career
Years	Team	Apps	(Points)
2021–	Scotland	8	(5)
National sevens team
Years	Team		Comps
2018–2022	Scotland 7s		

Evie Wills (born 4 February 2001) is a Scottish rugby player from Stirling. She first played for Scotland in the 2021 Women's Six Nations Championship. She also competed for the side at the delayed 2021 Rugby World Cup.

== Club career ==
Wills has played for Stirling County since she was seven, moving to the women's team in 2019, playing alongside her friend Evie Gallagher since a young age at the club. She plays as a stand-off/centre for the club.

She joined Sale Sharks for the 2025–26 season.

== International career ==
Wills first began playing rugby for Scotland, at 16 years old, when she played in the Scotland Seniors East v West tournament. She was selected to play in the Scotland U20s match against Northumbria; this was followed by an invitation to play in the U18s National 7s tournament in July.

In 2018 she played for the Scotland 7s, playing in the third leg of the Rugby Grand Prix in Kazan - the youngest in the squad by five years. Evie played against Russia and Portugal during the championships. Scotland came third in the tournament, losing to Russia and France.

She also played in the Scotland U18s 7s from 2018 and 2019.

In the 2021 Women's Six Nations Championship, she was the replacement in the match against Italy and gained her first cap coming off the bench at the match in Scotstoun in Glasgow. She was named as a substitute in Scotland's last match against Wales, which the Scottish team won 27–20. Coach Bryan Easson said of his decision to include Wills in the squad, "Evie Wills is a good distributor off left and right hand." In the weeks ahead of the match she was coached in her kicking by Scotland cap centurion Chris Paterson.

In 2022, she was selected in Scotland's squad for the Rugby World Cup in New Zealand.

Wills was ruled out of action for the 2023–24 season due to an ACL injury. She was named in Scotland's extended training squad ahead of the 2025 Women's Six Nations Championship. She was also selected in the Scottish side for the Women's Rugby World Cup.

== Personal life ==
Wills attended the Dollar Academy and started rugby at the age of seven through her local club Stirling County. She took time out from her nursing degree at Glasgow Caledonian University in the lead-up to the Rugby World Cup in 2022, but returned to complete it in May 2023.
