= Hannah Smith (rugby union) =

Scotland international rugby union player

- Born: 30 October 1992 (age 34) Falkirk, Scotland
- Height: 1.73 m (5 ft 8 in)
- Weight: 78 kg (172 lb)

Rugby union career
- Position: Centre
Senior career
Years	Team	Apps	(Points)
2011-2018	Hillhead Jordan RFC		
2019-present	Watsonians		
International career
Years	Team	Apps	(Points)
2013–2022	Scotland	37	(30)

Hannah Smith (born 30 October 1992) born in Falkirk, Scotland. Smith has represented her country in both rugby and Touch. Since 2013, she has played in multiple Women's Six Nations Championships, including the 2021 Women's Six Nations Championship. She was selected for the postponed 2020 Tokyo Olympics Team GB Rugby Sevens.

Smith announced her retirement from international rugby at the end of 2022.

== Club rugby career ==
Since 2019, Smith has played for Tennent's Premiership side Watsonians.

In 2011, she joined Hillhead Jordanhill RFC. In 2017, the team won the Sarah Beaney Cup. Smith was named BT Women's Premier League Player of the Season for her performances during the tournament. She scored the winning try of the final against Murrayfield Wanderers, also winning player of the match for the final.

The team went on to win the Sarah Beaney Cup Final against Watsonians in 2018, with Smith securing player of the match following multiple tries.

== International rugby career ==
Hannah made her full international debut for Scotland against France in the 2013 Six Nations and has played internationally for Scotland regularly since then.

She was selected for the Scotland Women 7s squad ahead of the 2017 Rugby Europe Women's Sevens Trophy. During the series, Scotland defeated Ireland 26-14 and Smith finished top of the DHL Performance Tracker for the tournament.

In the 2020 Women's Six Nations Championship, she played in Scotland's opening match against Ireland but was forced to withdraw for the following matches due to a shoulder injury.

She was part of the squad for the 2021 Women's Six Nations Championship, and scored Scotland's try in the defeat to England; its first try against England in three years. However, she did not play in all the subsequent matches in order to continue her training for the GB Sevens team for the postponed 2020 Tokyo Olympics .

In an interview with Sky Sports in April 2021, she spoke of the GB team's disappointment at the postponement of the championship, when interviewed about their disrupted training regime.

Smith announced her retirement from international rugby after the delayed 2021 Rugby World Cup in New Zealand.

== Personal life ==
Smith is a veterinary surgeon. With the support of Scottish Rugby, she took a sabbatical to focus on rugby in the run-up to the Tokyo Olympic Games: “I was struggling to balance my work and rugby – it was becoming too much – and Scottish Rugby luckily were me out and get me off work because I was starting to struggle training at a high level."

Smith began playing rugby at the age of 17 at Stirling County – the same club as her brother Matt, a former Glasgow Warriors and Scotland U20 player.

== Honours ==
- BT Women’s Premier League Player of the Season 2017
