= Manon Johnes =

Wales international rugby union footballer

- Born: 17 December 2000 (age 25) Cardiff, South Wales
- Height: 1.7 m (5.6 ft)
- Weight: 70.91 kg (11.166 st)
- School: Ysgol Gyfun Gymraeg Glantaf
- University: Oxford University

Rugby union career
- Position: Back row
- Current team: Bristol Bears
Senior career
Years	Team	Apps	(Points)
2020–present	Bristol Bears		
–	Cardiff Blues		
International career
Years	Team	Apps	(Points)
2018–present	Wales	14	(0)
- Correct as of 28 June 2025

Manon Johnes (born 17 December 2000) is a Welsh Rugby Union professional player who plays back row for the Wales women's national rugby union team and Bristol Bears. She made her debut for the Wales national squad in 2018, and represented them at the 2021 Women's Six Nations Championship.

== Club career ==
Johnes first began playing rugby at the age of six, after developing an interest in the sport by watching matches with her father. She started out as the only girl on the team at CRICC Caerdydd, the junior section of Cardiff Quins. At 13, she moved to Cardiff Quins Girls, before joining the Cardiff Blues under-18s, and later the Cardiff Blues senior squad.

Johnes signed with Bristol Bears in 2020 and stayed with them until 2023. Between 2024-2025 Johnes had played in New Zealand for the University of Canterbury and the Canterbury region in the Farah Palmer cup. Johnes signed for Ealing Trailfinders at the beginning of the 2025/2026 season.

== International career ==
Johnes had already established an international career before signing with the Wales senior women's squad. In 2017, she was part of the women's under-18s rugby sevens team that represented Wales and won bronze at the Youth Commonwealth Games in the Bahamas. She would later represent Wales in senior sevens at the 2018 Commonwealth Games in Australia.

She made her debut for Wales against South Africa in 2018 in the autumn series held at Cardiff Arms Park. Wales' 19–5 victory saw Johnes earn her first cap aged just 17.

Johnes then made her Six Nations debut in 2019, with four appearances during the tournament. She has represented Wales at each subsequent Women's Six Nations Championship, and was named 'One to Watch' by BBC Sport ahead of the event in 2021.

Johnes has won 14 caps to date in her rugby career.

== Personal life ==
Johnes attended Welsh language school Ysgol Gyfun Gymraeg Glantaf in Cardiff before taking a place at Oxford University's St Catherine's College in 2020 to study Geography. In an interview with Oxford University Rugby Club, where she plays during her studies, she explained: "I made a deferred entry to university as I wanted to take a year to balance sports commitments with working in my community, teaching in a Welsh medium primary school and working with ALN pupils."

During the coronavirus pandemic, Johnes would also spend her free time working as an assistant teacher at Ysgol Gwaelod y Garth, on the outskirts of Cardiff.

Johnes says that one the most influential people in her life is her former PE teacher and Wales footballer Gwennan Harries. In an interview with WRU.Wales, she said: "[Harries] has been an immense role model for me, my biggest influence without a doubt. In school it would normally just be the academy boys working out in the gym, but she got me going in there in the mornings, getting into good habits. I’m still in contact with her on a weekly basis, and she’s more of a friend than a teacher now.”

== Honours ==
- 2017 Youth Commonwealth Bronze medallist.
- Cardiff Blues Women Player of the Year 2017/2018/2019.
