= Rachel McLachlan =

Scotland international rugby union player

- Born: 26 February 1999 (age 27) Edinburgh, Scotland
- Height: 163 cm (5 ft 4 in)
- Weight: 68 kg (150 lb)

Rugby union career
- Position: Blindside Flanker
Senior career
Years	Team	Apps	(Points)
2017–2018	GCU		(0)
2017–2018	West of Scotland		(0)
2018–2019	Stirling County		(0)
2019–2020	DMP Sharks		(0)
	Montpellier		(0)
International career
Years	Team	Apps	(Points)
2018–	Scotland	57	(10)

Rachel McLachlan (born 26 February 1999) is a Scottish rugby player from Edinburgh and 2015 U18 and U21 Scottish Judo Champion. Within nine months of starting rugby, she was asked to join the Scottish team. She played in the 2018, 2019 and 2021 Women's Six Nations Championship.

== Club career ==
McLachlan played for West of Scotland FC before making the move to Stirling County in 2018.

Her first club was the Glasgow Caledonian University Women's team, with whom she played for two seasons, while also playing for West Of Scotland Rugby Club. This was followed by a season with Stirling County and a move to Darlington Mowden Park Rugby Club (DMP Sharks) in September 2019.

She has consistently played Openside Flanker for these clubs, as well as for the Scottish Women's team.

== International career ==
McLachlan received her first cap for Scotland in the 7s in Paris against Poland and Russia, running on pitch at sixty minutes. This was nine months after trying the game for the first time with Glasgow Caledonian University. She was selected for the PDP [Performance Development Programme] with Scottish Rugby to support her progress and holds 3 caps for the 7s.

Her first XVs cap came in 2018 against Italy away, where she came off the bench. Four weeks later, when Scotland played Canada at Scotstoun Stadium, McLachlan was in the starting XV. Coach Shade Munro said of the decision to start her on the pitch in the match, just a year after she had started playing the sport, "She's an out-and-out natural 7. She's aggressive, she's dynamic, she's fit. She doesn't know the game that well, but she definitely deserves the opportunity to start."

Part of the squad for the 2021 Women's Six Nations Championship, Scotland captain, Rachel Malcolm, said of her teammate McLachlan, "She's still so young and I would describe her as a bit of a terrier, very annoying to play against and always at 100 percent in training and in matches. She is someone who plays with her heart on her sleeve and gives it absolutely everything while she's on that pitch." The team lost to England and Italy, before beating Wales 27–20 to claim fifth place in the championship.

She was named in Scotland's squad for the 2025 Six Nations Championship. She also made the Scottish side for the Women's Rugby World Cup in England.

== Personal life ==
Born and raised in Edinburgh, McLachlan attended South Morningside Primary School and Boroughmuir High School, before studying physiotherapy at Glasgow Caledonian University. She began playing rugby at 18, when she started at Glasgow Caledonian University.

A former Scottish Judo Champion and Sainsbury's School games Judo Champion, having done the sport since she was seven, practising alongside Olympic silver medallist Gemma Gibbons. During this time, she trained with the national judo squad at Ratho. She sees the crossover between the two sports with the physical contact and fast strategic decisions involved and believes her background in the sport helped her progress rapidly with rugby. It was the team aspect of rugby that attracted her when she switched her loyalties between the two sports. She commented on the comparisons between the two sports, "Rugby is similar [to judo] – you are given short bursts of energy in breakdowns – although the 80 minutes was difficult at first. But I think I've got round that now."

She has commented on the changing nature of the game, which is increasingly attracting female players and believes it is "One of the most inclusive sports out there."

== Honours ==
- Under 21 Scottish Judo Champion 2017
- Sainsbury's School Games Judo Champion 2015
- Friends of Scottish Rugby Trophy Winner 2019
