= Evie Gallagher =

Scotland international rugby union player

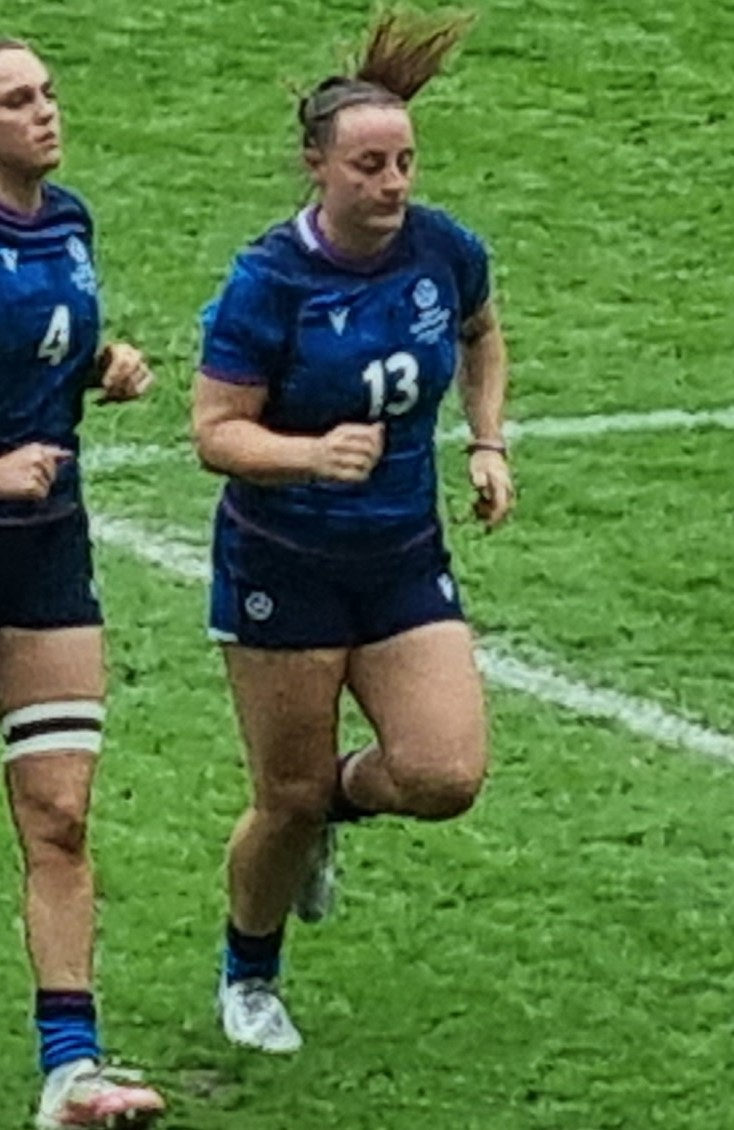
- Gallagher at the 2022 Commonwealth Games
- Born: 22 August 2000 (age 26) Stirling, Scotland
- Height: 1.67 m (5 ft 6 in)
- Weight: 79 kg (174 lb)

Rugby union career
- Position: Number 8
Senior career
Years	Team	Apps	(Points)
2015-2022	Stirling County		
2022-2023	Worcester Warriors		
2023-present	Bristol Bears		
International career
Years	Team	Apps	(Points)
2021–present	Scotland	42	(45)

Evie Gallagher (born 22 August 2000) is a Scottish rugby player from Stirling who made her debut as an international player in the 2021 Women's Six Nations Championship at the age of 20.

== Club career ==
Gallagher played for Stirling County, her local team, which she has played for since she joined the minis at the club. Her club coach, Al Wilson, says of the player, "Evie is a natural athlete. When she played in the minis at the club, she played on the wing because she was so quick with her step. In the under-15 team, she played mainly at centre before the transition started to the back-row when she was in the under-18s."

Through Stirling County under-18s team, she celebrated two back-to-back victories in Girls Club Cup Finals at BT Murrayfield Stadium in 2017 and 2018, with Gallagher scoring in the second encounter.

Gallagher then played for the University of Edinburgh for two seasons. She was among the winning team that beat Northumbria in the BUCS Women's Championship Final of 2018. They also won the Scottish Varsity match against St Andrews in 2018 with a score of 49–0. During the match, Gallagher scored a hat-trick of tries.

After finishing her studies, Gallagher returned to Stirling County to continue playing for the local club. She was one of two Stirling County players selected for the Scottish team in the 2021 Women's Six Nations Championship - the other being Megan Kennedy.

In 2022 Gallagher was signed by Worcester Warriors. After Worcester left the Women's Premiership in 2023, Gallagher was signed to play for Bristol Bears

== International career ==
Gallagher has represented Scotland at U18 7s and Scotland U19 level.

Gallagher featured in the Scotland 7s team that was victorious after winning all eight games at the 2018 Amsterdam 7s under coach Scott Forrest.

Under Forrest, she went on to play for the Rugby Europe Grand Prix two-day event in Marcoussis, Paris. She says of the experience, "It was scary at first out there because the speed and level was like nothing I had been part of before, but then I just started to enjoy it and as a squad I think we settled into things a bit on the second day."

In the 2021 Women's Six Nations Championship, Scotland Coach Bryan Easson named Gallagher among the Scotland squad to play in back-row. He said of his decision to include Gallagher, "Evie Gallagher used to play in the midfield when she was younger. I say younger she is only 20 now! She has good distribution and is an exciting prospect."

She made her Six Nations debut after coming off the bench against England at half-time in 2021. She then made her first start in the game against Italy, replacing Rachel Malcolm in the back row. She then scored her first international try in Scotland's closing match against Wales, which they won 27–20.

She was named in Scotland's squad for the 2025 Six Nations Championship in March. She was also selected in the Scottish side for the Women's Rugby World Cup in England.

== Personal life ==
Growing up, Gallagher took part in a number of sports including basketball, eventing and horse riding. Gallagher, a former student of Stirling High School, first started playing rugby through attending mini rugby sessions with her local club, Stirling County, alongside boys her age. She says of the experience, "Playing with and against the boys at a young age is what made the difference for me because they were really competitive and it made me competitive." Her mother first introduced her to the game through sports-based summer camps, which was when she discovered a passion for the game.

She studied ecological and environmental science at the University of Edinburgh and is currently studying towards an HND in Animal Care at Scotland's Rural College (SRUC).
