= Bryony Cleall =

England international rugby union player

- Born: 12 June 1992 (age 34) Norwich, Norfolk, England
- Height: 183 cm (6 ft 0 in)
- Weight: 108 kg (17 st 0 lb)
- Notable relative: Poppy Cleall (twin sister)

Rugby union career
- Position: Prop Occasionally back row
- Current team: Saracens Women
Senior career
| Years | Team | Apps | (Points) |
| 2015–2016 | Bristol | | |
| 2016–2021 | Saracens | 55 | (195) |
| 2021–2022 | Wasps | 11 | (17) |
| 2022–2024 | Harlequins | 17 | (50) |
| 2024- | Saracens | | |
International career
| Years | Team | Apps | (Points) |
| 2019– | England | 7 | (15) |

Bryony Antonia Cleall (born 12 June 1992) is an English rugby union player. She plays for Saracens Women at club level and is a member of the England Women's Rugby Team, having earned her first cap in the 2019 Women's Six Nations.

== International career ==
She made her England debut against Ireland in the 2019 Women’s Six Nations when she came on as a replacement and scored a try.

On the strength of this, and her performance at Saracens, she was awarded a professional contract for the 2019/20 season. One week after her England debut, Cleall broke her leg, which meant a lengthy gap between her first and second cap her country.

Her second appearance for England came in the 2021 Women's Six Nations Championship, where she scored a try in the opening match.

== Club career ==
Cleall currently plays for Saracens women’s team, alongside her twin sister and England teammate, Poppy Cleall. She left Saracens to play for Wasps women. While at Saracens, Cleall was awarded the club’s Supporters’ Player of the Year award for the 2017/18 season whilst winning back to back Tyrrells Premier 15s title.

On 27 February 2024, Harlequins announced she had been released from her contract with the club by mutual agreement. Shortly afterwards, she was re-signed by Saracens.

== Injuries ==
Cleall's career has been blighted by several major injuries and illnesses. At 17, she suffered a serious knee injury while preparing for the England U20s trials. She underwent four knee operations for a torn anterior cruciate ligament, which kept her from playing rugby for five years.

When she was added to the starting line up for the 2021 Six Nations side, she found it hard to believe as injuries had meant it had been a long time coming. She said, “I did have to ask if it was an April fools because the team came out on 1 April. I couldn't even put my feelings into words.”

== Early life and education ==
Born in Norwich, she attended Burgate School and Sixth Form in Hampshire and went on to study Sports Science and Geography at Loughborough University.

She and Poppy first played rugby at an after-school club aged seven. She went on to play at Ellingham and Ringwood RFC, as well as Salisbury, Wimborne and Bristol Bears.

She returned to the game in 2015 when she started a Masters at Exeter University (gaining a PGCE in Physical Education and an MSc in Educational research), where she played under former England scrum-half and captain Jo Yapp.

Cleall is a Director of Rugby at Harris City Academy Crystal Palace. She also created the first girls state school rugby academy in partnership with her club, Saracens.
