= Megan Kennedy =

- Born: 3 July 1997 (age 29) Stirling, Scotland
- Height: 1.7 m (5 ft 7 in)
- Weight: 87 kg (192 lb; 13 st 10 lb)

Rugby union career
- Position: Tighthead prop
Senior career
Years	Team	Apps	(Points)
2011-present	Stirling County		
International career
Years	Team	Apps	(Points)
2018–present	Scotland	18	(0)

Megan Kennedy (born 3 July 1996) is a Scottish rugby player from Stirling who played in the 2021 Women's Six Nations Championship. She has played international rugby for Scotland since 2018. She is the Sponsorship Co-Ordinator at Glasgow Warriors.

== Club career ==
Kennedy plays for Stirling County Ladies. She began playing for their junior teams when she was 14 years old with the U15 side. Aged 16, she played for the U18 team and was supported by Scottish Rugby Pathway programme.

== International career ==
Kennedy is a Scottish Rugby contracted 2021 player.

She joined the XVs Scotland squad for the 2018 Women's Six Nations Championship, in the match where Scotland lost by one point to Wales. The invitation to play for the national team followed two years of recuperation as the result of a knee injury.

Prior to this, she played in an uncapped international match versus Spain in November 2017. She was part of the squad that played Canada in 2018, at the time the fourth best team in the world, in which Scotland was narrowly defeated 25–28, in a match that was seen as a step change in the team's progress.

In 2019, she was one of the Scottish team selected for a tour of South Africa - their first ever matches in the Southern hemisphere - in which they beat the South African national Springbok Women squad 5-47. In the match, Kennedy started on the bench and was brought in after 53 minutes.

She was also part of the 2020 Women's Six Nations Championship, in which multiple fixtures were disrupted due to COVID-19.

Kennedy was among the Scottish team for the 2021 Women's Six Nations Championship and started in the first match against England. After sustaining a shoulder injury during the match, she missed the next two matches but was back for team's match against Italy. Coach Bryan Easson commented on his decision to bring her into the Italy game for a 17th cap, “Megan has performed really well in the games she’s played previously... around the field she is good in defence and at lineout/maul time. Having that experience at three makes a big difference. She’s a very good scrummager." She replaced Christine Beleisle as tight-head in the game.

In the team's final match against Wales she was one of the players who scored before the break, giving the team a 17–6 lead, which ultimately led to a 27–20 victory, securing Scotland's fifth position in the championship.

== Personal life ==
Kennedy first played rugby aged 14. She attended Alva Academy, before going to Stirling University to study Sports Journalism (Honours degree), followed by a Sports Psychology master's degree.

Her mother Fiona previously played hockey and volleyball at a national level and her father Gregor is a former County player, while brother Reyner continues to play for Stirling County.

== Business career ==
She is now the Sponsorship Co-Ordinator at Glasgow Warriors.
