= Poppy Cleall =

England international rugby union player

- Born: 12 June 1992 (age 34) Norwich, Norfolk, England
- Height: 181 cm (5 ft 11 in)
- Weight: 96 kg (15 st 2 lb)
- Notable relative: Bryony Cleall (twin sister)

Rugby union career
- Position: Flanker / Lock / Number 8
- Current team: Saracens Women
Senior career
Years	Team	Apps	(Points)
2010–2013, 2015–2016	Bristol		
2013–2015, 2016–	Saracens	121	
International career
Years	Team	Apps	(Points)
2011–2013	England U20s		
2016–	England	65	(110)
Medal record
Representing England
Women's rugby union
Rugby World Cup
Silver medal – second place	2021 New Zealand	Team competition
Silver medal – second place	2017 Ireland	Team competition

Poppy Georgia Cleall (born 12 June 1992) is an English rugby union player. She also plays for Saracens Women at club level. She is the 2021 Six Nations Player of the Year, England Player of the year and the leading all time Premiership try scorer. She was nominated for World Player of the Year in 2021. She has won 5 Grand Slams and 4 Premiership Titles with Saracens.

== International career ==
Cleall made her England debut at the 2016 Women's Six Nations Championship. In 2017 she featured in every game of the 2017 Six Nations in which England won the Grand Slam.

The same year, she was selected for the 2017 Women's Rugby World Cup team as an injury replacement; England reached the final of the tournament.

The following year she again played for England's 2018 Six Nations team, switching between flanker, No. 8 and second row.

Her Six Nations career continued in 2019 when she scored four tries for her country, representing in each of England's games. She was offered a professional contract with the England team in 2019, and played in the 2019 Super Series in San Diego that summer.

Cleall scored a hat trick in England's 66-7 win over Wales in the 2020 Women's Six Nations Championship, and was named player of the match in England's opening game against Scotland. She was also named the Six Nations Player of the Championship.

She captained England for the first time in a record win v New Zealand at Franklin’s Gardens. She went on to captain the side again in the 2022 Six Nations, for a game v Italy. England won the grand slam and Cleall won her fifth title. She was named in the England squad for the delayed 2021 Rugby World Cup held in New Zealand in October and November 2022.

== Club career ==
Cleall signed for Bristol Ladies in 2010 and moved to Saracens Women from 2012 to 2016.

She returned to Bristol for the 2016/17 season but rejoined Saracens in 2017, where she continues to play.

During her time at Saracens, Cleall has achieved three back to back Women's Premiership titles. She was named Player of the Match in the 2019 final.

She was named Player of the Match in the 21/22 season semis final as Saracens beat Quins. They won the title after defeating Exeter Chiefs in the final.

== Honours ==
Awarded an Honorary doctorate of Arts from Bournemouth University for her work in women’s rugby and founded the Women’s Rugby Agency.

2022- Women’s Rugby World Cup Finalist

2021 - Six Nations Player of the Championship

2021 - Nominated for World Player of the Year

2021- England Player of the Year

2021- World Rugby Dream Team of the Year

2017 - Women's Rugby World Cup finalist

== Early life and education ==
Cleall started playing rugby aged six; growing up, she played for Ellingham and Ringwood, Wimborne and Salisbury RFCs.

Her twin sister, Bryony Cleall, also plays rugby for England and Saracens Women.

In 2020, Cleall founded the Women's Rugby Agency to encourage more girls to join the sport. She also co-founded a tuck shop for the England team during the 2021 with teammate Hannah Botterman, providing door-to-door snacks to players as they trained and lived in a hotel for the latter 2020 Six Nations matches due to Coronavirus restrictions.
