= Warren Abrahams =

South African rugby union coach (1981/1982–2025)

- Born: 1981 or 1982; Cape Town, South Africa
- Died: 10 October 2025 (aged 43); Nairobi, Kenya
- Occupation: Rugby union coach
- Known for: Head coach of the Wales women's national rugby union team

Warren Abrahams (1981 or 1982 – 10 October 2025) was a South African born rugby union coach who served as head coach of the Wales women’s national team from November 2020 to July 2021 and later led Belgium’s women’s sevens programme. He was the first Black national team head coach in Welsh rugby.

== Early life and education ==
Abrahams grew up in Durbanville in Cape Town and played club rugby for Durbanville Bellville before representing Stellenbosch University, commonly known as Maties. He attended Stellenbosch on a scholarship and later moved to the United Kingdom in his twenties to pursue coaching opportunities.

== Coaching career ==
After playing, Abrahams began a developmental pathway in England and joined Harlequins, working in the club academy structure between 2011 and 2019. During this period, he also held roles within international sevens set ups, contributing to programmes with Germany and Lithuania.

In late 2019, he moved to the United States to become assistant coach with the USA Women’s Sevens, relocating to California before the programme was disrupted by financial restructuring and the COVID-19 pandemic. He returned to Britain in 2020 and on 18 November that year was appointed Wales women’s head coach on a three year contract, becoming the first Black national team head coach in Welsh rugby. His tenure encompassed the 2021 Women’s Six Nations campaign before he left the post by mutual agreement in July 2021.

Following his Wales spell, Abrahams continued in high performance and skills development, including school and academy coaching in England and specialist consulting in the women’s game. He later worked as a consultant with Brazil’s women’s sevens programme before taking charge of Belgium’s women’s sevens side in 2025.

== Personal life and death ==
Abrahams spoke of relocating with his family to California when he joined USA Women’s Sevens, later returning to the United Kingdom as he pursued new roles. He founded Rugby Creative, a coaching and skills initiative through which he shared development methods and mentoring approaches alongside his professional posts.

Abrahams died in Nairobi on 10 October 2025, while with Belgium at the Safari Sevens. He was 43.
