= Lisa Cockburn =

- Born: 6 December 1992 (age 33) Basingstoke, England
- Height: 1.75 m (5 ft 9 in)
- Weight: 87 kg (192 lb)

Rugby union career
- Position: Loosehead Prop
Senior career
Years	Team	Apps	(Points)
2014-2021	DMP Sharks		
2021-2022	Worcester Warriors	6	(0)
2023-2024	Leicester Tigers	14	(5)
2024-2025	Gloucester-Hartpury		
International career
Years	Team	Apps	(Points)
2018-2025	Scotland		

Lisa Cockburn (born 6 December 1992) is a former Scottish rugby player from Basingstoke, who played in the 2021 Women's Six Nations Championship and competed internationally for Scotland between 2018 and 2025.

== Club career ==
Cockburn plays for Darlington Mowden Park Sharks. She debuted for the team in 2013. In 2019, she was one of the players participating in a study for Sunderland University, which found women's rugby matches to be more dynamic and homogenised than men's.

Before joining DMP Sharks, she played for multiple clubs in England including her Universities, Ellingham & Ringwood, Havant, Solent Sirens and Basingstoke. She was one of four players in the 2021 Women's Six Nations Championship to have played for the small local New Forest club of Ellingham & Ringwood.

Whilst at Leeds Metropolitan (now Leeds Beckett), Cockburn supported the team to four BUCS Championship finals.

== International career ==
Her Scottish heritage runs deep, with both parents and three of her grandparents hailing from Scotland, and this connection has paved the way for her to represent Scotland on the international stage.

Cockburn plays for Scotland through the Scottish Qualified system and was given her first opportunity to play for the side by coach Shade Munro, making her international debut in the Scotland-Italy match of the 2018 Women's Six Nations Championship.

She scored her first try for Scotland in a match against Japan in 2019.

After securing 16 caps, Cockburn was among the Scottish team selected for the 2021 Women's Six Nations Championship, coming on as a replacement at 69 minutes for the play-off against Wales, in which Scotland won 27–20 to secure them fifth place in the tournament. She also came on as a replacement for the Italy match and the opener against England, in which the Scottish side was defeated.

In 2018, she also played in the Glasgow match against Canada, in which the visiting side secured a close-run victory over the Scottish side.

She was named in the Scottish squad for the 2025 Women's Rugby World Cup in England.

== Personal life ==
Cockburn graduated with a degree from Leeds Metropolitan University in Sport and Exercise Therapy in 2014. She then went onto study for a MSc in Strength and Conditioning. She cites fellow Scottish player Jade Konkel as her rugby role model.
