= Gwenllian Jenkins =

- Born: 20 November 2000 (age 25) Carmarthen, Wales
- Height: 168 cm (5 ft 6 in)
- Weight: 87 kg (192 lb)

Rugby union career
- Position: Prop
- Current team: Scarlets
Amateur team(s)
Years	Team	Apps	(Points)
- Lampeter Town
Senior career
Years	Team	Apps	(Points)
- Scarlets
International career
Years	Team	Apps	(Points)
2019–	Wales	3	

Gwenllian Jenkins (born 20 November 2000) is a Welsh Rugby Union player who plays prop for the Wales women's national rugby union team and Scarlets. She made her debut for the Wales national squad in 2019, and represented them at the 2021 Women's Six Nations Championship.

== Club career ==
Jenkins plays for Lampeter Town RFC and Scarlets.

== International career ==
Jenkins first played on the international stage during the 2019 Autumn Internationals, where she won two caps. She was then called up in 2021 to represent Wales during the 2021 Women's Six Nations Championship.

She has won three caps in her rugby career to date.

== Personal life ==
As a child, Welsh-speaking Jenkins attended Ysgol Bro Pedr, before undertaking an apprenticeship in outdoor activities with national voluntary youth organisation Urdd Gobaith Cymru.
