= Ysgol Dyffryn Aman =

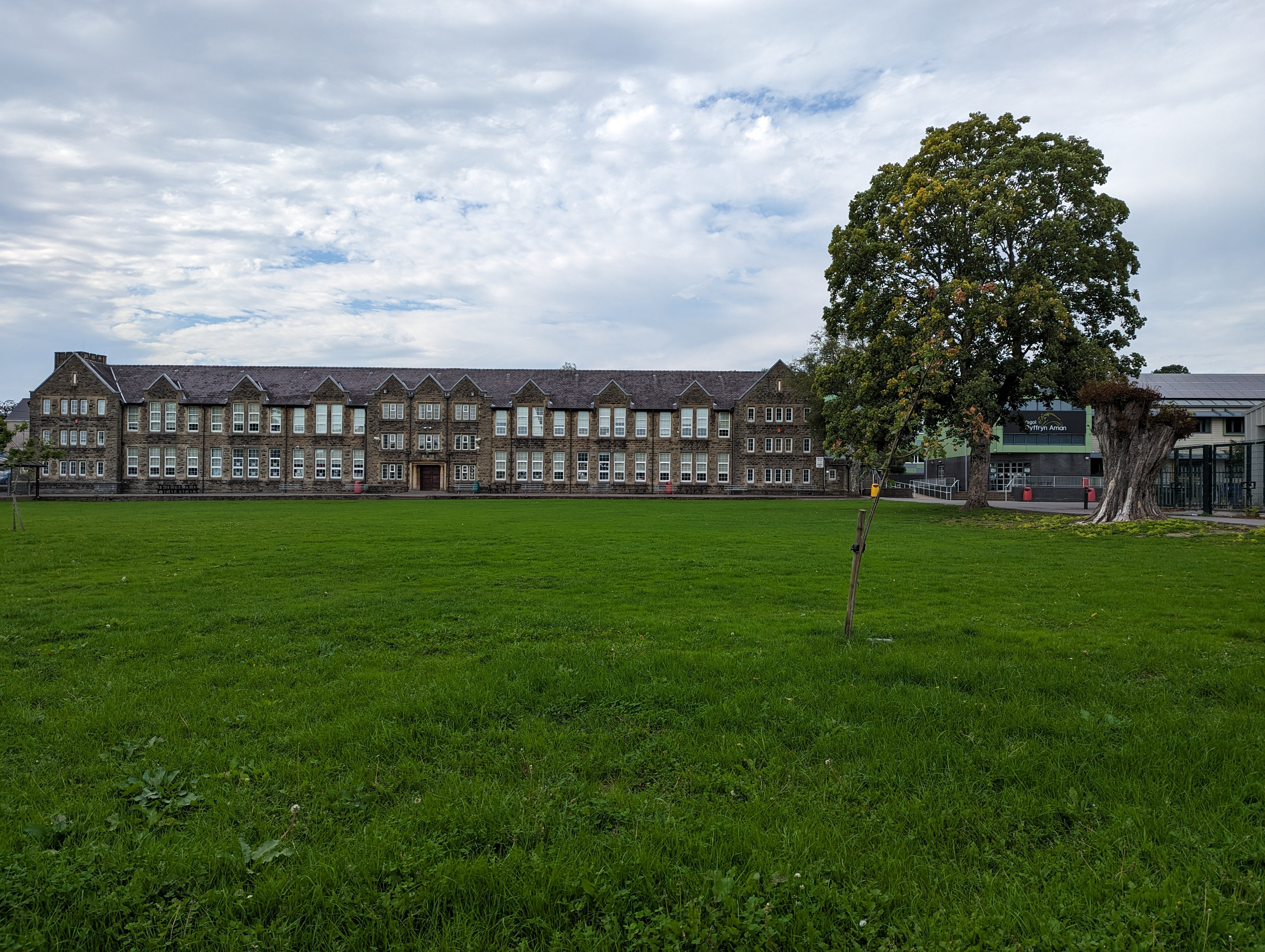

Location
- Margaret Street; Ammanford, Carmarthenshire, SA18 2NW; Wales; 51°47′45″N 3°59′09″W

Information
- Type: Comprehensive School
- Motto: Parched Bob Byw Eich Orchwyl
- Established: 1913, New school 1928
- Local authority: Carmarthenshire County Council
- Department for Education URN: 401751 Tables
- Ofsted: Reports
- Headteacher: J. Durbridge
- Staff: 100+
- Gender: Co-educational
- Age: 11 to 18
- Enrollment: 1,543 (2024)
- Language: Bilingual (Type B)
- Houses: Amanwy – Llwyd – Nantlais – Watcyn –
- Colours: Green – top set, blue – 2nd set, white – middle, yellow – 4th set, red – 5th set
- Website: https://dyffrynaman.org

Ysgol Dyffryn Aman (lit. transl. Amman Valley School) is a bilingual (Welsh and English) comprehensive school and sixth form in Ammanford, Carmarthenshire, Wales. It is situated on Margaret Street in the north of Ammanford town centre. As of 2024, the school has 1,543 students enrolled, of whom 227 are in the sixth form.

== Admissions ==
It is a mixed-gender non-denominational secondary school. At the time of the school's 2019 Estyn inspection, it had 1,436 pupils on roll, including 267 in the sixth form. Approximately one third of students come from Welsh-speaking homes, 47% speak Welsh fluently, and more than half of the students study Welsh as their first language.

== History ==
The school was formerly known as Amman Valley Comprehensive School (AVCS), prior to which it was the Amman Valley Grammar School.

=== Grammar school ===
It originally opened as Amman Valley County School in 1913, while a new school was built, opening 19 January 1928.

=== Second World War ===
The John Roan School was evacuated from south-east London in 1940, and to Llandybie. The London school was educated in the afternoons.

=== Comprehensive ===
In 1970, Amman Valley Grammar School and Amman Valley Secondary Modern School merged, becoming Amman Valley Comprehensive School. The school adopted a bilingual name, Ysgol Dyffryn Aman / Amman Valley School, prior to 2011. Following education reform in the Dinefwr area, the board of governors unanimously voted in favour of changing the name to Ysgol Dyffryn Aman. The school is now known by its Welsh name only and this is the form used on all official literature, signs and documents.

=== 2024 stabbing ===
On 24 April 2024, the school was placed on lockdown after two teachers and a student were injured in a stabbing attack. A teenage girl was arrested by Dyfed–Powys Police on suspicion of attempted murder, and two air ambulances and an ambulance were sent to the scene at 11:30 a.m. The police requested that footage of the incident on social media be "removed to avoid contempt of court and distress to those affected". Pupils of the school were released at 3:20 p.m. to their parents and guardians, many of whom had been waiting outside the school. The three casualties were later discharged from hospital.

On 3 February 2025, the 14-year-old perpetrator was found guilty of three counts of attempted murder, having pleaded guilty to three counts of wounding with intent and possession of a bladed article. The girl had told police officers that she committed the acts to be on the news and be a celebrity. She was sentenced to 15 years of detention.

== Estyn reports ==
The school's most recent Estyn report was conducted in 2019. The school was judged to be 'good' in its standards, teaching and learning experiences, pastoral care, and leadership and management. Its wellbeing and attitudes to learning were described as 'excellent'. It was recommended that the school improves its students' spoken and written Welsh, provide a wider curriculum for Key Stage 4 and the sixth form, and improve ICT skills across all subjects.
