= Shade Munro =

Scotland rugby union player (born 1966)

- Born: Donald Shade Munro; 19 November 1966 (age 59) Paisley, Renfrewshire, Scotland

Rugby union career
- Position: Lock
Amateur team(s)
Years	Team	Apps	(Points)
1984-97	Glasgow High Kelvinside		
1987	Greytown		
1996	Te Puke Sports		
Senior career
Years	Team	Apps	(Points)
1996-97	Glasgow Warriors	4	(0)
Provincial / State sides
Years	Team	Apps	(Points)
-	Wairarapa Bush		
-	Glasgow District		
-	Bay of Plenty		
International career
Years	Team	Apps	(Points)
1988-90	Scotland 'B'	3	
1992-96	Scotland 'A'	6	
1994-97	Scotland	7	
Coaching career
- Years: Team
- 2003–15: Glasgow Warriors (Asst.)
- 2015–19: Scotland (women)
- 2019-: Scottish Rugby Academy (Glasgow)

Donald Shade Munro (born 19 November 1966, Paisley, Scotland) is a Scottish rugby union player, who played at lock/second row.

== Rugby union career ==
=== Amateur career ===
In Scotland he played for Eastwood High School (Newton Mearns) and subsequently for Glasgow High Kelvinside. where he played from 1984 to 1997.

He spent two stints in New Zealand, the first in 1987, when he played for club side Greytown.

In 1996, he returned to New Zealand and he played for club side Te Puke Sports.

He retired at the end of 1996–97 season, a knee injury he suffered in 1990 cutting short his career.

=== Provincial career ===
He came through the Glasgow District U21 side to play for the senior District side in the 1980s.

In 1989–90 he played for the Glasgow District side that remained unbeaten all season.

In 1987 he went on to represent the provincial team in New Zealand, Wairarapa Bush in a Ranfurly Shield Challenge against Auckland, which included 14 current All Blacks.

In 1996 in his second spell in New Zealand, he again went on to represent the provincial team, Bay of Plenty in 14 games, the highlight being another Ranfurly Shield challenge against Auckland at Eden Park.

When the Glasgow District turned professional in 1996 as Glasgow Warriors, he went on to play four times with the Glasgow side, before his retirement in 1997.

=== International career ===
He was capped by Scotland 'B' 3 times, the first cap against France 'B' on 20 March 1988.

He was capped by Scotland 'A' 6 times, from 1992 to 1996.

He was selected to tour New Zealand in 1990, the year of Scotland's 2nd Grand Slam, but he suffered a leg break playing for Scotland against a West of Scotland International Select captained by All Black World Cup winning captain David Kirk. It would be nearly 2 years before Munro played again after initially being told that the injury was so severe he would never play again. He was capped seven times between 1994 and 1997 for Scotland.

According to Richard Bath [2007]: "Munro... would have surely won many more caps but for a horrendous leg injury. He has made great strides as a coach and is currently assistant to Sean Lineen at Glasgow."

He also represented Scotland on numerous tour abroad, Japan 1989, South Seas(Fiji, Tonga and Western Samoa)1993 and Argentina in 1994. He also represented Scotland in the 1994 Hong Kong sevens which demonstrates how fast and skillful he was for such a big man.

Other career highlights were representing the Barbarians on a Charity tour to Japan to help raise money for the Kobe Earth Quake disaster fund as well as representing the Barbarians on various Easter tours. Other representative honours include playing for the Scottish Saltires, Co-Optimists and Rugby Eccose.

=== Coaching career ===
He quickly took to coaching where he found a new lease of life taking charge of the newly formed Glasgow Hawks 2nd XV for the season 1997–1998. The following season he became assistant coach of the Glasgow Hawks 1st XV and then became head coach the following season where he stayed for a further 3 seasons.

It was then that he was employed by the Scottish Rugby Union, on a part-time basis, as part of the coaching staff at the Glasgow Warriors Professional team from 2003. He was an assistant coach for Glasgow Warriors for many years. In his final year 2014–15 at the club the Warriors won the Pro12 for the first time becoming the first Scottish side to win a major trophy in the professional era.

He was the head coach of the Scottish Women's national team.

In 2019 he became the Glasgow Warriors Senior Academy Lead Rugby Coach based at Scotstoun Stadium Scottish Rugby Academy.

== Family ==
Munro is the grandson of JM Bannerman, who was capped in thirty seven consecutive matches for Scotland (a world record at the time), and was a successful Liberal Party peer and Scottish Gaelic advocate, who was president of An Comunn Gaidhealach for a while.

His aunt was Ray Michie, a speech therapist and Liberal Democrat MP, as well as the first peer to pledge the oath of allegiance in the House of Lords in Gaelic.

He is also related to John Bannerman, the historian, and the Gaelic novelist Chrissie Dick.

He is married and has two children.
