= 2021–22 Premier 15s =

- Countries: England
- Date: 4 September 2021 – 3 June 2022
- Champions: Saracens Women (3rd title)
- Runners-up: Exeter Chiefs Women
- Matches played: 92
- Highest attendance: 3,288–Saracens vs Exeter, 3 June 2022
- Tries scored: 740 (average 8 per match)
- Top point scorer: (England) Emma Sing (Gloucester-Hartpury)–150 points
- Top try scorer: (England) Marlie Packer (Saracens)–17 tries

Official website
- www.premier15s.com

The 2021–22 Premier 15s is the 5th season of the Premier 15s (23rd including editions of the previous Women's Premiership), of the top flight of English domestic women's rugby union competition and the second to be sponsored by Allianz. Incorporated in the season also was the inaugural Allianz Cup, a women's equivalent of the Premiership Rugby Cup.

Saracens Women, who finished top of the league table during the regular season, won their third Premiers 15s title on 3 June 2022, after defeating Exeter Chiefs Women by 43–21 in the play-off final.

== Teams ==
The 10 teams competing in the 2021–22 Premier 15s season are:

Club	Director of Rugby/ Head coach	Captain	Kit supplier	Stadium	Capacity	City/Area
Bristol Bears Women	(England) Dave Ward	(England) Amber Reed	Umbro	Shaftesbury Park	200	Bristol
DMP Durham Sharks	(England) Jake Rodgers	(England) Georgina Roberts	Macron	The Darlington Arena	25,500	Darlington, County Durham
DMP Durham Sharks	(England) Jake Rodgers	(England) Georgina Roberts	Macron	The Racecourse	8,500	Durham, County Durham
Exeter Chiefs Women	(England) Susie Appleby	(United States) Kate Zackary	Samurai	Sandy Park	13,593	Exeter, Devon
Gloucester-Hartpury	(Wales) Sean Lynn	(England) Natasha Hunt	Elite Pro Sports	Hartpury University Stadium	600	Gloucester, Gloucestershire
Harlequins Women	(Ireland) Gerard Mullen	(England) Rachael Burford	Adidas	Twickenham Stoop	14,800	Twickenham, Greater London
Harlequins Women	(Ireland) Gerard Mullen	(England) Rachael Burford	Adidas	Surrey Sports Park	—	Guildford, Surrey
Loughborough Lightning	(Wales) Rhys Edwards	(England) Lark Davies	Kukri	Loughborough University Stadium	3,330	Loughborough, Leicestershire
Sale Sharks Women	(England) Darren Lamon	(England) Beth Stafford	Macron	Heywood Road	3,387	Sale, Greater Manchester
Saracens Women	(England) Alex Austerberry	(United States) Lotte Clapp	Castore	StoneX Stadium	10,500	Hendon, Greater London
Wasps Women	(England) Giselle Mather	(England) Kate Alder (England) Claudia MacDonald	Hummel	Twyford Avenue Sports Ground	—	Acton, London
Worcester Warriors Women	(England) Joanne Yapp	(Scotland) Lyndsay O'Donnell	VX3	Sixways Stadium	11,499	Worcester, Worcestershire

== Table ==
2021–22 Premier 15s Table
Pos	Team	Pld	W	D	L	PF	PA	PD	TF	TA	TB	LB	Pts	Qualification
1	Saracens Women (C)	18	16	0	2	645	358	+287	97	53	13	0	77	Play-off place
2	Exeter Chiefs Women (RU)	18	13	1	4	650	275	+375	99	41	10	2	66	Play-off place
3	Bristol Bears Women (SF)	18	11	1	6	525	314	+211	85	49	12	4	62	Play-off place
4	Harlequins Women (SF)	18	12	0	6	579	309	+270	92	46	11	2	61	Play-off place
5	Wasps Women	18	9	1	8	440	327	+113	70	49	10	3	52	
6	Gloucester-Hartpury	18	9	1	8	541	327	+214	83	49	8	5	51	
7	Loughborough Lightning	18	9	2	7	441	372	+69	70	57	9	2	51	
8	Worcester Warriors Women	18	6	0	12	427	483	−56	67	74	7	4	35	
9	Sale Sharks Women	18	2	0	16	293	599	−306	43	95	5	1	14	
10	DMP Durham Sharks	18	0	0	18	63	1240	−1177	11	204	0	0	0	

Source: England Rugby
Rules for classification: Tiebreakers for teams tied on points: 1) Number of matches won; 2) Difference between points for and against; 3) Total number of points for; 4) Aggregate number of points scored in matches between tied teams; 5) Number of matches won excluding the first match, then the second and so on until the tie is settled.
(C) Champions. (RU) Runners-up. (SF) Losing semi-finalists.

== Regular season ==
The fixtures for the 2021–22 season were announced by the Rugby Football Union on 6 August 2021.

=== Round 1 ===
4 September 2021
12:00

(1 BP) Bristol Bears Women	38–21	Exeter Chiefs Women
Try: Murray 8' c West (2) 29' m, 45' m Penalty try 60'; Lillicrap 69' c Burgess 76' c Con: Snowsill (2) 8', 70'; Skuse 77'	Report	Try: Robinson 18' c Hunt 21' c Zackary 65' c Con: Cantorna (3) 19', 22', 66'

Shaftesbury Park

4 September 2021
13:30

(1 BP) Sale Sharks Women	24–29	Worcester Warriors Women (1 BP)
Try: Ounsley 22' c Bawden 34' m V.E. Irwin 80+1' c Con: V.A. Irwin (3) 23', 35', 80+1'; Pen: V.A. Irwin 80+1'	Report	Try: Mattinson 16' c Thompson 20' m Washington 43' c Harries 79' c Con: Foxwell (3) 17', 44', 79'; Pen: Foxwell 9'

Heywood Road

4 September 2021
15:00

(1 BP) Wasps Women	20–26	Saracens Women (1 BP)
Try: Boatman 19' c Burton 66' c Con: F. Williams 19'; Edwards 66'; Pen: F. Williams 23'; Edwards 71'	Report	Try: Casey 13' m Clapp 42' c Campbell 60' c Packer 74' c Con: Harrison (3) 42', 60', 74'

Twyford Avenue

4 September 2021
16:30

(1 BP) Gloucester-Hartpury	84–0	DMP Durham Sharks
Try: Sing (2) 3' c, 38' c K. Jones 12' m Smith (2) 18' c, 67' c Tandy 25' m Brock 35' c Hunt 40' c Underwood (3) 57' m, 73' m, 80+1' m Isaac (2) 75' m, 79' m Con: Sing (5) 4', 19', 36', 38', 40+1'; Wilkins (2) 61', 68'	Report

Hartpury University Stadium

5 September 2021
15:00

(1 BP) Harlequins Women	50–15	Loughborough Lightning
Try: Scott 2' m Cowell (3) 15' c, 55' c, 59' m Cokayne 32' c Kildunne 69' m Blacklock 72' c Green 77' c Con: Tuima (3) 16', 33', 56'; Green (2) 73', 78'	Report	Try: Davies 20' m Hunter 40' m Swartz 80+1' m

Twickenham Stoop

=== Round 2 ===
11 September 2021
11:30

DMP Durham Sharks	5–77	Saracens Women (1 BP)
Try: Cowan 63' m	Report	Try: Clapp (2) 4' m, 9' c Aitchison 14' m Packer 26' m Harrison 30' c K. Evans (2) 34' m, 40' c Wyrwas 47' m Laqeretabua 49' c P. Cleall 53' c Rettie 60' m Fleetwood 74' m McKenna 77' c Con: Harrison (3) 10', 31', 40+1'; Aitchison (3) 50', 55', 77'

The Darlington Arena

11 September 2021
14:00

(1 BP) Gloucester-Hartpury	17–24	Bristol Bears Women (1 BP)
Try: Powell 17' c Smith 59' c Con: Sing (2) 18', 60'; Pen: Sing 12'	Report	Try: Murray (2) 52' c, 68' m West 64' m Marston 79' c Con: Snowsill 54'; Reed 79'

Hartpury University Stadium

11 September 2021
14:00

(1 BP) Worcester Warriors Women	31–66	Harlequins Women (1 BP)
Try: Washington 13' m Phillips 20' m Cox 38' c Moss 72' c Lewis 80+1'; Con: Foxwell (3) 39', 72', 80' +2	Report	Try: Cowell 3' c Kildunne (3) 9' c, 65' c, 76' c Dainton 34' c Swords 41' m Cokayne (2) 48' c, 50' c Brooks 52' c Mayhew 62' m Con: Green (3) 3', 10', 35'; Tuima (5) 48', 51', 52', 65', 77'

Sixways

12 September 2021
14:00

Loughborough Lightning	0–29	Wasps Women (1 BP)
	Report	Try: Crake 4' m Boatman 10' m Dow 46' c MacDonald 50' c Kerr 60' m Con: F. Williams (2) 47', 51'

Loughborough University

12 September 2021
14:00

(1 BP) Exeter Chiefs Women	54–0	Sale Sharks Women
Try: Jones 2' c Kobayashi 13' c Zackary 16' m Menin 29' c Hunt (2) 37' c, 69' c Jefferies 43' c Duncan 59' c Con: Cantorna (7) 3', 13', 30', 38', 43', 59', 70'	Report

Sandy Park

=== Round 3 ===
18 September 2021
11:00

(1 BP) Bristol Bears Women	115–0	DMP Durham Sharks
Try: West (2) 4' m, 40+1' c Keight (5) 10' m, 26' m, 28' c, 43' c, 46' m Reed 13' m Murray (3) 16' c, 33' m, 54' m Bern 24' c Bevan 36' c Lillicrap 57' c Lock (2) 60' c, 65' m Skuse 68' m Martin 71' c Butchers 73' c Con: Snowsill (2) 17', 25'; Reed (3) 30', 37', 40+1'; Skuse (5) 44', 58', 61', 72', 74'	Report

Shaftesbury Park

18 September 2021
13:00

(1 BP) Saracens Women	38–7	Loughborough Lightning
Try: Clapp 3' c Harrison (2) 10' c, 79' m McKenna 20' c Packer 30' c Rose 71' m Con: Harrison (4) 3', 10', 20', 30'	Report	Try: Penalty try 34'

StoneX Stadium

18 September 2021
14:00

Sale Sharks Women	21–45	Gloucester-Hartpury (1 BP)
Try: Grieve 10' c Benson (2) 66' c, 75' c Con: V.A. Irwin (3) 11', 66', 75'	Report	Try: Powell (2) 6' c, 52' c Penalty try 24'; Underwood (2) 33' c, 58' m Aldcroft 39' m Sing 56' m Con: Sing (4) 6', 34', 39', 52'

Heywood Road

18 September 2021
14:00

(1 BP) Wasps Women	26–22	Worcester Warriors Women (1 BP)
Try: MacDonald 3' c Cooksey 31' c Dow 56' c Burnfield 71' m Con: F. Williams (3) 4', 32', 57'	Report	Try: Mattinson 6' m Callender 37' c Matthews 39' c Con: Foxwell (2) 37', 40'; Pen: Foxwell 50'

Twyford Avenue

18 September 2021
15:00

Harlequins Women	12–24	Exeter Chiefs Women (1 BP)
Try: Fletcher 36' c Harper 80+1' m Con: Green 37'	Report	Try: Hunt 40+1' m Van der Velden 56' c Sheehan 61' m Johnson 71' c Con: Robinson (2) 57', 72'

Twickenham Stoop

=== Round 4 ===
2 October 2021
14:00

(1 BP) Bristol Bears Women	27–17	Sale Sharks Women
Try: Murray 9' m Coles 19' m West 27' m Pam 38' c Lillicrap 47'; Con: Snowsill 39'	Report	Try: Perrin 33' c Delany 43' m V.A. Irwin 63' m Con: V.A. Irwin 34'

Shaftesbury Park

2 October 2021
14:00

Exeter Chiefs Women	23–13	Wasps Women
Try: Menin 53' c Johnson 69' c Con: Cantorna (2) 54', 70'; Pen: Cantorna (3) 39', 46', 75'	Report	Try: Wilson-Hardy 32' m Boatman 80' m Pen: F. Williams 50'

Sandy Park

2 October 2021
15:00

DMP Durham Sharks	0–59	Loughborough Lightning (1 BP)
	Report	Try: Davey 5' m Antwis 14' m Alejandro 32' c Svoboda 37' c Davies (3) 40+1' c, 60' c, 69' c Harper 55' c Tasker 64' c Con: Rowland (7) 33', 38', 40' +2, 56', 61', 65', 70'

The Darlington Arena

2 October 2021
16:15

(1 BP) Gloucester-Hartpury	18–21	Harlequins Women
Try: Smith (2) 7' m, 22' c Con: Sing 23'; Pen: Sing (2) 29', 39'	Report	Try: Kildunne 19' c Bonar 43' c Brown 79' c Con: Tuima (3) 20', 44', 79'

Hartpury University Stadium

2 October 2021
17:30

Worcester Warriors Women	5–34	Saracens Women (1 BP)
Try: Brincat 67' m	Report	Try: Clapp 8' m Laqeretabua 19' c Harrison 26' m Cleall 59' c K. Evans 80' c Con: Harrison (3) 26', 59', 80'; Pen: Harrison 19'

Sixways

=== Round 5 ===
9 October 2021
15:00

Harlequins Women	5–24	Bristol Bears Women (1 BP)
Try: Robinson 19' m	Report	Try: Keight 12' m Compton 45' c Joyce 49' c West 59' m Con: Reed (2) 46', 50'

Twickenham Stoop

9 October 2021
16:00

(1 BP) Loughborough Lightning	14–18	Worcester Warriors Women
Try: Davies (2) 51' c, 78' c Con: Rowland (2) 52', 79'	Report	Try: Washington 61' m Keates 66' c Con: Murphy 67'; Pen: Yamamoto 46'; Murphy 79'

Loughborough University

9 October 2021
18:00

DMP Durham Sharks	0–31	Sale Sharks Women (1 BP)
	Report	Try: Delany 7' m Lyons 12' m Benson (2) 26' c, 44' c Neumann 40' c Con: Law (3) 27', 40+1', 45'

The Darlington Arena

10 October 2021
14:00

(1 BP) Saracens Women	32–19	Exeter Chiefs Women
Try: Miell 10' c Cleall (2) 23' c, 50' c Botterman 40' m Con: Harrison (3) 10', 23', 50'; Pen: Harrison (2) 28', 64'	Report	Try: Bradley 7' c Jefferies 60' m Robinson 78' c Con: Cantorna (2) 7', 78'

StoneX Stadium

10 October 2021
17:15

(1 BP) Wasps Women	34–25	Gloucester-Hartpury
Try: Muir 10' c Dow (3) 50' m, 54' c, 64' c MacDonald 67' m Con: F. Williams 11'; Jones (2) 55', 65'; Pen: F. Williams 23'	Report	Try: Hunt 27' m Lewis 60' c Underwood 77' c Con: Sing (2) 61', 78'; Pen: Sing (2) 7', 40'

Coventry Building Society Arena

=== Round 6 ===
27 November 2021
14:30

Sale Sharks Women	10–36	Harlequins Women (1 BP)
Try: McLachlan 37' c Con: Law 37'; Pen: Law 13'	Report	Try: Cornborough 17' c Cokayne 26' m Robinson 33' c Kildunne (2) 40' m, 64' m Konkel 79' c Con: Tuima (3) 17', 33', 79'

Heywood Road

27 November 2021
15:00

Exeter Chiefs Women	14–7	Loughborough Lightning (1 BP)
Try: Sheehan 19' c Jefferies 50' c Con: García (2) 19', 50'	Report	Try: Tasker 23' c Con: Nelson 23'

Sandy Park

27 November 2021
15:00

(1 BP) Gloucester-Hartpury	21–24	Saracens Women
Try: Lund 43' c Powell 59' c Heard 67' c Con: Sing (3) 45', 60', 68'	Report	Try: Wyrwas 10' c Botterman 33' c Packer 79' c Con: Harrison (3) 10', 33', 79'; Pen: Harrison 80+1'

Hartpury University Stadium

28 November 2021
12:30

(1 BP) Bristol Bears Women	36–17	Wasps Women
Try: Butchers 4' c Keight (2) 11' m, 65' m Powell 27' c, 57' c West 54' m Con: Reed (3) 5', 28', 58'	Report	Try: Penalty try 40+1'; Moloney 50' c Con: F. Williams 50'; Pen: F. Williams 9'

Shaftesbury Park

22 January 2022
15:00

DMP Durham Sharks	5–74	Worcester Warriors Women
	Report

The Darlington Arena

=== Round 7 ===
4 December 2021
12:30

Saracens Women	17–12	Bristol Bears Women (1 BP)
Try: Penalty try 20'; Wyrwas 55' c Con: Aitchison 55'; Pen: Harrison 75'	Report	Try: Hesketh 15' m Lovibond 72' c Con: Reed 72'

StoneX Stadium

4 December 2021
13:30

(1 BP) Wasps Women	22–8	Sale Sharks Women
Try: Kerr (2) 40+1' c, 62' m Nye 56' c Monaghan 76' m Con: F. Williams 40+1'	Report	Try: Neumann 69' m Pen: Law 55'

Twyford Avenue

4 December 2021
15:00

(1 BP) Harlequins Women	69–7	DMP Durham Sharks
Try: Burford 4' c Catlin (2) 14' m, 50' c S. Brown 27' c Robinson 38' m Scott 46' m Beckett 59' c Kildunne (2) 64' m, 79' c Mayhew 72' c Dainton 75' c Con: Tuima (7) 5', 28', 51', 60', 73', 76', 79'	Report	Try: Gardner 68' c Con: Cookland 69'

Twickenham Stoop

4 December 2021
16:30

(2 BP) Gloucester-Hartpury	31–33	Loughborough Lightning (1 BP)
Try: Powell 12' c Lund 53' c Lewis 62' m Underwood 74' m Tuipulotu 78' c Con: Sing (3) 13', 54', 78'	Report	Try: Rowland 8' c Goldthorp 25' c Lingham (2) 35' c, 40+1' c Davies 77' m Con: Rowland (4) 9', 26', 36', 40+1'

Hartpury University Stadium

4 December 2021
17:30

Worcester Warriors Women	12–29	Exeter Chiefs Women (1 BP)
Try: Mattinson 26' m Harries 80' c Con: Murphy 80'	Report	Try: Van der Velden 17' c McGillivray 30' c Rollie 48' c Menin 60' m Con: García (3) 18', 31', 49'; Pen: García 34'

Sixways

=== Round 8 ===
11 December 2021
12:30

(1 BP) Exeter Chiefs Women	8–10	Gloucester-Hartpury
Try: García 25' m Pen: García 52'	Report	Try: Aldcroft 18' m Smith 68' m

Sandy Park

11 December 2021
13:00

(1 BP) Worcester Warriors Women	12–14	Bristol Bears Women
Try: Callender 4' c Varley 40' m Con: Yamamoto 5'	Report	Try: Lovibond 29' c Phillips 77' c Con: Reed (2) 30', 78'

Sixways

11 December 2021
13:00

(1 BP) Loughborough Lightning	27–0	Sale Sharks Women
Try: Wassell 6' c Davies (2) 43' m, 54' c Rowland 74' c Con: Rowland (2) 7', 75'; Pen: Rowland 35'	Report

Loughborough University

11 December 2021
13:30

(1 BP) Wasps Women	70–0	DMP Durham Sharks
Try: Burnfield 10' c Boatman (5) 12' c, 20' c, 56' m, 58' c, 75' m Molloy (2) 16' m, 64' m Burton 28' m Monaghan 39' m Moloney 53' c Muir 65' m Con: F. Williams (5) 11', 13', 21', 54', 59'	Report

Twyford Avenue

12 December 2021
15:00

Saracens Women	17–36	Harlequins Women (1 BP)
Try: Campbell 17' c Botterman 65' c Con: Harrison (2) 18', 65'; Pen: Harrison 29'	Report	Try: Konkel (2) 25' m, 78' c Fletcher 33' c E. Scott 40+1' c Beckett 50' c Con: Tuima (4) 33', 40+1', 50', 78'; Pen: Tuima 61'

StoneX Stadium

=== Round 9 ===
18 December 2021
14:00

Loughborough Lightning	17–14	Bristol Bears Women (1 BP)
Try: Davies (2) 38' m, 53' m Penalty try 67'	Report	Try: Joyce (2) 4' c, 16' c Con: Reed (2) 5', 17'

Loughborough University

18 December 2021
15:00

DMP Durham Sharks	0–88	Exeter Chiefs Women (1 BP)
	Report	Try: Sinclair 2' c Jefferies (4) 16' c, 22' c, 27' c, 77' m García (2) 20' c, 36' c Fryday 31' c Doidge 42' m Mackinder 56' m Tuttosi (2) 65' c, 69' c Sheehan 67' c McGillivray 79' c Con: García (5) 2', 21', 23', 28', 37'; Foster (4) 66', 67', 70', 79'

The Darlington Arena

19 December 2021
14:00

(1 BP) Sale Sharks Women	26–41	Saracens Women (1 BP)
Try: Delany 6' c V.E. Irwin 9' c Lyons 39' c Tonkin 57' m Con: Duffy (3) 7', 10', 40'	Report	Try: Waters 15' c Packer (2) 18' c, 54' c Clapp 31' c Campbell 40+1' c Con: Harrison (5) 16', 19', 32', 40+2', 55'; Pen: Harrison (2) 61', 76'

Heywood Road

19 December 2021
14:30

Worcester Warriors Women	10–36	Gloucester-Hartpury (1 BP)
Try: Farries 20' m Brown 33' m	Report	Try: Lund 4' c Sing 15' m Aldcroft (2) 24' c, 27' c Tuipulotu (2) 44', 59'; Con: Sing (3) 25', 28', 60'

Sixways

27 December 2021
13:00

(1 BP) Harlequins Women	29–5	Wasps Women
Try: Breach 37' c Kildunne 43' m Cowell 47' c Konkel 63' m Fletcher 78' c Con: Tuima (2) 38', 48'	Report	Try: Boatman 40+1' m

Twickenham

=== Round 10 ===
8 January 2022
12:30

Bristol Bears Women	14–36	Gloucester-Hartpury (1 BP)
Try: Penalty try 28'; Bevan 39'; Con: Reed 40'	Report	Try: Tuipulotu 6' c Brock 15' m Lund 41' c Sing 58' c Underwood (2) 67' m, 78' m Con: Sing (3) 7', 43', 59'

Shaftesbury Park

8 January 2022
13:30

(1 BP) Wasps Women	22–41	Loughborough Lightning (1 BP)
Try: Muir (2) 30' m, 64' c Dow 40+1' m Stone 71' m Con: Cleall 65'	Report	Try: Westcombe-Evans 16' c Svoboda (2) 18' c, 43' m Lingham (2) 20' m, 25' m Rowland 37' c Holtkamp 53' m Con: Rowland (3) 17', 19', 38'

Twyford Avenue

8 January 2022
14:00

Sale Sharks Women	7–43	Exeter Chiefs Women (1 BP)
Try: V.E. Irwin 32' c Con: V.A. Irwin 33'	Report	Try: Detiveuax 12' c Zackary 39' c Delgado 48' c Van der Velden 52' m Tuttosi 60' c Doidge 75' m Bradley 80+1' m Con: García (4) 12', 39' 48', 59'

Heywood Road

9 January 2022
14:00

(1 BP) Saracens Women	104–0	DMP Durham Sharks
Try: Barnes 4' m Laqeretabua (2) 7' m, 27' m Botterman (2) 13' c, 51' c Packer (3) 18' c, 23' c, 40+1' m Campbell 47' m K. Evans 55' c Wyrwas 58' c Cleall (3) 70' m, 74' m, 79' m Corrigan (2) 71' m, 76' m Clifford 80+1' m Con: Aitchison (7) 13', 18', 23', 31', 51', 55', 58'	Report

StoneX Stadium

9 January 2022
15:00

(1 BP) Harlequins Women	42–15	Worcester Warriors Women
Try: Cowell 16' m Tuima (3) 18' m, 51' m, 63' m Mayhew 26' m Cokayne 48' c Mullen 69' c Con: Green (2) 49', 70'; Pen: Green (1) 80+1'	Report	Try: Thompson 57' c Febrey 72' m Con: Murphy 58'; Pen: Nicholas 38'

Twickenham Stoop

=== Round 11 ===
15 January 2022

Gloucester-Hartpury	17–3	Sale Sharks Women
Try: Lund 26' m Powell 32' m Sommer 69' c Con: Sing 70'	Report	Pen: Law 53'

Hartpury University Stadium

15 January 2022

Loughborough Lightning	12–27	Saracens Women (1 BP)
Try: Rowland 34' c Davies 40+1' m Con: Rowland 35'	Report	Try: Packer 12' c Cleall (2) 32' m, 74' c Aitchison 40' m Con: Harrison (2) 13', 75'; Pen: Harrison 61'

Loughborough University

15 January 2022

DMP Durham Sharks	7–48	Bristol Bears Women (1 BP)
Try: Hazell 19' c Con: Cookland 20'	Report	Try: Bern (2) 2' m, 11' c Joyce (2) 26' m, 28' m Ward (2) 40', 46' c Marston (2) 54' c, 80' c Con: Reed (2) 13', 27'; Skuse (2) 55', 80+1'

The Darlington Arena

16 January 2022
14:00

Worcester Warriors Women	Cancelled; 0–0	Wasps Women (1 BP)
	Report

Sixways

16 January 2022
14:30

Exeter Chiefs Women	18–17	Harlequins Women (1 BP)
Try: Mpupha 17' m Rogers 80' c Con: García 18'; Pen: García (2) 62', 80' +2	Report	Try: Edwards 9 m' Konkel 23' m Duffy 65'; Con: Tuima 24'

Sandy Park

=== Round 12 ===
29 January 2022

Sale Sharks Women	5–36	Bristol Bears Women (1 BP)
Try: Neumann 40' m	Report	Try: West 28' m Ward 48' c Joyce (2) 52' m, 65' c Bern 70' c Hesketh 80' m Con: Reed 49'; Snowsill (2) 66', 71'

Heywood Road

29 January 2022

(1 BP) Harlequins Women	26–12	Gloucester-Hartpury
Try: S. Brown 3' c Cokayne (2) 28' c, 63' m Tuima 35' c Con: Tuima (3) 4', 29', 36'	Report	Try: C. Powell 9' c Blackburn 64' m Con: Sing 10'

Twickenham Stoop

29 January 2022

Wasps Women	15–15	Exeter Chiefs Women
Try: Muir 33' c B. Cleall 57' m Con: F. Williams 34'; Pen: F. Williams 77'	Report	Try: Nielson 15' m Mpuha 37' m Johnson 53' m

Twyford Avenue

29 January 2022

(1 BP) Saracens Women	39–28	Worcester Warriors Women (1 BP)
Try: Botterman 13' c Wyrwas 18' c Campbell 30' c Kelter 32' m M. Packer (2) 47' m, 76' m Con: Harrison (3) 14', 19', 31'; Pen: Harrison 79'	Report	Try: Thompson 9' m Phillips 42' c Laflin (2) 52' m, 61' m Con: Murphy 43'; Pen: Murphy (2) 25', 38'

StoneX Stadium

29 January 2022

(1 BP) Loughborough Lightning	58–5	DMP Durham Sharks
Try: Rowland 4' c Lingham (2) 6' m, 32' m Westcombe-Evans (2) 19' m, 30' m Davies 48' c Hardy 56' m Swartz 63' m Mueller 69' c Mataitoga 79' c Con: Rowland (4) 5', 49', 70', 80'	Report	Try: Inman 76' m

Loughborough University

=== Round 13 ===
5 February 2022

Gloucester-Hartpury	32–36	Exeter Chiefs Women
Try: Crabb 28' c H. Jones 50' c C. Powell 70' m Tuipulotu 79' c Con: Sing (3) 29', 51', 80'; Pen: Sing (2) 15', 38'	Report	Try: Kobayashi 4' c Zackary (3) 20' c, 55' m, 75' c Johnson 41' m Con: García (3) 5', 21', 76'

Hartpury University Stadium

5 February 2022

Bristol Bears Women	12–10	Worcester Warriors Women
Try: West 57' m K. Powell 76' c Con: Snowsill 77'	Report	Try: Harries 47' m Shekells 71' m

Shaftesbury Park

5 February 2022

Sale Sharks Women	3–32	Loughborough Lightning
Pen: E. Duffy 12'	Report	Try: Campion 1' m Davies (2) 37' c, 60' m Rowland 72' m Kabeya 77' c Con: Rowland (2) 38', 78'; Pen: Rowland 17'

Heywood Road

5 February 2022

Harlequins Women	8–22	Saracens Women
Try: Cokayne 6' m Pen: Tuima 36'	Report	Try: Aitchison 19' c M. Packer 63' m Fleetwood 75' c Con: Kelter (2) 20', 76'; Pen: Kelter 73'

Twickenham Stoop

5 February 2022

DMP Durham Sharks	0–46	Wasps Women
	Report	Try: Muir (3) 4' m, 12' m, 16' c Molloy 8' m Millar-Mills 18' m Dow 30' c Cooksey 33' c Searcy 64' m Con: F. Williams (3) 17', 31' 34'

The Darlington Arena

=== Round 14 ===
19 February 2022

Harlequins Women	40–8	Sale Sharks Women
Try: Harper 8' c S. Brown (2) 22' c, 43' c Beckett 34' c H. Duffy 66' c Aucken 78' m Con: Green (5) 9', 23', 35', 44', 67'	Report	Try: V.E. Irwin 52' m Pen: E. Duffy 4'

Twickenham Stoop

19 February 2022

Wasps Women	5–7	Bristol Bears Women
Try: Muir 3' m	Report	Try: Murray 10' c Con: Reed 11'

Twyford Avenue

19 February 2022

Saracens Women	35–20	Gloucester-Hartpury
Try: Wyrwas 13' c Carson 24' c Corrigan 54' c Clifford 58' c Campbell 74' c Con: Martin (5) 14', 25', 55', 59', 75'	Report	Try: Maude 17' c Caplice 38' m Underwood 77' m Con: Fahey 18'; Pen: Fahey 46'

StoneX Stadium

19 February 2022

Worcester Warriors Women	57–17	DMP Durham Sharks
Try: Brincat 8' c Foxwell 15' c Phillips (2) 21' m, 30' c Laflin (2) 37' c, 79' c Lewis 43' c Shermer (2) 59' m, 74' m Con: Murphy (6) 9', 16', 31', 38', 44', 80'	Report	Try: Taylor 18' m Herrick 27' c Cowan 66' m Con: Cookland 28'

Sixways

19 February 2022

Loughborough Lightning	28–25	Exeter Chiefs Women
Try: Jacoby 7' c Goldthorp 39' c Kabeya (2) 73' c, 79' c Con: Rowland (4) 8', 40', 74', 80'	Report	Try: Zackary 29' c O. Jones 47' m Rogers 59' c Con: Foster (2) 30', 60'; Pen: Foster (2) 44', 54'

Loughborough University

=== Round 15 ===
26 February 2022

Loughborough Lightning	19–19	Gloucester-Hartpury
Try: Svoboda 10' m Mataitoga 65' c Hunter 71' c Con: Rowland (2) 66', 72'	Report	Try: Tuipulotu 31' c Underwood 44' c H. Jones 75' m Con: Sing (2) 32', 45'

Loughborough University

26 February 2022

Bristol Bears Women	26–30	Saracens Women
Try: Marston 37' c Infante 53' c Butchers 62' m Bern 79' c Con: Reed (3) 38', 54', 80'	Report	Try: Kelter 24' c Corrigan 28' c Campbell 45' m P. Cleall 59' m Con: Kelter (2) 25', 29'; Pen: Kelter (2) 19', 70'

Shaftesbury Park

26 February 2022

Sale Sharks Women	14–53	Wasps Women
Try: Roberts 59' c Bawden 74' c Con: E. Duffy (2) 60', 75'	Report	Try: Boatman (3) 9' m, 51' m, 70' c Millar-Mills 13' m M. Jones (2) 22' m, 67' c Moloney (2) 27' c, 45' c Dow 38' m Con: M. Jones (4) 28', 46', 68', 71'

Hare Lane, Chester RUFC

26 February 2022

Exeter Chiefs Women	60–7	Worcester Warriors Women
Try: Doidge (3) 1' c, 10' m, 53' m Tuttosi (3) 6' c, 36' m, 58' c M. Hunt 25' m Detiveuax 28' c Zackary (2) 44' m, 79' c Con: Foster (5) 2', 7', 29', 59', 80'	Report	Try: Thompson 20' c Con: Murphy 21'

Sandy Park

26 February 2022

DMP Durham Sharks	5–48	Harlequins Women
Try: Phan 22' m	Report	Try: Cowell (2) 2' m, 7' m Dobson 20' c Beckett 25' c Harper 41' c Amory 43' m S. Brown 57' c Tuima 75' m Con: Green (4) 21', 26', 42', 58'

The Darlington Arena

=== Round 16 ===
5 March 2022

Wasps Women	30–14	Harlequins Women
Try: Muir 17' c Boatman 25' m B. Cleall 35' c Dow 50' m Con: M. Jones (2) 18', 36'; Pen: M. Jones (2) 5', 60'	Report	Try: Cowell 12' c Galligan 73' c Con: Green (2) 13', 74'

Twyford Avenue

5 March 2022

Saracens Women	41–33	Sale Sharks Women
Try: Corrigan 5' c Miell 8' m Clapp 13' m Jacobs 23' c Aitchison 26' c Kelter 41' c Con: Kelter (4) 6', 24', 27', 42'; Pen: Kelter 76'	Report	Try: Ounsley (2) 40' c, 54' m Benson 60' c Law 69' c V.E. Irwin 79' c Con: E. Duffy (4) 41', 61', 70', 80'

StoneX Stadium

5 March 2022

Bristol Bears Women	26–26	Loughborough Lightning
Try: West 2' c Joyce 4' c Marston 24' c K. Powell 36' m Con: Reed (3) 3', 5', 25'	Report	Try: Rowland 21' c Malcolm 31' m Davies 66' c Jacoby 72' c Con: Rowland (3) 22', 67', 73'

Shaftesbury Park

5 March 2022

Gloucester-Hartpury	15–12	Worcester Warriors Women
Try: Lewis 3' m Tuipulotu 39' c Con: Sing 40'; Pen: Sing 77'	Report	Try: McNaney 60' m Bricknell 68' c Con: Nicholas 69'

Hartpury University Stadium

5 March 2022

Exeter Chiefs Women	90–7	DMP Durham Sharks
Try: Zackary 1' m Rogers (2) 10' c, 28' c Detiveuax (4) 14' c, 21' c, 33' m, 60' c Doidge 39' c Kobayashi 42' c Holland 44' c Tuttosi 68' c Van der Velden 74' m Senft 76' c Allen 79' m Con: Foster (10) 11', 15', 23', 29', 40', 43', 45', 61', 69', 77'	Report	Try: Torley 47' c Con: Cookland 48'

Sandy Park

=== Round 17 ===
7 May 2022

Gloucester-Hartpury	36–7	Wasps Women
Try: N. Hunt 5' c N. Jones 7' c Lund 41' m Underwood 43' c Sing 79' c Con: Sing (4) 6', 8', 44', 80'; Pen: Sing 2'	Report	Try: Boatman 65' c Con: Goulden 66'

Hartpury University Stadium

7 May 2022

Bristol Bears Women	26–43	Harlequins Women
Try: Bern 30' c Burns 45' m Joyce 61' c Johnes 70' c Con: Reed (3) 31', 62', 71'	Report	Try: Kildunne 8' c Cokayne (3) 25' m, 34' m, 79' c Cowell 39' m S. Brown 42' c Breach 66' c Con: Blacklock 9'; Green (3) 43', 67', 80'

Ashton Gate

7 May 2022

Worcester Warriors Women	34–24	Loughborough Lightning
Try: Varley 20' c Keates 39' c Mattinson 53' c Phillips (2) 65' m, 72' m Con: Yamamoto (3) 21', 40', 54'; Pen: Yamamoto 10'	Report	Try: Malcolm 16' c Scarratt 27' c Gaffney 31' c Con: Scarratt (3) 17', 28', 32'

Sixways

7 May 2022

Exeter Chiefs Women	54–12	Saracens Women
Try: Rogers 6' c Doidge 9' c Emily Tuttosi 18' c F. Robinson 34' m Johnson 49' c Detiveuax 51' c Van der Velden 56' c Cantorna 75' c Con: Cantorna (7) 7', 10', 20', 50', 52', 57', 76'	Report	Try: Rettie 3' m Botterman 69' c Con: Kelter 70'

Sandy Park

7 May 2022

Sale Sharks Women	57–5	DMP Durham Sharks
Try: Lyons (2) 8' c, 39' c N. James 17' m Benson 24' c Hibbert-Jones (2) 29' m, 60' c Perrin 31' c V.E. Irwin 52' c Howard 78' m Con: E. Duffy (6) 9', 25', 32', 40', 53', 61'	Report	Try: M. James 79' m

Heywood Road

=== Round 18 ===
14 May 2022

Saracens Women	31–26	Wasps Women
Try: Corrigan 38' c M. Packer 51' m Campbell 55' m Aitchison 70' c Kelter 77' c Con: Kelter (3) 39', 71', 78'	Report	Try: Balogun 11' c B. Cleall 25' c Boatman 30' c Wilson-Hardy 43' m Con: F. Williams (3) 12', 26', 31'

StoneX Stadium

14 May 2022

Loughborough Lightning	22–17	Harlequins Women
Try: Mataitoga 12' m Rowland 21' m Kabeya 30' m Taufo'ou 73' c Con: Scarratt 74'	Report	Try: Beckett 18' m Mew 35' m Cornborough 66' c Con: Green 67'

Loughborough University

14 May 2022

Worcester Warriors Women	51–26	Sale Sharks Women
Try: Skeldon 5' m Laflin 16' m Shekells (2) 28' c, 55' m Farries (2) 36' c, 80' c Harries (2) 49' m, 75' m Cox 68' m Con: Yamamoto (3) 29', 37', 80+1'	Report	Try: Orrow 9' m Tonkin 21' c Benson 44' c E. Duffy 70' m Con: V.A. Irwin (2) 22', 45'; E. Duffy 71'

Sixways

14 May 2022

Exeter Chiefs Women	29–26	Bristol Bears Women
Try: Detiveuax (2) 11' m, 36' m Zackary (2) 52' c, 65' m Tutossi 70' c Con: Cantorna (2) 53', 71'	Report	Try: Crompton 29' c Bern 39' c Keight 58' m Burgess 78' c Con: Reed (3) 30', 40', 79'

Sandy Park

14 May 2022

DMP Durham Sharks	0–67	Gloucester-Hartpury
	Report	Try: Underwood (4) 2' c, 29' c, 72' c, 76' m George 7' c Lewis 15' c Aldcroft 21' m Lake 27' m Lund 45' c Sing 50' m L. Scott 64' m Con: Sing (6) 3', 8', 16', 30', 46', 73'

The Darlington Arena

== Play-offs ==
Semi-finals
1	Saracens Women	30
4	Harlequins Women	10
2	Exeter Chiefs Women	28
3	Bristol Bears Women	24

Final
1	Saracens Women	43
2	Exeter Chiefs Women	21

=== Semi-finals ===
22 May 2022
14:00

Saracens Women	30–10	Harlequins Women
Try: P. Cleall (2) 14' m, 40+2' c M. Packer 19' c Campbell 44' m Con: Kelter (2/4) 20', 40+3'; Pen: Kelter (2/3) 26', 63'	Report	Try: Breach 32' m Cokayne 78' m

StoneX Stadium
Attendance: 2,139
Referee: Nikki O’Donnell (RFU)

Team details

FB	15	(England) Sarah McKenna
RW	14	(Canada) Alysha Corrigan		(substituted off) 77'
OC	13	(England) Cara Wardle
IC	12	(United States) Alev Kelter	(yellow card) 30' to 40'
LW	11	(United States) Lotte Clapp (cc)		(substituted off) 77'
FH	10	(England) Holly Aitchison
SH	9	(England) Ella Wyrwas		(substituted off) 77'
N8	8	(England) Marlie Packer (cc)		(substituted off) 74'
OF	7	(England) Vicky Fleetwood
BF	6	(Canada) Mackenzie Carson
RL	5	(England) Poppy Cleall
LL	4	(England) Fiona McIntosh		(substituted off) 71'
TP	3	(England) Kelsey Clifford		(substituted off) 54'
HK	2	(England) May Campbell	(yellow card) 56' to 66'	(substituted off) 77'
LP	1	(England) Hannah Botterman		(substituted off) 77'
Substitutions:
HK	16	(Wales) Kat Evans		(substituted on) 77'
PR	17	(Wales) Donna Rose		(substituted on) 77'
PR	18	(Canada) Alex Ellis		(substituted on) 54'
LK	19	(England) Sonia Green		(substituted on) 71'
FL	20	(Scotland) Jodie Rettie		(substituted on) 74'
SH	21	(England) Anna Goddard		(substituted on) 77'
CE	22	(England) Lucy Biggs		(substituted on) 77'
WG	23	(England) Tilly Vaughan-Fowler		(substituted on) 77'
Coach:
(England) Alex Austerberry

FB	15	(England) Ellie Kildunne	(substituted off) 71'
RW	14	(England) Heather Cowell	(substituted off) 67'
OC	13	(England) Lagi Tuima
IC	12	(England) Rachael Burford (c)
LW	11	(England) Jess Breach
FH	10	(England) Emily Scott
SH	9	(England) Lucy Packer	(substituted off) 65'
N8	8	(England) Sarah Beckett
OF	7	(England) Amelia Harper	(substituted off) 47'
BF	6	(England) Katy Mew	(substituted off) 71'
RL	5	(Scotland) Sarah Bonar
LL	4	(England) Rosie Galligan	(substituted off) 71'
TP	3	(England) Shaunagh Brown	(substituted off) 71'
HK	2	(England) Amy Cokayne
LP	1	(England) Vickii Cornborough	(substituted off) 48'
Substitutions:
HK	16	(England) Elle Bloor	(substituted on) 71'
PR	17	(Sweden) Tove Viksten	(substituted on) 48'
PR	18	(England) Chloe Edwards	(substituted on) 71'
LK	19	(England) Fiona Fletcher	(substituted on) 71'
FL	20	(England) Lauren Brooks	(substituted on) 47'
SH	21	(England) Freya Aucken	(substituted on) 65'
CE	22	(England) Ellie Green	(substituted on) 71'
WG	23	(England) Izzy Mayhew	(substituted on) 67'
Coach:
(Ireland) Gerard Mullen

Player of the Match:
(England) Poppy Cleall (Saracens Women)

22 May 2022
16:30

Exeter Chiefs Women	28–24	Bristol Bears Women
Try: Rogers (2) 6' c, 21' c Van der Velden 10' c Detiveaux 77' c Con: Cantorna (4/4) 7', 11', 22', 79'	Report	Try: West (2) 25' m, 73' m Bevan 36' c Murray 55' c Con: Reed (2/4) 37', 57'

Sandy Park
Attendance: 2,564
Referee: Charlie Gayther (RFU)

Team details

FB	15	(England) Merryn Doidge
RW	14	(Scotland) Eilidh Sinclair
OC	13	(Japan) Kanako Kobayashi
IC	12	(United States) Gabby Cantorna
LW	11	(United States) Jennine Detiveaux
FH	10	(Spain) Patricia García	(substituted off) 68'
SH	9	(England) Flo Robinson
N8	8	(United States) Kate Zackary (cc)
OF	7	(United States) Rachel Johnson
BF	6	(England) Poppy Leitch (cc)
RL	5	(Netherlands) Linde van der Velden	(substituted off) 57'
LL	4	(Ireland) Nichola Fryday	(substituted off) 57'
TP	3	(Canada) DaLeaka Menin
HK	2	(Canada) Emily Tuttosi
LP	1	(United States) Hope Rogers	(substituted off) 68'
Substitutions:
HK	16	(Ireland) Clara Nielson
LK	17	(Canada) McKinley Hunt	(substituted on) 57'
PR	18	(England) Michaella Roberts
LK	19	(England) Ebony Jefferies	(substituted on) 57'
PR	20	(Canada) Gabrielle Senft	(substituted on) 68'
SH	21	(England) Brooke Bradley
FH	22	(United States) Megan Foster	(substituted on) 68'
WG	23	(Hong Kong) Nancy McGillivray
Coach:
(England) Susie Appleby

FB	15	(Wales) Kayleigh Powell
RW	14	(England) Jenny Hesketh
OC	13	(England) Phoebe Murray
IC	12	(England) Amber Reed (cc)
LW	11	(Wales) Courtney Keight
FH	10	(England) Lucie Skuse	(substituted off) 54'
SH	9	(Wales) Keira Bevan	(substituted off) 54'
N8	8	(Wales) Siwan Lillicrap	(substituted off) 64'
OF	7	(Wales) Manon Johnes
BF	6	(Wales) Alisha Butchers
RL	5	(England) Abbie Ward (cc)
LL	4	(England) Delaney Burns	(substituted off) 69'
TP	3	(England) Sarah Bern
HK	2	(England) Hannah West
LP	1	(England) Simi Pam	(substituted off) 75'
Substitutions:
HK	16	(England) Holly Phillips
PR	17	(England) China-Marie Kill	(substituted on) 75'
PR	18	(England) Ellie Mulhearn	(substituted on) 64'
LK	19	(Wales) Natalia John	(substituted on) 69'
FL	20	(England) Gabriella Nigrelli
SH	21	(England) Lucy Burgess	(substituted on) 54'
FH	22	(Wales) Elinor Snowsill	(substituted on) 54'
WG	23	(England) Ella Lovibond
Coach:
(England) Dave Ward

Player of the Match:
(United States) Hope Rogers (Exeter Chiefs Women)

=== Final ===
3 June 2022
15:00

Saracens Women	43–21	Exeter Chiefs Women
Try: M. Packer (2) 6' c, 40+1' c Fleetwood 22' c Carson 42' c Campbell 62' c Corrigan 66' m Con: Kelter (5/6) 7', 23', 40+3', 43', 63'; Pen: Kelter (1/1) 30'	Report	Try: García 25' c Detiveaux 56' c Jefferies 71' c Con: Cantorna (3/3) 26', 57', 72'

Sixways
Attendance: 3,288
Referee: Harry Walbaum (RFU)

FB	15	(England) Sarah McKenna
RW	14	(Canada) Alysha Corrigan	(substituted off) 77'
OC	13	(England) Cara Wardle	(substituted off) 67'
IC	12	(United States) Alev Kelter
LW	11	(United States) Lotte Clapp (cc)
FH	10	(England) Holly Aitchison
SH	9	(England) Ella Wyrwas	(substituted off) 77'
N8	8	(England) Marlie Packer (cc)
OF	7	(England) Vicky Fleetwood
BF	6	(Canada) Mackenzie Carson	(substituted off) 67'
RL	5	(England) Poppy Cleall	(substituted off) 75'
LL	4	(England) Fiona McIntosh
TP	3	(England) Kelsey Clifford	(substituted off) 53'
HK	2	(England) May Campbell	(substituted off) 75'
LP	1	(England) Hannah Botterman	(substituted off) 75'
Substitutions:
HK	16	(Wales) Kat Evans	(substituted on) 75'
PR	17	(Wales) Donna Rose	(substituted on) 75'
PR	18	(Canada) Alex Ellis	(substituted on) 53'
LK	19	(England) Sonia Green	(substituted on) 75'
FL	20	(Wales) Georgia Evans	(substituted on) 67'
SH	21	(England) Anna Goddard	(substituted on) 77'
CE	22	(Ireland) Hannah Casey	(substituted on) 67'
WG	23	(England) Tilly Vaughan-Fowler	(substituted on) 77'
Coach:
(England) Alex Austerberry

FB	15	(England) Merryn Doidge
RW	14	(Scotland) Eilidh Sinclair
OC	13	(Japan) Kanako Kobayashi
IC	12	(United States) Gabby Cantorna	(substituted off) 67'
LW	11	(United States) Jennine Detiveaux
FH	10	(Spain) Patricia García	(substituted off) 62'
SH	9	(England) Flo Robinson	(substituted off) 67'
N8	8	(United States) Kate Zackary (cc)
OF	7	(United States) Rachel Johnson	(substituted off) 66'
BF	6	(England) Poppy Leitch (cc)
RL	5	(Netherlands) Linde van der Velden	(substituted off) 46'
LL	4	(Ireland) Nichola Fryday	(substituted off) 46'
TP	3	(Canada) DaLeaka Menin	(substituted off) 73'
HK	2	(Canada) Emily Tuttosi	(substituted off) 66'
LP	1	(United States) Hope Rogers
Substitutions:
HK	16	(Ireland) Clara Nielson	(substituted on) 66'
LK	17	(Canada) McKinley Hunt	(substituted on) 46'
PR	18	(England) Michaella Roberts	(substituted on) 73'
PR	19	(Canada) Gabrielle Senft	(substituted on) 66'
LK	20	(England) Ebony Jefferies	(substituted on) 46'
SH	21	(England) Brooke Bradley	(substituted on) 67'
FH	22	(United States) Megan Foster	(substituted on) 62'
WG	23	(Hong Kong) Nancy McGillivray	(substituted on) 67'
Coach:
(England) Susie Appleby

Player of the Match:
(England) Marlie Packer (Saracens Women)

== Leading scorers ==
=== Most points ===
As of 12 December 2021

Rank	Player	Club	Points
1	(England) Zoe Harrison	Saracens	85
2	(England) Emma Sing	Gloucester-Hartpury	70
3	(England) Lagi Tuima	Harlequins	53
4	(England) Ellie Kildunne	Harlequins	45
4	(England) Lark Davies	Loughborough Lightning	45
6	(England) Helena Rowland	Loughborough Lightning	43
7	(England) Hannah West	Bristol Bears	40
7	(Wales) Courtney Keight	Bristol Bears	40
7	(England) Ellie Boatman	Wasps	40
7	(Wales) Flo Williams	Wasps	40

=== Most tries ===
As of 12 December 2021

Rank	Player	Club	Tries
1	(England) Ellie Kildunne	Harlequins	9
1	(England) Lark Davies	Loughborough Lightning	9
3	(England) Hannah West	Bristol Bears	8
3	(Wales) Courtney Keight	Bristol Bears	8
3	(England) Ellie Boatman	Wasps	8
6	(England) Phoebe Murray	Bristol Bears	7
6	(England) Ellie Underwood	Gloucester-Hartpury	7
8	(England) Kelly Smith	Gloucester-Hartpury	6
8	(England) Connie Powell	Gloucester-Hartpury	6
10	(England) Abigail Dow	Wasps	5
10	(England) Zoe Harrison	Saracens	5

== Team of the Season ==
The 2021–22 Allianz Premier 15s Team of the Season, which was revealed on 29 June, features players from seven different clubs and three different nationalities. The team was selected by a panel of five media experts–Jessica Hayden, Nick Heath, Kat Merchant, Sara Orchard and Fiona Thomas.

Forwards
Number	Position	Player	Club
1	Prop	(United States) Hope Rogers	Exeter Chiefs
2	Hooker	(England) Lark Davies	Loughborough Lightning
3	Prop	(England) Sarah Bern	Bristol Bears
4	Lock	(England) Rosie Galligan	Harlequins
5	Lock	(England) Abbie Ward	Bristol Bears
6	Flanker	(Wales) Alisha Butchers	Bristol Bears
7	Flanker	(England) Marlie Packer	Saracens
8	Number 8	(United States) Kate Zackary	Exeter Chiefs

Backs
Number	Position	Player	Club
9	Scrum-Half	(England) Ella Wyrwas	Saracens
10	Fly-Half	(England) Helena Rowland	Loughborough Lightning
11	Wing	(Wales) Jasmine Joyce	Bristol Bears
12	Centre	(United States) Alev Kelter	Saracens
13	Centre	(England) Holly Aitchison	Saracens
14	Wing	(England) Ellie Boatman	Wasps
15	Full-Back	(England) Emma Sing	Gloucester-Hartpury

== Allianz Cup ==
2021–22 Allianz Cup

Tournament details
- Countries: England
- Tournament format(s): Round-robin and knockout
- Date: 30 October 2021 — 22 April 2022

Tournament statistics
- Teams: 10

Final
- Champions: Exeter Chiefs (1st title)
- Runners-up: Harlequins

The Allianz Cup saw the Premier 15s clubs ranked by their previous finishing position and drawn in two pools of five, with clubs playing each other once in two home games, two away games, one bye week over five rounds.

The top two teams in each pool will progress to the semi-finals played at the highest ranked clubs’ venues (16 April 2022) as well a third-placed play-off and final (both 22 April 2022). The Allianz Cup final will be played at the home venue of the winning semi-finalist club with the highest points’ difference.

The bottom four ranked teams will enter fifth, seventh and ninth placed play-off finals with the home team once again determined by stage one league tables. The Cup competition also gives greater exposure to every Allianz Premier 15s round.

=== Pool 1 ===
Pool 1
Pos	Team	Pld	W	D	L	PF	PA	PD	TB	LB	Pts	Qualification
1	Harlequins Women	3	3	0	0	134	31	+103	3	0	15	Semi-finals
2	Gloucester-Hartpury	2	1	0	1	43	34	+9	1	0	5	Semi-finals
3	Bristol Bears Women	2	1	0	1	45	41	+4	1	0	5	5th/6th-place play-off
4	Wasps Women	2	0	0	2	29	72	−43	0	0	0	7th/8th-place play-off
5	DMP Durham Sharks	1	0	0	1	0	73	−73	0	0	0	9th/10th-place play-off

Rules for classification: If teams are level at any stage, tiebreakers are applied in the following order:
1. Number of matches won
2. Difference between points for and against
3. Total number of points for
4. Total number of tries scored

==== Round 1 ====
30 October 2021
15:00

DMP Durham Sharks	0–73	Harlequins Women (1 BP)
	Report	Try: Brown 3' m Fletcher 8' c Wellbelove 12' c L. Packer 15' c Catlin (2) 22' c, 47' c Edwards 27' c Bloor (2) 33' c, 77' c Scott 66' m Comerford 80' c Con: Green (9) 9', 13', 16', 23', 28', 34', 48', 78', 80+1'

The Darlington Arena

30 October 2021
16:45

(1 BP) Gloucester-Hartpury	31–12	Bristol Bears Women
Try: Underwood (2) 10' m, 25' m Caplice 35' c Lund (2) 51' c, 75' c Con: George (3) 36', 52', 76'	Report	Try: Nigrelli 40' m Burgess 47' c Con: Skuse 48'

Hartpury University Stadium

Bye/s: Wasps Women

==== Round 2 ====
6 November 2021
14:00

(1 BP) Bristol Bears Women	33–10	Wasps Women
Try: Lovibond 18' c Phillips (2) 23' m, 32' c Nigrelli 49' c Pam 55' c Con: Skuse (4) 19', 33', 50', 56'	Report	Try: C. Williams 58' m Boatman 79' m

Shaftesbury Park

6 November 2021
14:00

(1 BP) Harlequins Women	29–12	Gloucester-Hartpury
Try: Catlin 3' c Cowell (2) 18' c, 37' m Amory 42' c Con: Green (2) 4', 19'; Scott 43'; Pen: Green 11'	Report	Try: Smith 55' m

Twickenham Stoop

Bye/s: DMP Durham Sharks

==== Round 3 ====
13 November 2021
14:00

Wasps Women	19–39	Harlequins Women (1 BP)
	Report

Twyford Avenue

13 November 2021
14:00

Gloucester-Hartpury	C–C	DMP Durham Sharks

Hartpury University Stadium

Bye/s: Bristol Bears Women

==== Round 4 ====
26 March 2022

Harlequins Women	12–31	Bristol Bears Women
	Report

Twickenham Stoop

26 March 2022

DMP Durham Sharks	14–42	Wasps Women
	Report

The Darlington Arena

Bye/s: Gloucester-Hartpury

==== Round 5 ====
2 April 2022

Wasps Women	35–20	Gloucester-Hartpury
	Report

Twyford Avenue

2 April 2022

Bristol Bears Women	53–10	DMP Durham Sharks
	Report

Shaftesbury Park

Bye/s: Harlequins Women

=== Pool 2 ===
Pool 2
Pos	Team	Pld	W	D	L	PF	PA	PD	TB	LB	Pts	Qualification
1	Saracens Women	3	2	0	1	53	29	+24	2	0	10	Semi-finals
2	Exeter Chiefs Women	2	2	0	0	53	14	+39	1	0	9	Semi-finals
3	Sale Sharks Women	3	1	0	2	45	62	−17	1	0	5	5th/6th-place play-off
4	Worcester Warriors Women	2	1	0	1	31	34	−3	0	0	4	7th/8th-place play-off
5	Loughborough Lightning	2	0	0	2	24	67	−43	0	0	0	9th/10th-place play-off

Rules for classification: If teams are level at any stage, tiebreakers are applied in the following order:
1. Number of matches won
2. Difference between points for and against
3. Total number of points for
4. Total number of tries scored

==== Round 1 ====
30 October 2021
14:00

(1 BP) Sale Sharks Women	43–15	Loughborough Lightning
	Report

Heywood Road

31 October 2021
14:00

Worcester Warriors Women	17–0	Saracens Women
	Report

Sixways

Bye/s: Exeter Chiefs Women

==== Round 2 ====
6 November 2021
13:00

Loughborough Lightning	12–22	Saracens Women (1 BP)
	Report

Loughborough University

6 November 2021
14:00

Sale Sharks Women	0–19	Exeter Chiefs Women
	Report

Heywood Road

Bye/s: Worcester Warriors Women

==== Round 3 ====
14 November 2021
13:00

(1 BP) Exeter Chiefs Women	34–14	Worcester Warriors Women
	Report

Sandy Park

14 November 2021
13:30

(1 BP) Saracens Women	31–0	Sale Sharks Women
	Report

StoneX Stadium

Bye/s: Loughborough Lightning

==== Round 4 ====
26 March 2022

Exeter Chiefs Women	47–15	Loughborough Lightning
	Report

Sandy Park

26 March 2022

Worcester Warriors Women	43–5	Sale Sharks Women
	Report

Sixways

Bye/s: Saracens Women

==== Round 5 ====
2 April 2022

Saracens Women	C–C	Exeter Chiefs Women

StoneX Stadium

2 April 2022

Loughborough Lightning	27–34	Worcester Warriors Women
	Report

Loughborough University

Bye/s: Sale Sharks Women
