= List of 2022–23 Premier 15s transfers =

This is a list of player transfers involving Allianz Premier 15s teams before or during the 2022–23 season.

The list is of deals that are confirmed and are either from or to a rugby union team competing in the Premier 15s during the 2021–22 season. It is not unknown for confirmed deals to be cancelled at a later date.

== Bristol Bears ==
=== Players in ===
- (England) Lark Davies from (England) Loughborough Lightning
- (England) Chris Balogun from (England) Wasps
- (Wales) Gwenllian Pyrs from (England) Sale Sharks
- (Wales) Megan Davies from (England) Exeter Chiefs
- (Ireland) Claire Molloy from (England) Wasps
- (England) Beth Stafford from (England) Sale Sharks
- (England) Megan Barwick from (England) Bath
- (England) Reneeqa Bonner (promoted from Academy)
- (England) Bo Osborne-Clark (promoted from Academy)
- (England) Lauren Powell (promoted from Academy)
- (England) Tillie Westwood (promoted from Academy)
- (England) Grace White (promoted from Academy)
- (England) Rosie Inman from (England) DMP Durham Sharks
- (Scotland) Lyndsay O'Donnell from (England) Worcester Warriors (season-long loan)
- (England) Deborah Wills from (England) Worcester Warriors (short-term loan)

=== Players out ===
- (Wales) Siwan Lillicrap to (England) Gloucester-Hartpury
- (England) Leanne Infante to (England) Saracens
- (Wales) Natalia John to (England) Worcester Warriors
- (Wales) Rhi Parker to (Wales) Llandaff North
- (Wales) Robyn Lock (retired)
- (England) China-Marie Kill (released)
- (England) Sophie Phillips (released)
- (England) Lillian Stoeger-Goddard (released)
- (England) Hannah Sims to (England) Harlequins

== DMP Durham Sharks ==
=== Players in ===
- (England) Ella Brewster from (England) Loughborough Students
- (England) Laura Chapman (unattached)
- (England) Tilly Churm from (England) Worcester Warriors
- (England) Georgina Holmes from (England) Harrogate
- (England) Saskia Janzen (unattached)
- (England) Christine Lofthouse-Pratt from (England) Harrogate
- (England) Rianna Manson from (England) Harrogate
- (England) Chantelle Miller from (England) British Army
- (England) Chrissi Nettleton (unattached)
- (England) Susie Badger from (England) Royal Navy
- (England) Jess Clabby (unattached)
- (England) Kathryn Craine from (England) Sale Sharks
- (England) Georgia Dolan (unattached)
- (England) Molly Gardener (unattached)
- (England) Olivia Howarth from (England) Harrogate
- (England) Karolina Kacirkova from (England) Hull Ionians
- (England) Summer O'Brien (unattached)
- (England) Meg Riley (unattached)
- (England) Josie Scrimgour from (England) Penrith
- (United States) Olivia Ortiz from (United States) Colorado Gray Wolves
- (United States) Tess Feury from (England) Wasps
- (Scotland) Elis Martin from (Scotland) Edinburgh University
- (United States) Meya Bizer from (United States) Beantown
- (United States) Kathryn Treder from (United States) Beantown
- (United States) Rachel Ehrecke from (United States) Colorado Gray Wolves

=== Players out ===
- (Scotland) Abi Evans to (England) Saracens
- (England) Cara Cookland to (England) Sale Sharks
- (England) Alana Bainbridge to (England) Wasps
- (England) Amy Layzell to (England) Wasps
- (England) Caitlin Simpson to (England) Wasps
- (England) Lauren Torley to (England) Harlequins
- (England) Rosie Inman to (England) Bristol Bears
- (England) Lucy Thorpe to (England) Harlequins

== Exeter Chiefs ==
=== Players in ===
- (England) Claudia MacDonald from (England) Wasps
- (Ireland) Cliodhna Moloney from (England) Wasps
- (Australia) Halley Derera from (Australia) Brumbies
- (United States) Charli Jacoby from (England) Loughborough Lightning
- (New Zealand) Liv McGoverne from (New Zealand) Matatū
- (Italy) Silvia Turani from (Italy) Colorno
- (England) Charlotte Gale from (England) Exeter College
- (England) Isabella Hartley from (England) Exeter College
- (England) Danielle Preece from (England) Exeter College
- (England) Evie Walker from (England) Exeter College
- (England) Tilly Ryall from (England) Hartpury College
- (Australia) Lori Cramer from (Australia) NSW Waratahs
- (Ireland) Edel McMahon from (England) Wasps
- (England) Jodie Ounsley from (England) Sale Sharks
- (Australia) Michaela Leonard from (Australia) Brumbies
- (Scotland) Panashe Muzambe from (Scotland) Watsonians
- (Wales) Robyn Wilkins from (England) Gloucester-Hartpury

=== Players out ===
- (Spain) Patricia García (retired)
- (Wales) Megan Davies to (England) Bristol Bears
- (England) Olivia Jones to (England) Gloucester-Hartpury
- (Spain) Laura Delgado to (England) Gloucester-Hartpury
- (England) Louise Burgess (released)
- (England) Olivia Churcher (released)
- (England) Grace Eckford (released)
- (England) Daisy French (released)
- (England) Lottie Holland (released)
- (Canada) McKinley Hunt (released)
- (Japan) Sachiko Kato (released)
- (Japan) Kanako Kobayashi (released)
- (England) Lauren Leatherland (released)
- (England) Garnet Mackinder (released)
- (England) Alia McCarthy (released)
- (Wales) Niamh Terry (released)
- (England) Jess Thomas (released)
- (Wales) Caitlin Lewis to (England) Gloucester-Hartpury
- Zintle Mpupha to South Africa Sevens
- (Scotland) Chloe Rollie to (England) Loughborough Lightning
- (England) Jodie Ounsley (released)

== Gloucester-Hartpury ==
=== Players in ===
- (England) Maud Muir from (England) Wasps
- (England) Alex Matthews from (England) Worcester Warriors
- (Wales) Siwan Lillicrap from (England) Bristol Bears
- (England) Olivia Jones from (England) Exeter Chiefs
- (Spain) Laura Delgado from (England) Exeter Chiefs
- (England) Lizzie Goulden from (England) Wasps
- (Ireland) Sam Monaghan from (England) Wasps
- (England) Sarah Beckett from (England) Harlequins
- (Wales) Caitlin Lewis from (England) Exeter Chiefs
- (Wales) Kate Williams from (New Zealand) North Harbour Hibiscus

=== Players out ===
- (Ireland) Anna Caplice (released)
- (United States) Kristine Sommer (released)
- (England) Shya Pinnock to (England) Wasps
- (Wales) Robyn Wilkins to (England) Exeter Chiefs

== Harlequins ==
=== Players in ===
- (England) Ellie Boatman from (England) Wasps
- (Australia) Emily Chancellor from (Australia) NSW Waratahs
- (Australia) Bella McKenzie from (Australia) NSW Waratahs
- (England) Lauren Torley from (England) DMP Durham Sharks
- (Australia) Kaitlan Leaney from (Australia) NSW Waratahs
- (England) Bryony Cleall from (England) Wasps
- (France) Lénaïg Corson from (England) Wasps
- (England) Grace Clavering (promoted from Academy)
- (England) Carys Graham (promoted from Academy)
- (England) Eloise Harris (promoted from Academy)
- (England) Lucy Heryet (promoted from Academy)
- (England) Lucy Hoad (promoted from Academy)
- (England) Kira Leat (promoted from Academy)
- (England) Sophie Molton (promoted from Academy)
- (England) Ellie Roberts (promoted from Academy)
- (England) Katie Shillaker (promoted from Academy)
- (England) Sophie Stafford (promoted from Academy)
- (England) Abby Dow from (England) Wasps
- (England) Hannah Sims from (England) Bristol Bears
- Babalwa Latsha from South Africa Sevens
- (England) Rowena Burnfield from (England) Wasps
- (England) Lucy Thorpe from (England) DMP Durham Sharks

=== Players out ===
- (England) Fi Fletcher (retired)
- (England) Jess Breach to (England) Saracens
- (England) Sarah Beckett to (England) Gloucester-Hartpury
- (England) Polly Roberts to (England) Wasps
- (Sweden) Tove Viksten (retired)
- (England) Shaunagh Brown (retired)

== Loughborough Lightning ==
=== Players in ===
- (England) Daisy Hibbert-Jones from (England) Sale Sharks
- (Wales) Molly Kelly from (England) Sale Sharks
- (Scotland) Chloe Rollie from (England) Exeter Chiefs

=== Players out ===
- (England) Lark Davies to (England) Bristol Bears
- (United States) Charli Jacoby to (England) Exeter Chiefs
- (Scotland) Isla Alejandro to (England) Saracens
- (England) Iona Antwis to (England) Sale Sharks
- (Wales) Eloise Hayward to (England) Wasps
- (England) Sarah Hunter (retired)

== Sale Sharks ==
=== Players in ===
- (United States) Alycia Washington from (England) Worcester Warriors
- (England) Iona Antwis from (England) Loughborough Lightning
- (England) Cara Cookland from (England) DMP Durham Sharks
- (England) Sophie Jones from (England) Waterloo
- (England) Kay Searcy from (England) Wasps
- (England) Niamh Swales from (England) Gateshead College
- (Italy) Sara Tounesi from (France) Clermont Auvergne
- (United States) Carly Waters from (England) Saracens
- (United States) Eti Haungatau from (United States) Lindenwood University

=== Players out ===
- (Wales) Gwenllian Pyrs to (England) Bristol Bears
- (England) Beth Stafford to (England) Bristol Bears
- (England) Daisy Hibbert-Jones to (England) Loughborough Lightning
- (Wales) Molly Kelly to (England) Loughborough Lightning
- (England) Jodie Ounsley to (England) Exeter Chiefs
- (England) Kathryn Craine to (England) DMP Durham Sharks

== Saracens ==
=== Players in ===
- (England) Leanne Infante from (England) Bristol Bears
- (Ireland) Grace Moore from (Ireland) Railway Union
- (Ireland) Taryn Schutzler from (Ireland) Ulster
- (England) Jess Breach from (England) Harlequins
- (Scotland) Louise McMillan from (Scotland) Hillhead Jordanhill
- (Scotland) Abi Evans from (England) DMP Durham Sharks
- (Scotland) Isla Alejandro from (England) Loughborough Lightning
- (England) Eloise Bloomfield from (England) Old Albanians (dual registered)
- (England) Kirsty Exley from (England) Old Albanians (dual registered)
- (England) Chloe Flanagan from (England) Oaklands College (promoted from Academy)
- (England) Mica Gooding from (England) Old Albanians (dual registered)
- (England) Katie Johnson from (England) Oaklands College (promoted from Academy)
- (England) Sharifa Kasolo from (England) Blackheath (dual registered)
- (England) Lizzie Musa from (France) Stade Rennais
- (England) Flo Long from (England) Worcester Warriors (short-term loan)
- (England) Mica Evans from (England) Wasps
- (Wales) Flo Williams from (England) Wasps
- (Canada) Maya Montiel from (Canada) University of Ottawa
- (Wales) Rebecca De Filippo (unattached)

=== Players out ===
- (England) Tamara Taylor (retired)
- (United States) Carly Waters to (England) Sale Sharks
- (England) Katie Barnes (released)
- (England) Ellie Lennon to (England) Wasps
- (England) Tilly Vaughan-Fowler to (England) Wasps
- (Fiji) Rachel Laqeretabua to (Australia) Western Force
- Alev Kelter to United States Sevens
- (Wales) Kat Evans to (England) Wasps (short-term loan)
- (England) Chloe Flanagan to (England) Wasps (short-term loan)
- (England) Vicky Fleetwood (retired)

== University of Worcester Warriors ==
=== Players in ===
- (Wales) Natalia John from (England) Bristol Bears
- (Wales) Lowri Norkett from (Wales) Ospreys
- (Scotland) Evie Gallagher from (Scotland) Stirling County
- (Ireland) Siobhán McCarthy from (Ireland) Railway Union

=== Players out ===
- (New Zealand) Lisa Campbell (retired)
- (England) Alex Matthews to (England) Gloucester-Hartpury
- (England) Ursula Hardy (released)
- (Wales) Lowri Williams (released)
- (United States) Alycia Washington to (England) Sale Sharks
- (England) Tilly Churm to (England) DMP Durham Sharks
- (England) Flo Long to (England) Saracens (short-term loan)
- (Scotland) Lyndsay O'Donnell to (England) Bristol Bears (season-long loan)
- (England) Deborah Wills to (England) Bristol Bears (short-term loan)

== Wasps ==
=== Players in ===
- (Spain) Cris Blanco from (Spain) Olímpico de Pozuelo
- (Wales) Eloise Hayward from (England) Loughborough Lightning
- (France) Lénaïg Corson from (France) Stade Français
- (England) Alana Bainbridge from (England) DMP Durham Sharks
- (Scotland) Fiona Cooper from (Scotland) Corstorphine Cougars
- (England) Amy Layzell from (England) DMP Durham Sharks
- (England) Ellie Lennon from (England) Saracens
- (England) Shya Pinnock from (England) Gloucester-Hartpury
- (England) Polly Roberts from (England) Harlequins
- (England) Molly Saunders from (England) Richmond
- (England) Caitlin Simpson from (England) DMP Durham Sharks
- (England) Tilly Vaughan-Fowler from (England) Saracens
- (England) Georgia Wood from (England) London Irish Wild Geese
- (Wales) Kat Evans from (England) Saracens (short-term loan)
- (England) Chloe Flanagan from (England) Saracens (short-term loan)

=== Players out ===
- (England) Chris Balogun to (England) Bristol Bears
- (England) Maud Muir to (England) Gloucester-Hartpury
- (Ireland) Claire Molloy to (England) Bristol Bears
- (England) Lizzie Goulden to (England) Gloucester-Hartpury
- (England) Claudia MacDonald to (England) Exeter Chiefs
- (Ireland) Cliodhna Moloney to (England) Exeter Chiefs
- (England) Ellie Boatman to (England) Harlequins
- (Ireland) Sam Monaghan to (England) Gloucester-Hartpury
- (Ireland) Edel McMahon to (England) Exeter Chiefs
- (England) Kay Searcy to (England) Sale Sharks
- (England) Bryony Cleall to (England) Harlequins
- (France) Lénaïg Corson to (England) Harlequins
- (England) Mica Evans to (England) Saracens
- (Wales) Flo Williams to (England) Saracens
- (England) Abby Dow to (England) Harlequins
- (United States) Tess Feury to (England) DMP Durham Sharks
- (England) Rowena Burnfield to (England) Harlequins
