= Lizzie Hanlon =

England international rugby union player

- Born: 30 July 2001 (age 25)
- Height: 168 cm (5 ft 6 in)

Rugby union career
- Position: Tighthead prop
- Current team: Harlequins
Youth career
- Sutton & Epsom
Senior career
Years	Team	Apps	(Points)
2022–2024	Exeter Chiefs Women		
2024–	Harlequins		
2024–	England		

Lizzie Hanlon (born 30 July 2001) is an English rugby union player. She is a member of the England women's national rugby union team and plays for Harlequins in the Premier 15s.

== International career ==
Hanlon made her England debut in April 2024, earning selection for the 88–10 win over Ireland at Allianz Stadium. She was awarded a Red Roses transition contract for the 2024–25 season.

== Club career ==
Hanlon joined Sutton & Epsom RFC at the age of 15 before moving to Devon to study at the University of Exeter. After impressing in BUCS Rugby for Exeter University, she signed for Exeter Chiefs Women in 2022–23, making her first appearance against DMP Sharks. She joined Harlequins ahead of the 2024–25 season.

== Early life and education ==
Hanlon was a competitive diver as a teenager before pursuing rugby. She studied at the University of Exeter.
