= Elinor Snowsill =

Wales international rugby union player

- Born: 27 June 1989 (age 37) Ascot, Berkshire
- Height: 1.66 m (5.4 ft)
- Weight: 62 kg (9.8 st)
- University: Loughborough University

Rugby union career
- Position: Fly-half
- Current team: Bristol Bears
Amateur team(s)
Years	Team	Apps	(Points)
- Newport Gwent Dragons
International career
Years	Team	Apps	(Points)
2009–2023	Wales	76	
- Correct as of 2 January 2018

Elinor Snowsill (born 27 June 1989) is a Welsh rugby union player who plays as a fly-half for Bristol Bears. She made her debut for Wales against Sweden in 2009, earning 76 caps before her international retirement in August 2023.

== Club career ==
Snowsill began her rugby career with Cardiff Harlequins, playing two matches for the club on the wing. She later played for Newport Gwent Dragons before moving to Bristol Bears.

== International career ==
Snowsill captained the Wales women's national under-20 rugby union team, before making her debut as a fly-half for the senior team in 2009 against Sweden. She eventually earned 76 caps.

In April 2019, she played for British invitational rugby union club The Barbarians against the USA – a match she said at the time was "the best rugby experience I've ever had."

Snowsill became known on social media, alongside fellow Bristol Bears player Amber Reed, for a viral video showing a training ground routine involving a complicated trick shot. She was selected in Wales squad for the 2021 Rugby World Cup in New Zealand.

== Personal life ==
Born in Ascot, England to a Welsh mother and English father, Snowsill and her family relocated to Cardiff when she was seven.

As a youngster she excelled at football and represented Wales at age-grade level, only picking up a rugby ball aged 15 when a teacher at her school organised a girls' touch team. At the relatively late age of 19, Snowsill made the decision to focus exclusively on rugby.

She graduated from Loughborough University in 2010 with a 2:1 degree in psychology, and in 2014 graduated from Cardiff University with a distinction in PCGE psychology. Also in 2014, Snowsill launched her own healthy food company, Onest Food, alongside her rugby career.

Snowsill has always been involved in social and charitable work, previously working as a learning support officer, and since 2017 acting as mentor and coach at The School of Hard Knocks, an organisation that uses sport in secondary schools to tackle unemployment, crime and poor health.

She is also an active LGBTQ+ advocate, and has been outspoken on issues of diversity in rugby.
