= Gabby Senft =

Canada international rugby union player

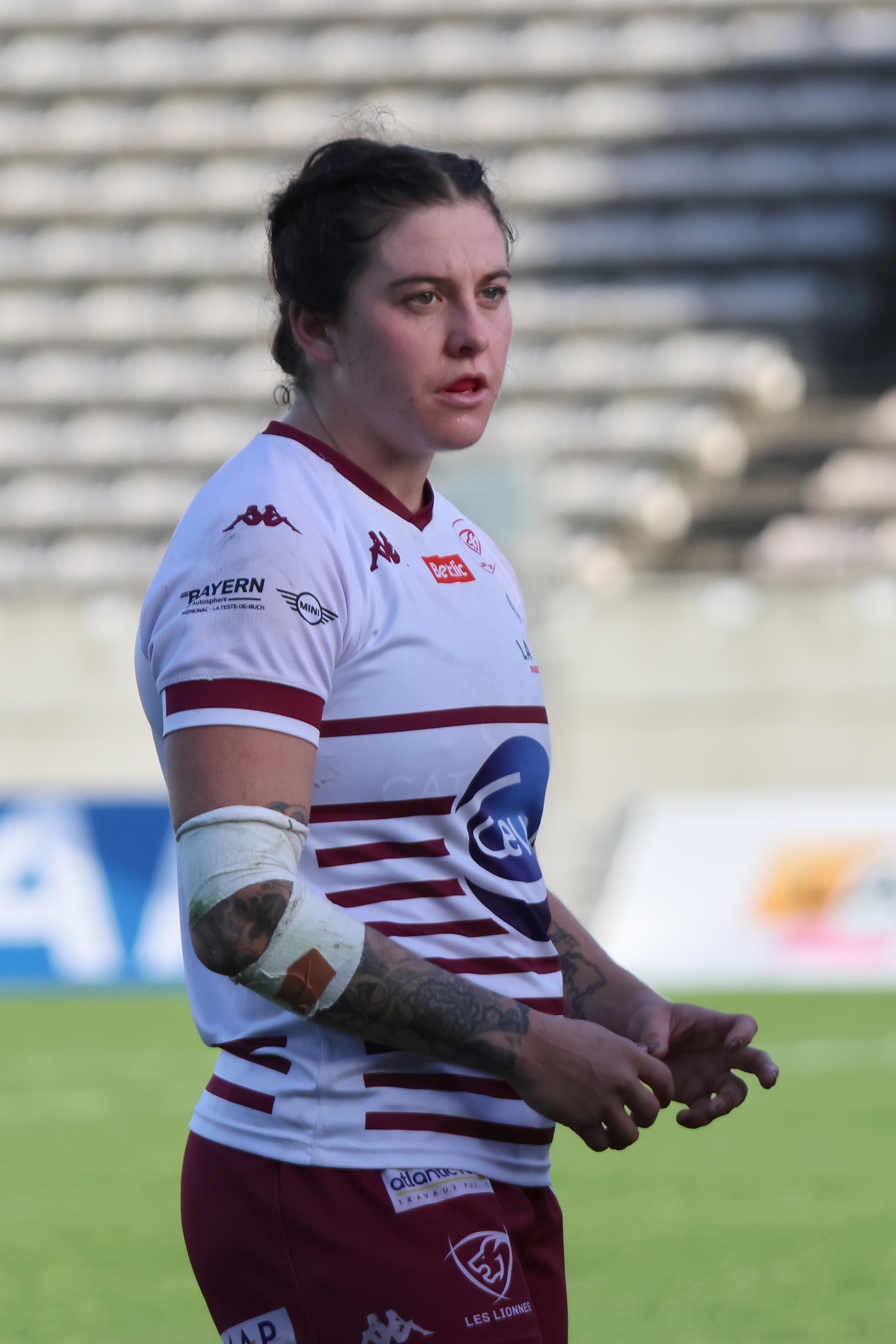
- Born: 13 June 1997 (age 29)
- Height: 5 ft 9 in (175 cm)
- Weight: 80 kg (176 lb)

Rugby union career
- Position: Back Row
- Current team: Saracens
Senior career
Years	Team	Apps	(Points)
	Exeter Chiefs	15	(10)
International career
Years	Team	Apps	(Points)
2018–	Canada	38	(5)
- Correct as of 2025-09-27
Medal record
Women's rugby union
Representing Canada
World Cup
Silver medal – second place	2025 England	Team competition

Gabrielle Le Jewel Senft (born 13 June 1997) is a Canadian rugby union player. She competed for Canada at the delayed 2021 Rugby World Cup.

== Rugby career ==
Senft made her international debut for Canada against England in November 2018. She signed with Exeter Chiefs for the 2021–2022 Premier 15s season. She previously played for Bristol in 2019 and has also spent time with the Queensland Reds in the Super W.

Senft competed for Canada at the delayed 2021 Rugby World Cup in New Zealand. She featured against the Eagles in the quarterfinals, against England in the semifinal, and in the third place final against France.

In July 2023, she started in her sides Pacific Four loss to the Black Ferns, they went down 21–52.

She was selected in Canada's squad for the 2025 Pacific Four Series. In July, she was named in the Canadian side to the Rugby World Cup in England.
