= Laura Sheehan =

- Born: 23 January 1993 (age 33) Cork, Ireland
- Height: 1.63 m (5 ft 4 in)
- Weight: 65 kg (143 lb; 10 st 3 lb)

Rugby union career
- Position: Wing
Amateur team(s)
Years	Team	Apps	(Points)
- Highfield RFC
Senior career
Years	Team	Apps	(Points)
2016	UL Bohemians		
2016	Munster		
2021	Exeter Chiefs		
International career
Years	Team	Apps	(Points)
2018–	Ireland	4	(5)
National sevens team
Years	Team		Comps
	Ireland 7s		0

Laura Sheehan (born 23 January 1993) is an Irish rugby player from Urhan in West Cork. She plays for Exeter Chiefs, Munster and the Ireland women's national rugby union team.

== Club career ==
Sheehan did not take up rugby until she went University College Cork, aged 19. Her first senior club was Highfield RFC. When she went to the University of Limerick to do a Masters she joined All-Ireland League side UL Bohemians in 2016 and has played for the Ireland women's national Rugby Sevens team and the Ireland women's national rugby union team.

In January 2021, in order to get more experience and try to make the Ireland team for the 2021 Women's Rugby World Cup, she joined Exeter Chiefs to play in the top division of English club rugby, the Premier 15s. She made her debut for them in March 2021.

== International career ==
Sheehan got her first Irish XV cap in late 2018, starting on the left wing against USA in the Autumn Internationals and scored a try on her debut.

In the 2019 Women's Six Nations she was a replacement against Italy and Wales.

She impressed in her only appearance in the 2020 Women's Six Nations when she was a late-call up to start against Italy because of player withdrawals due to Coronavirus. She was a member of the Ireland women's national rugby union team for the 2021 Women's Six Nations.

== Personal life ==
Sheehan hails from a rural part of the scenic Beara Peninsula, part of the Wild Atlantic Way. It is a GAA stronghold and, growing up, she took part in athletics but had no real opportunity to play rugby until she got to university.

She graduated from University College Cork with a commerce degree and works for PWC.
