= Ellen Murphy =

- Born: 9 April 1995 (age 31) Longford, Ireland
- Height: 1.65 m (5 ft 5 in)
- Weight: 62 kg (137 lb; 9 st 11 lb)

Rugby union career
- Position(s): Scrum-half, Out-half
Amateur team(s)
Years	Team	Apps	(Points)
- Highfield RFC
Senior career
Years	Team	Apps	(Points)
- Munster
- Old Belvedere
- Leinster
2019	Gloucester-Hartpury		
2020	Blackrock College		
2021	Worcester Warriors		
International career
Years	Team	Apps	(Points)
2018–present	Ireland	7	(3)
National sevens team
Years	Team		Comps
	Ireland 7s		0

Ellen Murphy (born 9 April 1995) is an Irish rugby player from Dromard, County Longford. She plays for Blackrock College and Leinster Rugby and the Ireland women's national rugby union team.

== Club career ==
Murphy did not take up rugby until she was 18, in her second year at University College, Cork. Her first club was Highfield RFC when she also lined out for Munster Rugby. She then joined Old Belvedere RFC and Leinster Rugby. In 2019 she moved to Gloucester-Hartpury to gain experience in the Premier 15s.

Due to Covid restrictions on travel she moved back to Ireland during 2020 and joined Blackrock College. In August 2021 she returned to play semi-professional rugby in England with Worcester Warriors.

== International career ==
Murphy made her debut for the Ireland women's national rugby union team, against England, in an Autumn International in front of 82,000 people in Twickenham in November 2018.

She made her Six Nations debut in the 2019 Women's Six Nations where she was a replacement in all five games.

She got her first start in the opening round of the 2020 Women's Six Nations against Scotland, playing at out-half, but an injury ruled her out of the remaining games.

She was selected to the Irish squad for the 2021 Six Nations.

== Personal life ==
Murphy, whose father is from Kilkenny, grew up in a strong Gaelic Athletic Association household. The former Moyne Community School student won camogie medals with the Lacken club in Cavan and junior and intermediate ladies gaelic football titles with Dromard in Longford.

She has a degree in biomedical science from University College Cork and, since moving to England to play for Worcester in August 2021, works for the Wye Valley NHS.
