= Flo Robinson =

England international rugby union player

- Born: Florence Robinson; 4 October 2001 (age 25) Brighton and Hove, England
- Height: 1.66 m (5 ft 5 in)
- Weight: 64 kg (141 lb)
- Notable relative: Emily Robinson (sister)

Rugby union career
- Position: Scrum half
- Current team: Exeter Chiefs Women
Senior career
Years	Team	Apps	(Points)
2021–2023	Exeter Chiefs		
2023–2024	Harlequins		
2024–	Exeter Chiefs		

Florence Robinson (4 October 2001) is an English rugby union player. Known as Flo, she currently plays scrum half for Exeter Chiefs in the PWR.

== International career ==
Having played for the U20s side, Robinson was called up to the senior England squad in March 2021. She was one of six development players for the side during the 2021 Women's Six Nations Championship but did not get a chance to earn her first cap.

Robinson has also played for the England U18s 7s side, competing in the U18s Rugby Europe competition in 2019.

Robinson was called up to the Red Roses training squad as part of a 38-player three-day training camp as they prepared for the Women's Rugby World Cup.

On 17 March 2025, she was named in England's squad for the Women's Six Nations Championship.

== Club career ==
Robinson plays for Exeter Chiefs as a scrum half. She joined the club from Pulborough RFC.

She was signed on a 1 year deal to play for Harlequins for the 2023/24 season, and returned to Chiefs for 2024 along with her sister Emily.

== Early life and education ==
Her sister, Emily Robinson, plays for Harlequins Women and was also named to the England squad for the 2021 Women's Six Nations.

Robinson graduated from the University of Exeter in 2023.
