= Hope Rogers =

American rugby union player

- Born: January 7, 1993 (age 33)
- Height: 5 ft 6 in (168 cm)
- Weight: 195 lb (88 kg)
- School: Chambersburg Area Senior High School
- University: Pennsylvania State University

Rugby union career
- Position: Prop
Senior career
Years	Team	Apps	(Points)
- Life West
2022–	Exeter Chiefs Women	13	(60)
International career
Years	Team	Apps	(Points)
2013–	United States	59	(125)
National sevens team
Years	Team		Comps
2017–	United States		

Hope Rogers (born January 7, 1993) is an American rugby union player who plays for Exeter Chiefs in the Allianz Premier 15s. She has competed for the Eagles in four consecutive Rugby World Cup's, at the 2014, 2017, 2021 and 2025 tournaments.

== Early career ==
Rogers began playing rugby as a sophomore in 2009 at Chambersburg Area Senior High School. In her first year of rugby she made the Mid-Atlantic All Star-Team that went to the U19 National All-Star Championship tournament. She led them to a championship title the next year as captain. In 2011 she received the Kevin Higgins College Scholarships.

== International career ==
Rogers debuted for the United States against France in June 2013. She was selected for the squad to the 2017 Women's Rugby World Cup in Ireland. She made her rugby sevens debut at the 2017 Sydney Women's Sevens.

Rogers signed for Exeter Chiefs in January 2022. She started the 2021-22 Premier 15s final, finishing as runners up to Saracens Women. Rodgers was named in the 2021-22 Premier 15s team of the year.

Rogers was named in the Eagles squad for the 2022 Pacific Four Series in New Zealand. She was also named in the United States squad for the 2021 Rugby World Cup.

In 2023, She was named in the Eagles traveling squad for their test against Spain, and for the 2023 Pacific Four Series. She scored two tries in her sides hard-fought victory over Spain.

In 2025, she played in a test against Japan in Los Angeles on April 26, the Eagles lost the closely contested game 33–39. It was her 51st appearance which tied her with former US international, Jamie Burke, for the most test caps by a Women's Eagle. On May 17, she scored a hat-trick against Australia in round two of the 2025 Pacific Four Series in her 53rd appearance for the Eagles.

On July 17, she was named in the Eagles squad for the 2025 Women's Rugby World Cup. She scored twice for her side in their final World Cup game against Samoa.
