= Heather Cowell =

English rugby union and sevens player

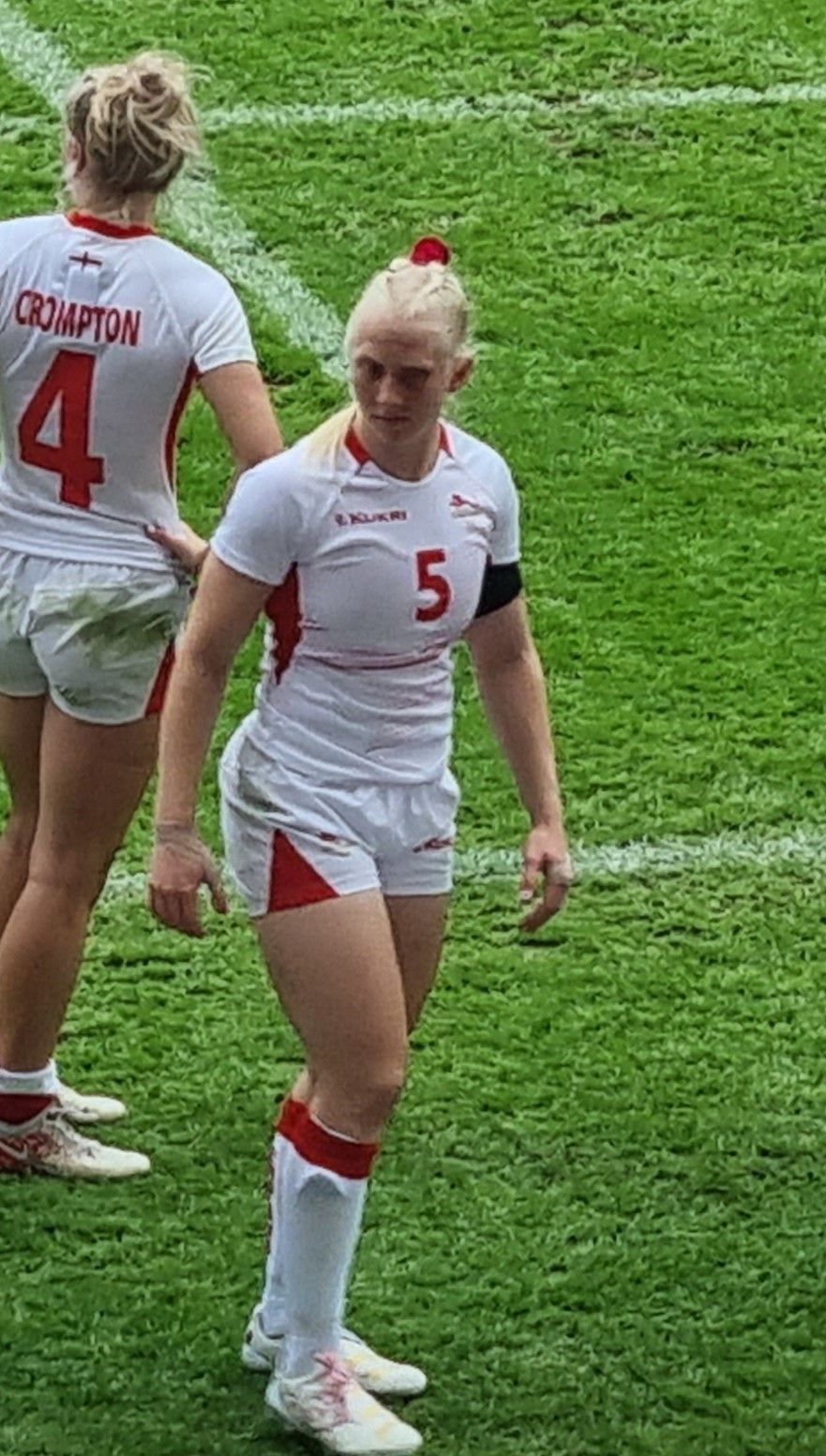
- Cowell at the 2022 Commonwealth Games
- Full name: Heather Rebecca S. Cowell
- Born: 23 January 1996 (age 30) Isleworth
- Height: 1.69 m (5 ft 7 in)
- Weight: 60 kg (132 lb)

Rugby union career
- Position: Winger
Senior career
Years	Team	Apps	(Points)
2017	Worcester Warriors		
2018–	Harlequins		
International career
Years	Team	Apps	(Points)
2022–	England	3	(20)
National sevens teams
Years	Team		Comps
2022–	England 7s		
2023–	Great Britain 7s		
Medal record
Women's rugby sevens
Representing Great Britain
European Games
Gold medal – first place	2023 Kraków–Małopolska	Team competition

Heather Rebecca S. Cowell (born 23 January 1996) is an English rugby union player who plays for the Great Britain women's national rugby sevens team and has also played for England sevens.

== Career ==
A former international gymnast, Cowell was a junior world champion in tumbling in 2013 in Bulgaria, and was part of the winning team at the Senior European Champion Team Event in 2014 in Portugal. Cowell performed gymnastics at the opening ceremony of the 2014 Commonwealth Games in Glasgow. Cowell competed at international level until she was 20. After playing rugby at the University of Birmingham, Cowell joined Worcester Warriors before taking some time out of the game and returning with Harlequins Women.

Cowell scored twice on her England XV’s debut during the 2021-22 season. A call up to the England sevens team followed for the England Rugby Europe Series in Budapest. Cowell was selected to play for England at the 2022 Commonwealth Games in rugby sevens. She was named in the England squad for the 2022 Rugby World Cup Sevens – Women's tournament held in Cape Town, South Africa in September 2022. She was a selected as a member of the GB sevens squad for the 2023 European Games. Great Britain won a gold medal at the event and sealed qualification for the 2024 Olympic Games. In June 2024, she was named in the British squad for the Olympic Games. The team finished seventh.

She was named in the Great Britain women's national rugby sevens team for the 2024-25 SVNS series which began at the Dubai Sevens on 30 November 2024. She continued to play with the GB Sevens team during the 2025-26 SVNS, her performances including a try against Canada at the 2026 Hong Kong Sevens.

== Personal life ==
Cowell attended Chase Bridge Primary School in Twickenham, Orleans Park School and Richmond College. Her brother Cameron Cowell is a professional rugby player who has also represented England at sevens rugby.
