= Sarah Beckett =

England international rugby union player

- Full name: Sarah Elizabeth Beckett
- Born: 14 February 1999 (age 27) Liverpool, England
- Height: 1.78 m (5 ft 10 in)
- Weight: 96 kg (212 lb)
- Notable relative: Charlie Beckett (brother)

Rugby union career
- Position: Back row
- Current team: Gloucester-Hartpury
Amateur team(s)
Years	Team	Apps	(Points)
	Lancashire		(0)
	North of England U18s		(0)
Senior career
Years	Team	Apps	(Points)
2017–2019	Firwood Waterloo		(0)
2019–2022	Harlequins		(0)
2022–	Gloucester-Hartpury		(0)
International career
Years	Team	Apps	(Points)
2018	England U20s		
2018–	England	35	(20)

Sarah Elizabeth Beckett (born 14 February 1999) is a professional English rugby union player. She represents England women's national rugby union team internationally and plays for Gloucester-Hartpury at club level.

== International career ==
Beckett made her England debut in November 2018, starting in an 57–5 victory of USA Women. She featured in every game as England won the 2019 Women's Six Nations Championship Grand Slam.

She played in all Autumn Internationals and 2020 Women's Six Nations matches.

On 17 March 2025, she was named in the Red Roses squad for the Women's Six Nations Championship.

== Club career ==
Beckett made her debut in the Premier 15s for Waterloo Ladies aged 18. The club was renamed Firwood Waterloo Ladies Rugby Football Club for sponsorship reasons. She won the Gill Burns' Ladies Championship with Firwood in the 2016/17 season. In the same season, she also won the Gill Burns' Ladies County Championship as captain of the Lancashire and North of England U18 team.

As the only professional rugby player at Firwood, she moved to Harlequins Women in 2019 in a bid to help her retain professional standards.

== Early life and education ==
Sarah has a twin sister called Kate who didn't play rugby until she attended Leicester University. Their older brother, Charlie, is a former professional rugby union player. Aged 8, Sarah tried to tackle her older brother but broke her arm. Her father, uncle and grandfather all played rugby for Waterloo.

Sarah attended Range High School in Formby, Merseyside, where former England and Waterloo captain Gill Burns was her head of house. She joined Waterloo RFC aged seven. Beckett completed the U20s trials twice for England and didn't make the squad but eventually made it after Matt Ferguson, the then England forwards coach, saw her playing for Firwood at age 18.

After a gap year spent teaching PE at primary schools, she went on to study international disaster management at university but left after ten weeks as her rugby training for England interfered with her studies. She also plays guitar.
