= 2019 Women's Six Nations Championship =

Women's rugby union competition

- Date: 1 February – 17 March 2019
- Countries: England; France; Ireland; Italy; Scotland; Wales

Tournament statistics
- Champions: England (15th title)
- Grand Slam: England (14th title)
- Triple Crown: England (20th title)
- Matches played: 15
- Tries scored: 114 (7.6 per match)
- Top point scorer(s): (England) Katy Daley-McLean (58)
- Top try scorer(s): (England) Jess Breach (9)
- Player of the tournament: (England) Sarah Bern
- Official website: Official website

The 2019 Women's Six Nations Championship was the 18th series of the Women's Six Nations Championship, an annual women's rugby union competition featuring six European rugby union national teams. Matches were held in February and March 2019, on the same weekends as the men's tournament, if not always the same day.

== Table ==
| Position | Nation | Matches | | | | Points | | | Tries | | Bonus points | | | Table points |
| Position | Nation | Played | Won | Drawn | Lost | For | Against | Diff | For | Against | T BP | L BP | GS BP | Table points |
|---|---|---|---|---|---|---|---|---|---|---|---|---|---|---|
| 1 | England | 5 | 5 | 0 | 0 | 278 | 45 | +233 | 45 | 7 | 5 | 0 | 3 | 28 |
| 2 | Italy | 5 | 3 | 1 | 1 | 91 | 104 | –13 | 12 | 16 | 3 | 0 | 0 | 17 |
| 3 | France | 5 | 3 | 0 | 2 | 178 | 102 | +76 | 29 | 16 | 4 | 0 | 0 | 16 |
| 4 | Wales | 5 | 2 | 1 | 2 | 59 | 126 | −67 | 8 | 22 | 1 | 0 | 0 | 11 |
| 5 | Ireland | 5 | 1 | 0 | 4 | 78 | 156 | −78 | 13 | 24 | 2 | 1 | 0 | 7 |
| 6 | Scotland | 5 | 0 | 0 | 5 | 37 | 188 | −151 | 7 | 29 | 0 | 1 | 0 | 1 |

== Fixtures ==
=== Week 1 ===
| Test: 1303 | 1 February 2019 | Ireland | 7–51 | England (1 BP) | Donnybrook Stadium, Dublin |
| | 17:00 GMT (UTC±00:00) | Try: Penalty try 61' | Report | Try: Breach 5' m McKenna 29' m Bern 41' c Davies 46' c Daley-McLean 53' c Harrison 66' m E. Scott 76' m B. Cleall 80' c Con: Daley-McLean (4) 42', 47', 54', 80'; Pen: Daley-McLean 23' | Referee: Aimee Barrett-Theron (South Africa) |

| Test: 1304 | 1 February 2019 | Scotland | 7–28 | Italy (1 BP) | Scotstoun Stadium, Glasgow |
| | 19:00 GMT (UTC±00:00) | Try: Bonar 40' c Con: Skeldon 40' | Report | Try: Arrighetti 5' c Franco 53' c Rigoni 73' c Giordano 80' c Con: Sillari (4) 7', 54', 75', 80' | Referee: Nikki O'Donnell (England) |

| Test: 1305 | 2 February 2019 | (1 BP) France | 52–3 | Wales | Altrad Stadium, Montpellier |
| | 21:00 CET (UTC+01:00) | Try: Thomas (3) 5' m, 33' m, 58' m N'Diaye 19' m Murie (2) 35' m, 80' m R. Ménager (2) 42' m, 51' c Constanty 63' c Con: Imart (2) 53', 65'; Pen: Imart 11' | Report | Pen: Wilkins 15' | Referee: Sean Gallagher (Ireland) |

=== Week 2 ===
| Test: 1306 | 8 February 2019 | Scotland | 5–22 | Ireland (1 BP) | Scotstoun Stadium, Glasgow |
| | 19:35 GMT (UTC±00:00) | Try: Smith 6' m | | Try: McDermott 20' m Lyons 40 m' Miller 45' m Caplice 58' c Con: Fowley 59' | Referee: Beatrice Benvenuti (Italy) |

| Test: 1307 | 9 February 2019 | Italy | 3–3 | Wales | Stadio Via del mare, Lecce |
| | 20:00 CET (UTC+01:00) | Pen: Sillari 61' | | Pen: Wilkins 31' | Referee: Aimee Barrett-Theron (South Africa) |

| Test: 1308 | 10 February 2019 | (1 BP) England | 41–26 | France (1 BP) | Castle Park, Doncaster |
| | 12:45 GMT (UTC±00:00) | Try: Breach (2) 11' c, 40' +1 m P. Cleall (2) 26' m, 45' m Smith 35' c Botterman 58' c O'Donnell 65' m Con: Daley-McLean (3) 12', 37', 58' | | Try: N'Diaye 42' c Bourdon (2) 47' m, 75' c R. Ménager 80' +1 c Con: Bourdon (2) 43', 75'; Imart 80' +2 | Referee: Tim Baker (Hong Kong) |

=== Week 3 ===
| Test: 1310 | 23 February 2019 | (1 BP) Italy | 29–27 | Ireland (2 BP) | Stadio Sergio Lanfranchi, Parma |
| | 19:30 CET (UTC+01:00) | Try: Muzzo 6' c Giacomoli 14' c Stefan 38' m Franco 50' c Con: Sillari (3) 7', 15', 51'; Pen: Sillari 2' | | Try: Considine (2) 11' m, 17' c Caplice 35' c Sheehan 64' m Con: Fowley (2) 18', 36'; Pen: Fowley 30' | Referee: Laura Pettingale (England) |

| Test: 1311 | 23 February 2019 | (1 BP) France | 41–10 | Scotland | Stadium Lille Métropole, Villeneuve-d'Ascq |
| | 21:00 CET (UTC+01:00) | Try: Vernier (3) 8' m, 33' c, 52' c Bourdon 15' m Constanty 39' c Boujard 56' m Jason 74' m Con: Bourdon (3) 34', 40', 53' | | Try: Lloyd 27' m Wassell 67' m | Referee: Sara Cox (England) |

| Test: 1312 | 24 February 2019 | Wales | 12–51 | England (1 BP) | Cardiff Arms Park, Cardiff |
| | 12:30 GMT (UTC±00:00) | Try: Kavanagh-Williams 34' m Hale 76' c Con: Wilkins 77' | | Try: Bern (2) 2' c, 26' c Breach (2) 5' m, 30' m Packer 15' m O'Donnell 60' m Dow 63' m Beckett 68' c Daley-McLean 80' +1 m Con: Harrison (3) 2', 27', 69' | Referee: Clara Munarini (Italy) |

=== Week 4 ===
| Test: 1313 | 8 March 2019 | (1 BP) Scotland | 15–17 | Wales | Scotstoun Stadium, Glasgow |
| | 19:35 GMT (UTC±00:00) | Try: Konkel 7' m Bonar 18' m Rollie 73' m | | Try: B. Lewis 16' c Lillicrap 79' c Con: Wilkins 16'; George 80' +1; Pen: Wilkins 12' | Referee: Rebecca Mahoney (New Zealand) |

| Test: 1315 | 9 March 2019 | (1 BP) England | 55–0 | Italy | Sandy Park, Exeter |
| | 12:05 GMT (UTC±00:00) | Try: Breach (2) 12' c, 62' m Davies 32' c Hunter 39' c Bern 41' m Packer 46' c Cornborough 58' m A. Scott 73' m Fleetwood 80' +2 c Con: Harrison 13'; Daley-McLean (4) 33', 39', 47', 80' +3 | | | Referee: Aurélie Groizeleau (France) |

| Test: 1316 | 9 March 2019 | Ireland | 17–47 | France (1 BP) | Donnybrook Stadium, Dublin |
| | 19:00 GMT (UTC±00:00) | Try: Griffin 9' m Molloy 19' c Naoupu 62' m Con: Fowley 19' | | Try: Thomas 3' c Jason 13' c Arricastre 32' c Boujard 37' c R. Ménager 45' c Forlani 70' c M. Ménager 75' m Con: Trémoulière (6) 4', 14', 34', 38', 46', 72' | Referee: Ian Tempest (England) |

=== Week 5 ===
| Test: 1318 | 16 March 2019 | (1 BP) England | 80–0 | Scotland | Twickenham Stadium, London |
| | 19:30 GMT (UTC±00:00) | Try: Beckett 2' c Breach (2) 5' c, 16' m Hunt 11' c Smith 21' c P. Cleall (2) 24' c, 70' c Cokayne 39' m Bern 49' c Hunter 52' c Scarratt 64' c O'Donnell 79' c Con: Daley-McLean (9) 3', 6', 12', 21', 26', 50', 53', 65', 71'; Scarratt 80' | | | Referee: Joy Neville (Ireland) |

| Test: 1319 | 17 March 2019 | (1 BP) Wales | 24–5 | Ireland | Cardiff Arms Park, Cardiff |
| | 13:30 GMT (UTC±00:00) | Try: Kavanagh-Williams 17' m Phillips 36' c B. Lewis 68' c Joyce 76' m Con: George (2) 37', 69' | | Try: Parsons 13' m | Referee: Hollie Davidson (Scotland) |

| Test: 1320 | 17 March 2019 | (1 BP) Italy | 31–12 | France | Stadio Plebiscito, Padua |
| | 14:30 CET (UTC+01:00) | Try: Stefan 20' m Bettoni 54' c Rigoni 70' m Furlan 76' m Con: Sillari 56'; Pen: Sillari (3) 40', 45', 63' | | Try: Boujard 36' m Jason 66' c Con: Trémoulière 67' | Referee: Rebecca Mahoney (New Zealand) |
