= Anna Caplice =

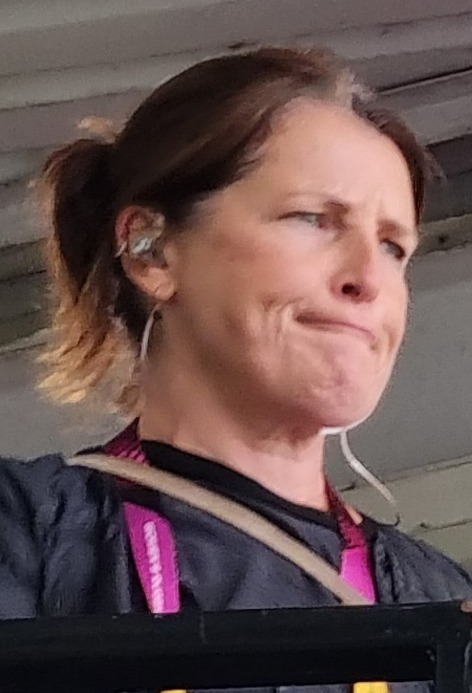
- Caplice at the 2025 Women’s Rugby World Cup
- Born: 13 September 1989 (age 37) Cork, Ireland
- Height: 1.68 m (5 ft 6 in)
- Weight: 76 kg (168 lb; 12 st 0 lb)

Rugby union career
- Position: Flanker
Amateur team(s)
| Years | Team | Apps | (Points) |
| 2007-2008 | Mallow | | |
Senior career
| Years | Team | Apps | (Points) |
| 2009 | UL Bohemians | | |
| 2015-2018 | Richmond Women | | |
| 2019-2021 | Harlequins | | |
| 2022 | Gloucester-Hartpury | | |
| 2023- | Stade Rochelais Women | | |
International career
| Years | Team | Apps | (Points) |
| 2016–2021 | Ireland | 14 | (10) |
National sevens team
| Years | Team | | Comps |
- Ireland 7s

Anna Caplice (born 13 September 1989) is an Irish rugby player from Mallow, Co Cork. She plays in the back row for English club Harlequins, Munster Rugby and the Ireland women's national rugby union team. She is a qualified language teacher and rugby coach.

== Club career ==
Caplice (pronounced Cape-less) had her first game of rugby when she was 17 with Mallow Rugby Club. She was soon selected for Munster underage development squads and has played for them at every level.

Her first senior club with Limerick side UL Bohemians. When she moved to London to study she joined Richmond RFC and spent four years with them before transferring to Harlequins ahead of the 2019/20 Premier 15s season. Caplice, who joined English side Gloucester-Hartpury in 2022 playing one season.

After a short time out of the club game she returned for the 2023/24 season signing for Stade Rochelais Women as player/coach.

== International career ==
Caplice's first international experience was with the Ireland women's national rugby sevens team. She first played for them in the 2013-2014 World Sevens Series in Dubai.

She made her debut for the Ireland women's national rugby union team, against Canada, in the 2016 Autumn Internationals.

She was selected for Ireland for the 2017 Women's Rugby World Cup squad.

She made her Six Nations debut, against France, in the 2018 Women's Six Nations where she also started against Italy and was a replacement against France.

In the 2019 Women's Six Nations she started against Scotland and Italy and was a replacement against England, France and Wales.

In the 2020 Women's Six Nations she was Ireland's starting Number Eight against Scotland, Wales and England but did not play in the rescheduled game versus Italy in October. She was selected in the Ireland squad for the 2021 Women's Six Nations but did not play.

== Personal life ==
Caplice has a languages degree from the University of Limerick and a post-grad in modern languages from St Mary's College, Twickenham. She is a qualified teacher and rugby coach. She has travelled extensively and lived in Argentina, Vienna and Japan.

She works part-time, as a development officer, for Harlequins RFC. She plays several musical instruments, including the ukulele, and is a keen angler.

She is an ambassador for Rugby Players Ireland 'Tackle Your Feelings' campaign. In 2020 she spoke out about the trolling of female rugby players on social media.

== Honours ==
- A member of the 2019 Barbarians team
