= Chloe Benjamin =

American author

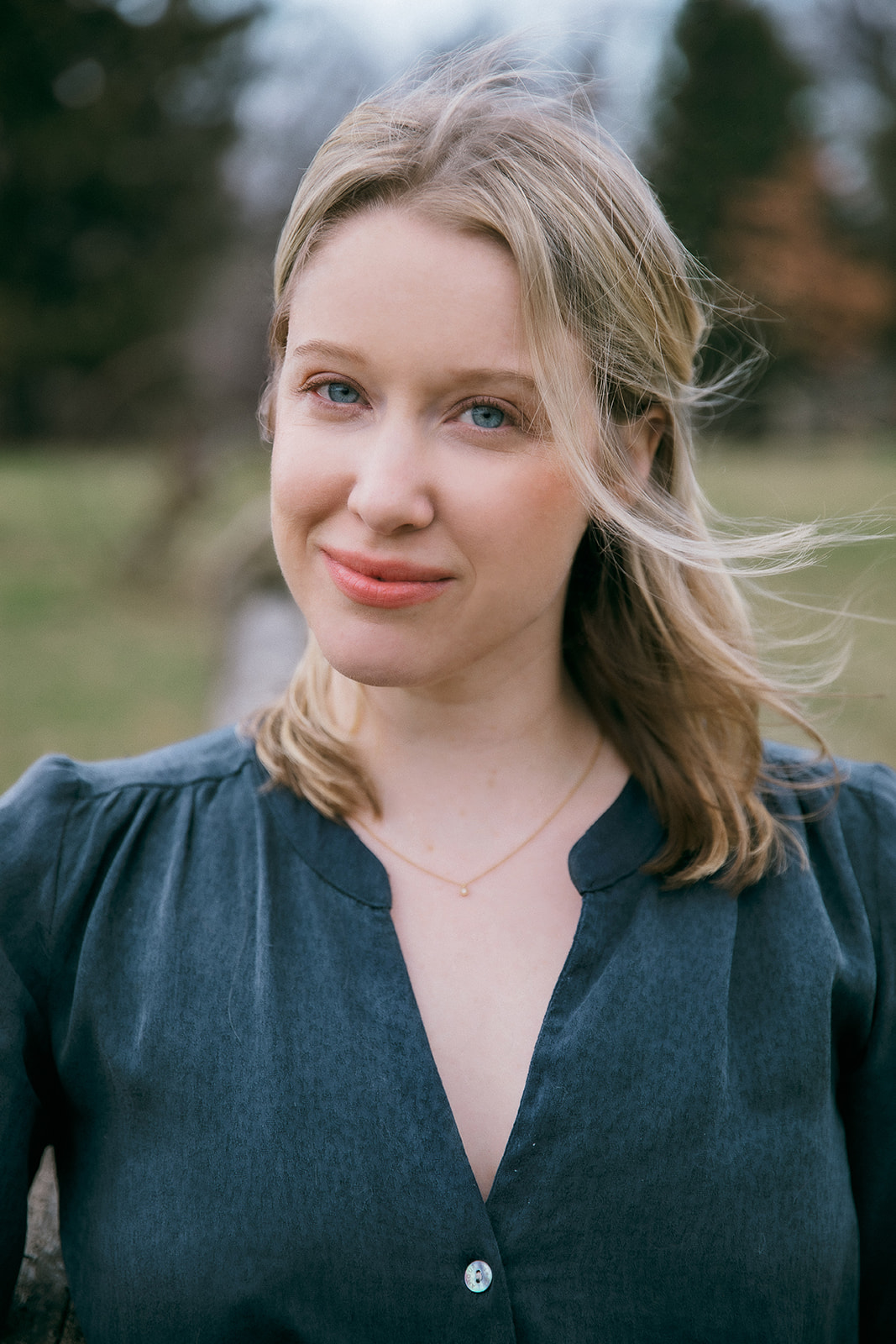
- Author photo of Chloe Benjamin
- Born: 1989 (age 36–37); San Francisco, California
- Education: Vassar College; University of Wisconsin–Madison
- Occupation: Writer
- Writing career
- Notable work: The Immortalists (2018)
- Website: www.chloebenjaminbooks.com

Chloe Benjamin is an American author. She has written three novels: Under Story (2026), The Immortalists (2018), and The Anatomy of Dreams (2014). The Immortalists was a New York Times bestseller.

Benjamin is from San Francisco, California. She received her undergraduate degree from Vassar College and her Master of Fine Arts from the University of Wisconsin–Madison.

== Bibliography ==
- —— (2014). The Anatomy of Dreams. Atria Books.
- —— (2018). The Immortalists. G.P. Putnam's Sons.
- —— (2026). Under Story. G.P. Putnam's Sons.
