= Susie Appleby =

England international rugby union player

- Born: 21 December 1970 (age 55)
- Height: 1.67 m (5 ft 6 in)
- Weight: 60 kg (132 lb)

Rugby union career
- Position(s): Scrumhalf, Flyhalf
Amateur team(s)
Years	Team	Apps	(Points)
- Saracens Women
International career
Years	Team	Apps	(Points)
1994–2005	England	64	(70)
Coaching career
- Years: Team
- 2014–2019: Gloucester-Hartpury
- 2019–2025: Exeter Chiefs Women
Medal record
Representing England
Women's rugby union
Rugby World Cup
Silver medal – second place	2002 Spain	Team competition
Bronze medal – third place	1998 Netherlands	Team competition

Susan Kathryn Appleby (born 21 December 1970) is a former English female rugby union player. She represented England at the 1998 and 2002 Women's Rugby World Cup. She was an assistant coach for the England Women's sevens.

She was a police officer, and was, most recently, Head Coach of Exeter Chief's Women, a role from which she departed in 2025 after her contract was not renewed.

She was a runner-up on SAS: Are You Tough Enough?
