= Ellie Boatman =

English rugby union and sevens player

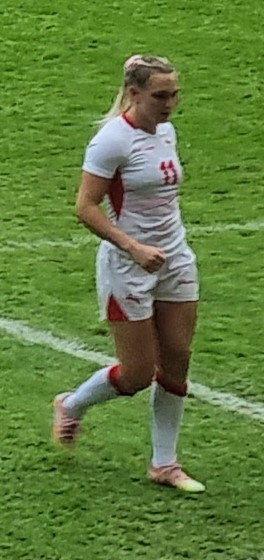
- Boatman at the 2022 Commonwealth Games
- Born: 13 May 1997 (age 29) Frimley, England

Rugby union career
Senior career
Years	Team	Apps	(Points)
2017–2018	Trojans Ladies	2	(5)
2018–2019	Saracens Ladies II	12	(42)
2019–2020	Richmond Women	10	(20)
2020–2022	Wasps Women	22	(130)
2022–2023	Harlequins Women	1	(0)
2023–2026	Ealing Trailfinders Women	4	(20)
International career
Years	Team	Apps	(Points)
2022–	England		
2023–	Great Britain		
Medal record
Women's rugby sevens
Representing Great Britain
European Games
Gold medal – first place	2023 Kraków–Małopolska	Team competition

Eleanor May Boatman (born 13 May 1997) is an English rugby union player who plays for Ealing Trailfinders in Premiership Women's Rugby and the Great Britain women's national rugby sevens team, having also played for England sevens.

== Club career ==
Boatman started playing rugby aged four in Camberley. From the age of 11 she played junior rugby for London Irish, and after a brief hiatus from the sport, began playing again at the University of Southampton and for a local Hampshire side Trojans RFC. Boatman joined Wasps in 2020 following spells with Saracens and Richmond. International recognition with the England sevens followed and she was England’s highest try scorer in the Malaga and Seville sevens with nine tries. Boatman featured for Harlequins Women in the 2022-23 Premier 15s season.

Boatman left Harlequins to join Ealing Trailfinders Women prior to the 2023-24 Premiership Women's Rugby season. Boatman signed a new contract with Ealing Trailfinders in June 2025. Boatman left the club following the conclusion of the 2025–26 Premiership Women's Rugby season.

== International career ==
Boatman was selected to play for England at the 2022 Commonwealth Games in rugby sevens. She was named in the England squad for the 2022 Rugby World Cup Sevens – Women's tournament held in Cape Town, South Africa in September 2022. She was selected to be member of the GB sevens squad for the 2023 European Games. Great Britain won a gold medal at the event and sealed qualification for the 2024 Olympic Games. In June 2024, she was named in the British sevens squad for the Olympic Games in Paris. The team finished seventh.

She was named in the Great Britain women's national rugby sevens team for the 2024-25 SVNS series which began at the Dubai Sevens on 30 November 2024. She returned to the Great Britain Sevens team ahead of the 2026 Hong Kong Sevens.
