= Merryn Doidge =

England international rugby union player

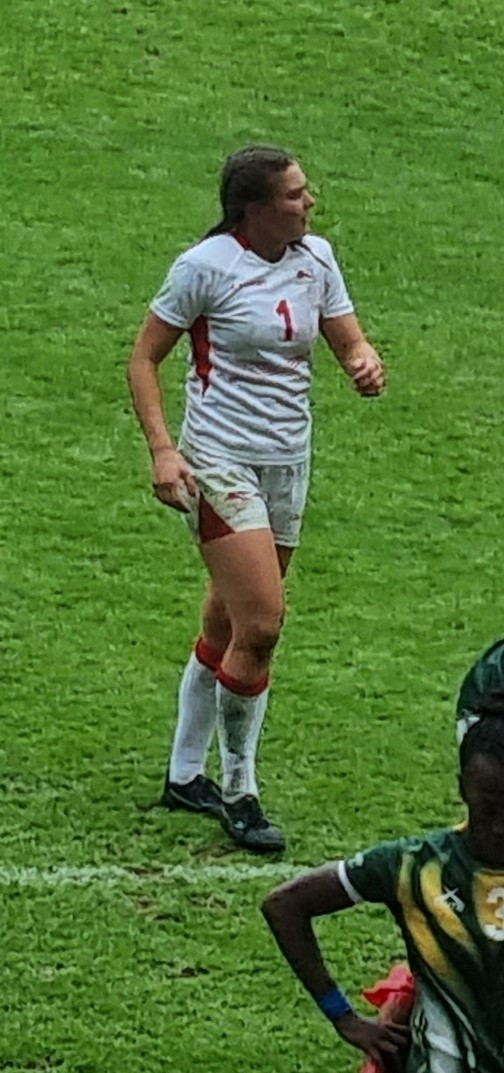
- Merryn Doidge at the 2022 Commonwealth Games
- Born: 2 December 2000 (age 25) Cornwall, England
- Height: 1.71 m (5 ft 7 1/2 in)
- Weight: 68 kg (150 lb; 10 st 10 lb)

Rugby union career
- Position: Full-Back/Wing
Senior career
Years	Team	Apps	(Points)
2020	Exeter Chiefs	109	(145)
International career
Years	Team	Apps	(Points)
2021-present	England	0	(0)

Merryn Elworthy (née Doidge) (born 2 December 2000, Cornwall) is an English rugby union player. She plays for Exeter Chiefs at club level and was an invitational player for the England squad at the 2021 Women's Six Nations.

== International career ==
Doidge played for England U20s and the National Academy side against the US and Canada. She was selected as an Invitational player for the 2021 Women's Six Nations Championships. She was called up to the bench for England's game versus France in April 2021.

In 2022, Merryn represented Team England Rugby 7's at the Commonwealth Games in Birmingham.

== Club career ==
She played for Bristol Bears in 2019 before joining the Exeter Chiefs in 2020.

Doidge has helped Exeter Chiefs to be the Allianz Cup Winners in 2022 & 2023.

For the 2023-2024 season, Merryn is Vice Captain for the Women's Chiefs side alongside fellow University of Exeter colleague, captain Poppy Leitch. During her away game to Harlequins, Merryn scored a hat trick, leading to her 100th point scored for the side.

== Early life and education ==
Born in Cornwall, Doidge started playing rugby at Liskeard-Looe alongside her brother. She moved to Newquay Queen Bees U15s at the age of 12.

She attended Exeter College where she captained the college's side in her second year. She was selected for Cornwall and England U18s the same year.

She studied Exercise and Sport Sciences at the University of Exeter where she gained a First-Class Honours. Merryn is now the Sports Scholarships and Recruitment Officer for University of Exeter Sport.
