= Jennine Detiveaux =

- Born: October 12, 1993 (age 33)
- Height: 5 ft 8 in (173 cm)
- Weight: 160 lb (73 kg)

Rugby union career
- Position: Wing
Senior career
| Years | Team | Apps | (Points) |
| 2020–present | Exeter Chiefs | 23 | (70) |
International career
| Years | Team | Apps | (Points) |
| 2018–present | United States | 11 | (0) |

Jennine Detiveaux (née Duncan, born November 12, 1993) is an American rugby union player. She is a Winger for the United States and for Exeter Chiefs in the Premier 15s.

== Rugby career ==
Detiveaux played college softball at East Tennessee State, she discovered rugby after moving to Seattle and playing for the Seattle Saracens.

Detiveaux made her international debut for the Eagles against England in November 2018. In July 2022, She was one of four Eagles who extended their contracts with Exeter Chiefs for a third season.

Detiveaux played in a warm-up match against Scotland ahead of the World Cup, the Eagles won the hard-fought match 21–17.

Detiveaux was selected in the Eagles squad for the 2021 Rugby World Cup in New Zealand. She was named in the starting line-up against Italy in their opening match. She scored a try against Japan to help the Eagles win their first match at the tournament.
