= Linde van der Velden =

- Born: 20 February 1995 (age 31) Heemskerk
- Height: 184 cm (6 ft 0 in)
- Weight: 92 kg (203 lb; 14 st 7 lb)

Rugby union career
- Position(s): Back Row, Lock
Senior career
Years	Team	Apps	(Points)
2012–2018	Castricumse		
2018–2020	Stade Toulousain		
2020–	Exeter Chiefs	77	(75)
- Correct as of 14 July 2025
International career
Years	Team	Apps	(Points)
2016–	Netherlands	22	
- Correct as of 15 July 2025
National sevens team
Years	Team		Comps
2016–	Netherlands		

Linde Corine van der Velden (born 20 February 1995) is a Dutch rugby union player. She plays for the Netherlands at an international level and for Exeter Chiefs in the Premiership Women's Rugby competition.

== Personal life ==
Van der Velden started playing rugby at 17. She works as an assistant architect for Bailey Partnership, a construction consultancy firm. She also helps the Chiefs marketing team. Her sister and former team-mate, Inge van der Velden, died from cancer aged 30 in January 2023.

== Rugby career ==
=== Professional ===
Van der Velden played for Castricumbe in the Netherlands and for Toulouse in France before joining Exeter Chiefs. She captained the side in their debut Premier 15s season, and scored the club's first-ever Allianz Premier 15s try against Gloucester-Hartpury in the opening round of the 2020–21 season. She helped the Chiefs to two Premier 15s finals and winning the Allianz Cup twice.

She played her 50th game for the club in the 2023–24 season. She signed a new contract with Exeter Chiefs in July.

=== International ===
Van der Velden has represented Netherlands in both fifteens and sevens. In 2016, she made her international debuts just four years after starting to play rugby. She scored her first World Series try for the Netherlands at the Langford 7s in 2017 and was also named Dutch Player of the Year for 2019.

Van der Velden is currently captain of the Netherlands fifteens side and recently helped the Netherlands qualify for the 2024 WXV 3 tournament in Dubai.
