= Patricia García (rugby union) =

Spanish rugby union player (born 1989)

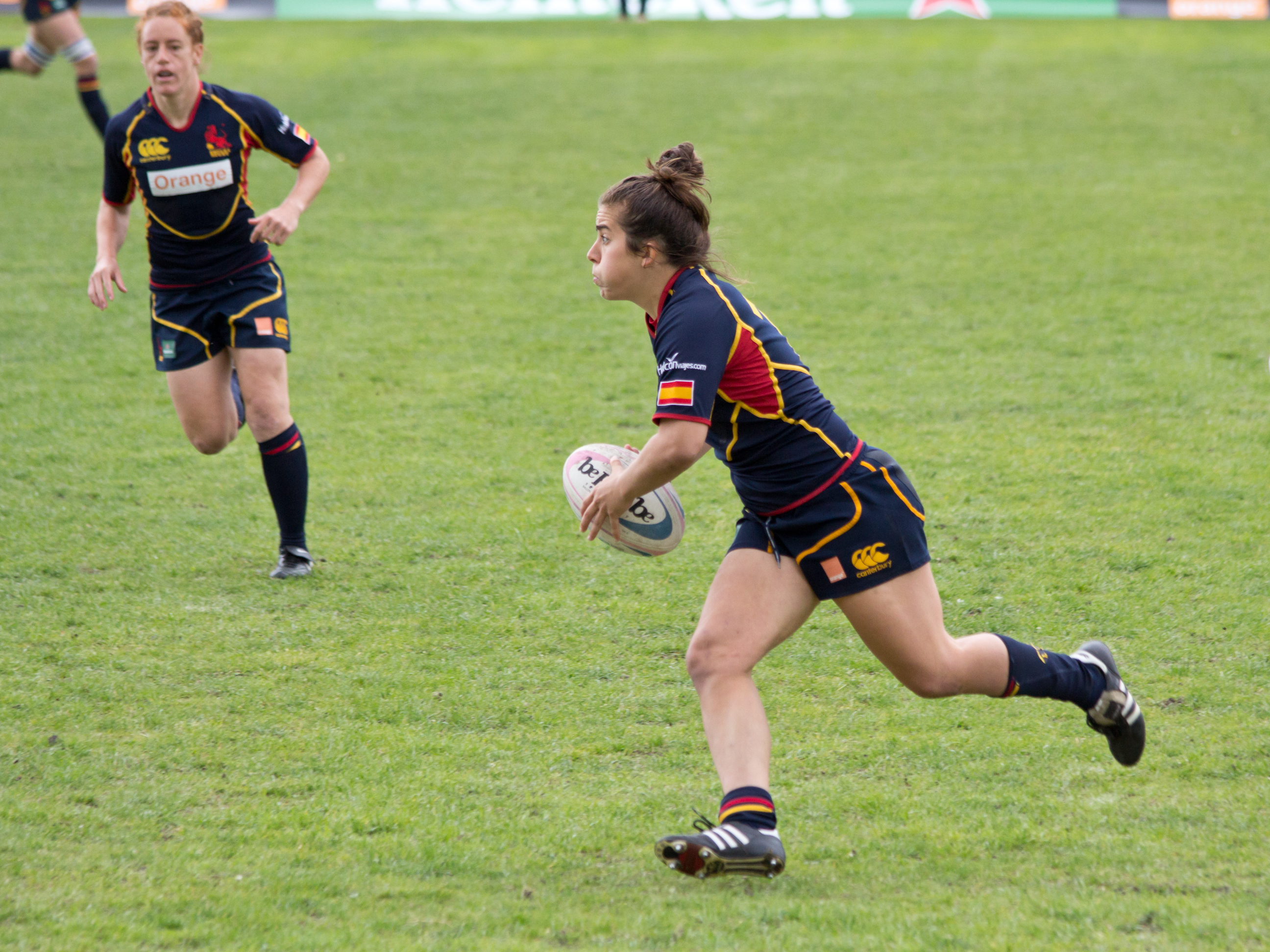
- García in 2013
- Born: 2 December 1989 (age 36) San Lorenzo de El Escorial, Spain
- Height: 1.61 m (5 ft 3 in)
- Weight: 64 kg (141 lb)

Rugby union career
Senior career
Years	Team	Apps	(Points)
????–2020	Olímpico Pozuelo		
2020–2022	Exeter Chiefs Women		
International career
Years	Team	Apps	(Points)
–2022	Spain	24	
National sevens team
Years	Team		Comps
- Spain 7s

Patricia García Rodriguez (born 2 December 1989) is a Spanish rugby union player. She competed for the Spanish women's national rugby sevens team at the 2016 Summer Olympics. She has played in 89 matches in the Women's Sevens Series and amassed over 300 points.

García was in the squad that played for the last qualifying spot for the 2016 Olympics. She was also named in Spain's squad for the 2013 Rugby World Cup Sevens in Russia. She played provincially at the top flight of Spanish rugby for Olimpico Pozuelo, before moving to the newly established Exeter Chiefs Women, in the English top flight league, the Premier 15s.
