= Amber Reed =

England international rugby union player (born 1991)

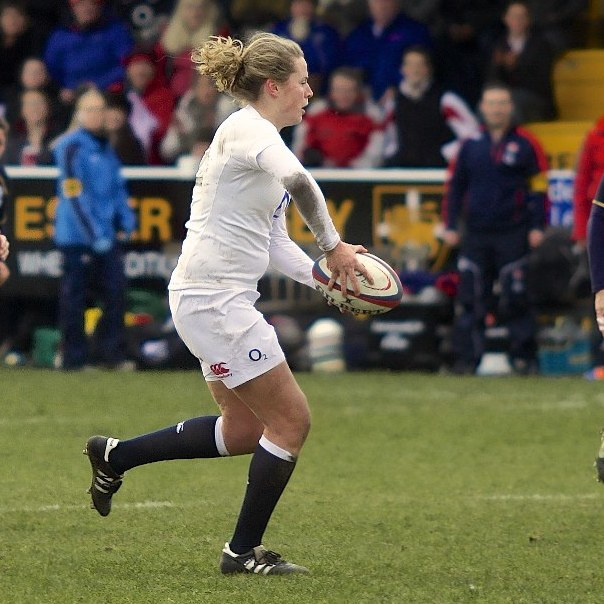
- Born: 3 April 1991 (age 35) Bristol, England
- Height: 1.77 m (5 ft 10 in)
- Weight: 85 kg (187 lb)
- Notable relative: Andy Reed (uncle)

Rugby union career
- Position(s): Fly-half, Centre
Senior career
Years	Team	Apps	(Points)
2013-2025	Bristol Ladies		
International career
Years	Team	Apps	(Points)
2012–2025	England	67	(142)
Medal record
Representing England
Women's rugby union
Rugby World Cup
Gold medal – first place	2014 France	Team competition
Silver medal – second place	2017 Ireland	Team competition

Amber Victoria Reed (born 3 April 1991) is an English former rugby union player. She won the 2014 Women's Rugby World Cup as a member of England's squad and was selected for the 2017 Women's Rugby World Cup squad. Domestically, she played for Bristol Bears. Reed announced her retirement in March 2025.

== International career ==
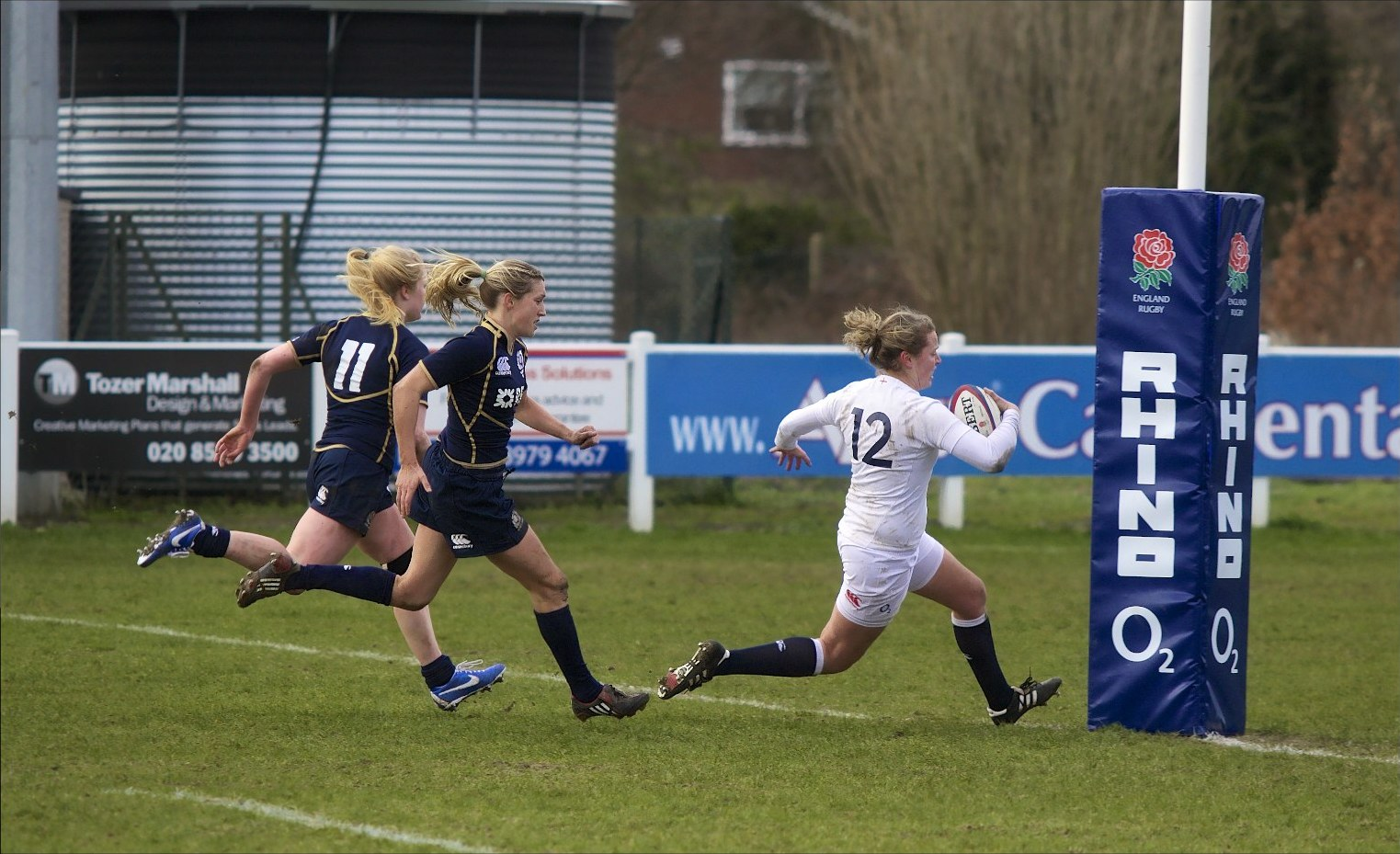
Scoring: England v Scotland (RBS 6 Nations) in 2013

Reed debuted for the England Women's rugby team in 2012 against France, having previously played for the national side's Under 20s team.

In 2014, she won the Women's Rugby World Cup with England. Reed went on to play every match in the 2017 Six Nations, in which England won the Grand Slam. She was also selected for the England World Cup team in 2017; the side lost in the final to New Zealand.

She had a recurring back injury that kept her off the pitch for several months in 2018 and resulted in a specialist advising her to retire from contact sports. However, after her recovery and rehabilitation, Reed's international career continued at the 2018 Women's Six Nations. In 2019, Reed won her 50th cap playing in the Super Series in the USA and received the award from her mother. The same year, she was offered a full-time contract by the RFU, having previously juggled her rugby career with a teaching career. She also played in the first England Women versus the Barbarians match at Twickenham in 2019, which England won.

She again played for England in the curtailed 2020 Women's Six Nations.

== Club career ==
Reed began playing rugby at 14 when she attended Colston's School. While competing in the Rosslyn Park National Schools 7s, she was selected for the England pathway development track.

She played briefly for Thornbury RFC before joining the Bristol Bears women's team in 2009. Reed announced her retirement from professional rugby in March 2025.

== Activism ==
In 2021, Reed became an active member of the #icare social media campaign started by Bristol Bears teammate Stef Evans after Twitter users expressed derision and posted abusive tweets about the news that the 2021 Women's World Cup had been rescheduled.

She has spoken publicly about mental health in sports and is a spokesperson for 'Looseheadz’, a rugby clothing brand raising awareness for mental health.

== Early life ==
Reed is the niece of former Scottish International Andy Reed.

As a youth, she played cricket for Gloucestershire and hockey for Bristol. She attended Colston's School and went on to attain a degree in Exercise and Sports Science from the University of Exeter. She was named British University Colleges Sports Person of the Year in 2013.

Reed is a qualified PE teacher and has taught at Colston's School and Bloxham School.
