= Florence Williams (rugby union) =

English rugby union player

- Born: 27 October 1994 (age 32) Chatham, Kent, England
- Height: 165 cm (5 ft 5 in)
- School: Maidstone Grammar
- Occupation(s): International Rugby Player, Marketing Consultant

Rugby union career
- Position: Fly-half
- Current team: Wasps Ladies
Senior career
Years	Team	Apps	(Points)
–	Loughborough Lightning	--	(--)
–	Lichfield	--	(--)
International career
Years	Team	Apps	(Points)
2021–present	Wales		

Florence Williams, known as 'Flo', (born 27 October 1994) is a Wales rugby union player. She plays fly-half for Wales and for Wasps Ladies Rugby Club. She made her international debut at the 2021 Women's Six Nations Championship.

== Club career ==
Williams began her rugby career with Aylesford Bulls as fly-half and scrum-half. She later went on to play centre and fly-half for Lichfield, and later Loughborough Lightning, before joining the Wasps in 2018.

== International career ==
Williams made her international debut at the 2021 Women's Six Nations Championships, playing fly-half for Wales.

== Personal life ==
Williams was born in Chatham, Kent, in 1994 to an English mother and Welsh father. At age eight, she joined the Aylesford Bulls where she played for 12 years.

She attended Maidstone Grammar School and later Loughborough University, where she graduated in 2017 with a 2.1 degree in graphic communications.

In 2019, Williams launched the Perception Agency which aims to build the profile of women's sport through marketing, consultancy, partnerships and branding.

In August 2020, Williams took to Twitter to highlight the disparity between the marketing material for Ireland Rugby's men's and women's sports kit. While the press shots for the men's kit featured players from the team, the images depicting the women's kit featured nameless models. Williams' tweet went viral, prompting a massive online movement among female rugby players under the hashtag #IAmEnough.

In January 2021, Williams appeared on the podcast Performance Hackers, discussing the perception of women's sport and advocating for positive change.
