= Robyn Lock =

- Born: 22 February 1993 (age 33) Swindon, England
- Height: 1.65 m (5.4 ft)
- Weight: 78.18 kg (12.311 st)
- University: Swansea University
- Occupation(s): Sales manager, rugby player

Rugby union career
- Position: Hooker
- Current team: Gloucester-Hartpury
Senior career
Years	Team	Apps	(Points)
2020–present	Gloucester-Hartpury		
–	Ospreys		
–	Swansea RFC		
International career
Years	Team	Apps	(Points)
2019–present	Wales	6	
- Correct as of 25 may 2021

Robyn Lock (born 22 February 1993) is a Welsh Rugby Union player who plays hooker for the Wales women's national rugby union team and Gloucester-Hartpury. She made her debut for the Wales national squad in 2019 and represented them at the 2021 Women's Six Nations Championship.

== Club career ==
Lock began playing rugby at the age of 19 while studying at Swansea University. In an interview, she said that playing rugby is "where I truly found myself".

After going on to captain her university rugby team, Lock began playing for Gorseinon in 2012, and in 2013 moved to Swansea RFC.

Following a battle with cancer, Lock returned to rugby for the Ospreys in the 2015 National Fosters 7s, and in 2018 was named the team's Player of the Year.

In 2020, Lock signed with her current club, Gloucester-Hartpury.

== International career ==
Lock was called up to the Wales women's squad in 2019, five years to the day that she was diagnosed with cancer. She made her international debut against Spain in Madrid at the 2019 Autumn Series, and then represented Wales in the 2020 and 2021 Women's Six Nations Championships.

Lock has won six caps during her rugby career to date.

== Personal life ==
As a child, Lock attended Commonweal School, followed by Cirencester College and then Swansea University, where she graduated with a degree in bioscience in 2016.

In October 2014, Lock was diagnosed with Non-Hodgkin Lymphoma, which led to her deferring her third year of university and returning to her hometown of Swindon. She underwent six months of chemotherapy, and in April 2015 was officially declared in remission. Lock was considered clinically cured in April 2020.

After graduation, Lock took a role as sports officer for Swansea University, before becoming a sports development officer for Swansea Council in July 2017. Since May 2019, Lock has worked for not-for-profit leisure trust, Freedom Leisure, first as communities manager and then as sales manager.

Lock is also co-owner of didi rugby in South Wales, a youth rugby organisation designed to get young children active, teach them new skills and encourage them to have fun in a safe environment.

== Honours ==
- Osprey's Player of the Year 2018
- Swansea Sportsperson of the Year 2019
