= Exeter Chiefs Women =

- Full name: Exeter Chiefs Women's Rugby Football Club
- Union: RFU
- Nickname: Chief's
- Founded: 2019
- Location: Exeter, Devon, England
- Region: South West
- Ground: Sandy Park
- Coach: Steve Salvin
- Captain: Emily Robinson
- League: PWR
- 2025–26: 3rd of 9 (play-off semi-finalists)

Official website
- www.exeterchiefs.co.uk

Exeter Chiefs Women are a professional women's rugby union team based in Exeter, Devon, England. They were founded in 2019 to take part in the Premier 15s, the top level of English women's rugby. They are based at Sandy Park and are affiliated to Premiership Rugby's Exeter Chiefs. The side is coached by interim Head Coach, Steve Salvin. Emily Robinson captains the side.

== Creation ==
The creation of Exeter Chiefs Women was announced in September 2019 with former England women's national rugby union team players Susie Appleby and Amy Garnett announced as their first coaches. Exeter Chiefs announced they would be spending £500,000 to set up the women's team ahead of a scheduled audit of the Premier 15s by the Rugby Football Union (RFU) in the hopes they would be able to apply for a place in the league. Their intent was to increase participation in rugby in Devon and Cornwall.

In April 2020, as part of the review of the Premier 15s by the RFU, Exeter Chiefs Women were offered a place in the 2020-21 Premier 15s alongside Sale Sharks Women. The move attracted controversy as Exeter and Sale gained their places at the expense of Waterloo Ladies and Richmond Women, the latter of which was one of the most historically successful clubs in women's rugby. They were also criticised for not earning their place by promotion however some women's rugby analysts argued that women's rugby needed clubs that had the backing of professional men's sides in order to be viable in the long term.

In their debut season, the side finished 6th in the Premier 15s. In their second season, they reached the first final in their history, against Harlequins Women in the Allianz Cup.

== Premier 15s ==
Upon announcement of the team joining the Premier 15s, player recruitment was limited due to the COVID-19 pandemic. A number of internationals from various countries joined the club. They played their first match in the Premier 15s against Gloucester-Hartpury.

== PWR and Allianz Cup ==
Following the change from Premier 15s to the PWR, Chiefs finished 6th in the inaugural season. The following season the finished second in the league, and beat Harlequins 57–12 in the inaugural Allianz Cup.

Susie Appleby departed her role as Head Coach in 2025 after her contract was not renewed.

== 100 Caps ==
Captain Poppy Leitch became Exeter's first player to reach 100 caps in December 2024.

== Squad ==
Note: Flags indicate national union under World Rugby eligibility rules. Players may hold more than one non-World Rugby nationality.

Player	Position	Union
Sofia Bekir Fuente	Hooker	Spain
Cliodhna Moloney-Macdonald	Hooker	Ireland
Emily Tuttosi	Hooker	Canada
DaLeaka Menin	Prop	Canada
Abby Middlebrooke	Prop	England
Lilly Plowman	Prop	England
Hope Rogers	Prop	United States
Amy Rule	Prop	New Zealand
Hannah Sams	Prop	United States
Alessia Skeates	Prop	England
Demi Swann	Prop	England
Lucy Ward	Prop	England
Kate Smith	Lock	England
Linde van der Velden	Lock	Netherlands
Maisy Allen	Back row	England
Taz Bricknell	Back row	England
Zoë Dare	Back row	England
Abby Duguid	Back row	Canada
Maddie Feaunati	Back row	England
Edel McMahon	Back row	Ireland
Gabriella Nigrelli	Back row	England
Kayleigh Priest	Back row	England
Emily Robinson	Back row	England
Dorothy Wall	Back row	Ireland
Lola Whitley	Back row	England
Ellie Wood	Back row	England
Anna Woodman	Back row	England

Player	Position	Union
Charlotte Heath	Scrum-half	Scotland
Lucy Nye	Scrum-half	England
Flo Robinson	Scrum-half	England
Sammy Wong	Scrum-half	England
Maddie Flutey	Fly-half	England
Liv McGoverne	Fly-half	England
Hannah Bluck	Centre	England
Naomi Brennan	Centre	England
Gabby Cantorna	Centre	United States
Sophie Langford	Centre	England
Nancy McGillivray	Centre	Ireland
Danielle Preece	Centre	England
Alex Tessier	Centre	Canada
Eleanor Hing	Wing	England
Claudia Moloney-MacDonald	Wing	England
Sabrina Poulin	Wing	Canada
Eilidh Sinclair	Wing	Scotland
Eva Sterritt	Wing	Ireland
Katie Buchanan	Fullback	England
Merryn Elworthy	Fullback	England
Sammie Harris	Fullback	England
Francesca Granzotto	Fullback	Italy

== Notable players ==
The following are players which have represented their countries at the Rugby World Cup whilst playing for Exeter Chiefs:

Tournament	Players selected	England players	Other national team players
2021 (New Zealand)	17	Claudia MacDonald	Chloe Rollie, Eilidh Sinclair (Scotland) , Robyn Wilkins, Abbie Fleming (Wales) , DaLeaka Menin, Emily Tuttosi, Gabrielle Senft, McKinley Hunt (Canada) , Silvia Turani (Italy) , Charli Jacoby, Gabby Cantorna, Hope Rogers, Jennine Detiveaux, Megan Foster, Rachel Johnson, Kate Zackary (c) (United States)
