= Harlequins Women =

English rugby union club

- Full name: Harlequins Women
- Union: RFU
- Nickname: Quins
- Founded: 1995 (reformed in 2017)
- Ground(s): Twickenham Stoop; Surrey Sports Park
- Coach: Ross Chisholm
- League: PWR
- 2025–26: 5th of 9

Harlequins Women, formerly known as Harlequins Ladies, are a women's rugby union club based in Guildford, Surrey, England and in Twickenham, Middlesex, England. They were founded in 1995 as the women's team of Harlequin F.C. and rebranded in 2017 after merging with Aylesford Bulls. In 2017, they were selected as one of the franchises for the new Premier 15s league, but they also cater for new, aspiring and social players within their 3rd XV squad.

== History ==
=== Beginnings ===
Harlequin Ladies F.C was founded in 1995 by two former Oxford University players, Kirstie Heslop and Vanessa Matthews, as the women's team of Harlequin F.C. They initially played their home games on the 2nd XV pitch at The Stoop, at Centaurs RFC, Grasshoppers RFC, Old Isleworthians RFC and at Harlequins' previous training base at Richardson Evans Memorial Playing Fields in Roehampton. They won their first league title unbeaten and were subject of a Channel 4 documentary.

After winning four successive league titles, in 2000 they were promoted to Rugby Football Union for Women Division 1. However, they were later relegated from top flight. Following the RFUW restructuring the leagues in 2007, Harlequins Ladies were placed in Championship 2 South East. In 2017, they competed in the National 2 South East league.

=== Reformation ===
In 2016, Harlequins announced a partnership with Women's Premiership club Aylesford Bulls Ladies. The agreement stated that Aylesford Bulls would become a part of Harlequins and would wear their colours but initially retain their name and at first split their matches between Aylesford, Kent and Harlequins' Twickenham Stoop. However the elite squad later moved to be permanently based at Surrey Sports Park at the University of Surrey in Guildford, with the 3s maintaining their links with the local area and keeping Old Isleworthians RFC as their training and playing base. Although in 2021, Harlequins Women 3XV moved to Hampton Wick Royal Cricket Club and formed Harlequin Amateurs Women. In 2017, Harlequins Ladies were awarded a franchise for the new Women's Super League, later renamed Premier 15s. In doing so, Harlequins fully took over Aylesford Bulls Ladies with Harlequins being confirmed for the new league in a full merger and would cease using the Aylesford Bulls name.

In July 2019, they changed their name to Harlequins Women.

=== Record attendance ===
On 10 March 2018, Harlequins Women played in front of a crowd of 4,545 spectators during a game against local rivals Richmond Women at Twickenham Stoop, establishing a record attendance for a British women's club rugby match.

The following season, on 30 March 2019, they beat their own record with an attendance of 4,837 for their last regular season league match of the Premier 15s season against Gloucester-Hartpury.

== Ground ==
Harlequins Women play their home league matches at Twickenham Stoop

In their early years they played most of their home matches at Surrey Sports Park in Guildford, Surrey. However, each season they played an increasing number of fixtures at Twickenham Stoop with four times in the 2017–18 season and a further six times in 2019–20. For the 2023–23 season, Twickenham Stoop became their home for league matches.

On 30 August 2018, it was announced that the Harlequins Women 3rd XV squad would be playing their home matches at the brand new facilities at Grasshoppers RFC.

== Current squad ==
The Harlequins Women squad for the 2026–27 season is:

Harlequins 20265–27 Premiership Women's Rugby squad
**Hookers**: (England) Amy Henwood; (England) **Connie Powell**; (Italy) **Silvia Turani**; **Props**: (England) Zara Green; (England) **Lizzie Hanlon**; (England) Abby Middlebrook; (England) Rose Platt; (England) **Hannah Sims**; (Wales) **Sisilia Tuipulotu**; (England) Ruby Winstanley; **Locks**: (Scotland) **Sarah Bonar**; (England) **Rosie Galligan**; (England) Grace Keel; (South Africa) **Danelle Lochner**; (England) Daisy Shackley	**Back row**: (England) Chloe Benjamin; (Wales) **Alex Callender**; (England) Amelia Koev; (Fiji) **Manuqalo Noame Komaitai**; (Scotland) Aisla Merryweather; (England) Maja Meuller; (England) Joy Okechukwu; (England) **Marlie Packer**; (England) Maddy Page; (England) Tyla Shirley; (Ireland) **Aoife Wafer**; (England) Nicole Wythe; **Scrum-halves**: (England) Amelie Bleriot; (England) **Lucy Packer**; (England) Millie Pearce; (England) Dita Shaw; (England) Alex Wilkinson; **Fly-halves**: (England) Ella Cromack; (England) Bee Leonard; (Italy) **Sara Mannini**	**Centres**: (England) Summer Charleswort; (England) **Sarah Parry**; (Canada) **Sara Svoboda**; **Wings**: (England) Daisy Aspinall; (England) Grace Compton; (England) Katie Shillaker; (England) Eva Sterritt; (England) Jojo Vosakiwaiwa; **Fullbacks**: (Wales) Aimee Bush; (Spain) **Claudia Pena**; (Wales) **Kayleigh Powell**; (England) Solana Shaw de Leon; (England) Lauren Torley
**(c)** denotes the team captain. **Bold** denotes internationally capped players.^{ST} denotes a short-term signing. Source:

== Club staff ==
=== Coaching staff ===
Role	Name
Head Coach	(England) Ross Chisholm

== Season summaries ==
	League			
Season	Competition	Final position	Points	Play-offs
2017–18	Tyrrells Premier 15s	2nd	76	Runners–up
2018–19	Tyrrells Premier 15s	2nd	77	Runners–up
2019–20	Tyrrells Premier 15s	2nd	57	Season annulled
2020–21	Allianz Premier 15s	2nd	73	Champions
2021–22	Allianz Premier 15s	4th	61	Semi-Final
2022–23	Allianz Premier 15s	5th	55	
2023–24	Allianz Premiership Women's Rugby	7th	29	
2024–25	Allianz Premiership Women's Rugby	3rd	55	Semi-Final

Gold background denotes champions
Silver background denotes runners-up
Pink background denotes relegated

== Club honours ==
=== Harlequins Women ===
- Premier 15s
  - Champions 2020–21
  - Runners–Up: (2) 2017–18, 2018–19
