= 2022–23 Premier 15s =

Season in English women's rugby union

- Countries: England
- Date: 19 November 2022 – 24 June 2023
- Champions: Gloucester-Hartpury (1st title)
- Runners-up: Exeter Chiefs Women
- Matches played: 90
- Highest attendance: 15,420 – Harlequins v Exeter, 5 March 2023
- Tries scored: 853 (average 9.5 per match)
- Top point scorer: (New Zealand) Liv McGoverne (Exeter)–180 points
- Top try scorer: (England) Lark Davies (Bristol)–23 tries

Official website
- www.premier15s.com

The 2022–23 Premier 15s is the 6th season of the Premier 15s, the highest tier of English domestic women's rugby union competition (the 24th season including editions of the previous Women's Premiership), and the 3rd to be sponsored by Allianz.

The competition schedule was adapted to take place in a shortened timeframe, compared with previous seasons, in order to accommodate the 2021 Rugby World Cup.

For the second year running, the Allianz Cup took place alongside the league, with fixtures for this cup competition scheduled within the international windows during the season.

== Teams ==
As in previous Premier 15s seasons, 10 teams have been named to compete in the 2022–23 competition.

Club	Director of Rugby/ Head coach	Captain	Kit supplier	Stadium	Capacity	City/Area
Bristol Bears Women	(England) Dave Ward	(England) Amber Reed (England) Abbie Ward	Umbro	Shaftesbury Park	200	Bristol
Bristol Bears Women	(England) Dave Ward	(England) Amber Reed (England) Abbie Ward	Umbro	Ashton Gate	27,000	Bristol
DMP Sharks	(England) Jake Rodgers	(England) Georgina Roberts	Macron	The Darlington Arena	25,500	Darlington, County Durham
DMP Sharks	(England) Jake Rodgers	(England) Georgina Roberts	Macron	The Racecourse	8,500	Durham, County Durham
Exeter Chiefs Women	(England) Susie Appleby	(England) Poppy Leitch (United States) Kate Zackary	Samurai	Sandy Park	13,593	Exeter, Devon
Gloucester-Hartpury	(Wales) Sean Lynn	(England) Natasha Hunt (England) Zoe Aldcroft	Oxen Sports	Hartpury University Stadium	600	Hartpury, Gloucestershire
Gloucester-Hartpury	(Wales) Sean Lynn	(England) Natasha Hunt (England) Zoe Aldcroft	Oxen Sports	Kingsholm	16,115	Gloucester, Gloucestershire
Harlequins Women	(England) Amy Turner	(England) Rachael Burford	Castore	Twickenham Stoop (Note: Harlequins also play one home game at Twickenham on 4 March 2023, as the first part of a double-header at The Big Game 14.)	14,800	Twickenham, Greater London
Harlequins Women	(England) Amy Turner	(England) Rachael Burford	Castore	Surrey Sports Park	—	Guildford, Surrey
Loughborough Lightning	(Wales) Rhys Edwards	(Scotland) Rachel Malcolm	Kukri	Loughborough University; Stadium	3,330	Loughborough, Leicestershire
Sale Sharks Women	(Wales) Rachel Taylor	(Ireland) Lauren Delany (United States) Georgie Perris-Redding	Macron	Heywood Road	3,387	Sale, Greater Manchester
Saracens Women	(England) Alex Austerberry	(United States) Lotte Clapp (England) Marlie Packer	Castore	StoneX Stadium	10,500	Hendon, Greater London
University of Worcester Warriors	(England) Joanne Yapp	(Scotland) Lyndsay O'Donnell	VX3	Sixways Stadium	11,499	Worcester, Worcestershire
Wasps Women	(England) LJ Lewis	(England) Liz Crake	Hummel	Twyford Avenue; Sports Ground	—	Acton, London

== Premier 15s ==
=== Table ===
2022–23 Premier 15s Table
Pos	Team	Pld	W	D	L	PF	PA	PD	TF	TA	TB	LB	Pts	Qualification
1	Gloucester-Hartpury (C)	18	16	0	2	744	255	+489	119	39	15	0	79 (Note: Gloucester-Hartpury awarded win and 5 points for cancelled fixture against Wasps.)	Play-off place
2	Exeter Chiefs Women (RU)	18	15	0	3	904	205	+699	137	30	16	2	78	Play-off place
3	Saracens Women (SF)	18	15	0	3	792	315	+477	118	55	15	0	75	Play-off place
4	Bristol Bears Women (SF)	18	12	0	6	658	445	+213	100	64	13	1	62	Play-off place
5	Harlequins Women	18	10	1	7	628	407	+221	99	60	12	1	55	
6	University of Worcester Warriors	18	7	1	10	457	586	−129	75	89	11	2	43 (Note: University of Worcester Warriors awarded win and 5 points for cancelled fixture against Loughborough Lightning.)	
7	Sale Sharks Women	18	7	0	11	389	583	−194	58	92	6	1	35	
8	Loughborough Lightning	18	5	0	13	467	473	−6	75	74	7	2	29	
9	DMP Sharks	18	2	0	16	136	1006	−870	22	166	2	0	10	
10	Wasps Women	18	0	0	18	114	1014	−900	16	148	2	0	2	

Updated to match(es) played on unknown. Source: England Rugby
Rules for classification: Tiebreakers for teams tied on points: 1) Number of matches won; 2) Difference between points for and against; 3) Total number of points for; 4) Aggregate number of points scored in matches between tied teams; 5) Number of matches won excluding the first match, then the second and so on until the tie is settled.
(C) Champions. (RU) Runners-up. (SF) Losing semi-finalists. (Q) Qualified for play-offs.

=== Regular season ===
Fixtures for the season were announced by the Rugby Football Union on 17 August 2022.

==== Round 1 ====
19 November 2022
14:00

(1 BP) Sale Sharks Women	31–12	DMP Sharks
Try: Fielding 10' m Grieve 19' c V.A. Irwin 49' c Washington 56' c Pursglove 72' m Con: Duffy (3) 20', 50', 57'	Report	Try: Herrick 31' m Ishida 68' c Con: Ishida 68'

Heywood Road
Referee: Andrew Wigley

19 November 2022
15:00

(1 BP) Bristol Bears Women	64–0	Wasps Women
Try: Molloy 3' m Burgess (2) 5' c, 15' c Penalty try 21'; Murray 28' c White (2) 46' m, 49' c Osbourn-Clarke 65' m Phillips 70' m Johnes 74' c Con: Reed (5) 5', 16', 29', 49', 74'	Report

Ashton Gate
Referee: Hamish Smales

19 November 2022
15:00

Exeter Chiefs Women	17–25	Gloucester-Hartpury
Try: Jefferies 21' m Buchanan 74' m Moloney 79' c Con: McGoverne 79'	Report	Try: Bridger 3' c Hunt 33' c Lund 56' m Con: Sing (2) 4', 35'; Pen: Sing (2) 13', 70'

Sandy Park
Referee: Charles Gayther

20 November 2022
14:30

Harlequins Women	14–28	University of Worcester Warriors (1 BP)
Try: Cleall 49' c Heryet 73' c Con: Tuima 50'; Green 74'	Report	Try: Febrey 4' c Laflin (2) 17' c, 70' c Haley 52' c Con: Foxwell (4) 5', 18', 53', 71'

Twickenham Stoop
Referee: Adam Leal

20 November 2022
14:30

(1 BP) Saracens Women	34–21	Loughborough Lightning
Try: Campbell (3) 13' c, 31' m, 43' m Clifford 46' c G. Evans 80' +2 c Con: Wyrwas 14'; Williams (2) 47', 80' +3; Pen: Williams 78'	Report	Try: Bolger (3) 4' c, 54' c, 58' c Con: Hardy (3) 5', 55', 59'

StoneX Stadium

==== Round 2 ====
26 November 2022
12:00

DMP Sharks	0–95	Exeter Chiefs Women (1 BP)
	Report	Try: Nielson 15' c Doidge (3) 24' c, 34' m, 40' +1 c Buchanan (2) 28' m, 31' m Allen (2) 44' m, 74' c Robinson 47' c Ounsley 51' c Turani 54' c Woodman (2) 59' m, 78' c Johnson 66' c Jacoby 71' c Con: McGoverne (4) 16', 25', 40' +1, 48'; Cantorna (6) 52', 55', 67', 72', 75', 79'

The Darlington Arena
Referee: Alexander Thomas

26 November 2022
12:30

(1 BP) Gloucester-Hartpury	36–5	Bristol Bears Women
Try: N. Jones (2) 20' m, 36' m Venner 50' m Rugman (2) 55' c, 64' c Sing 68' c Con: Sing (3) 56', 65', 69'	Report	Try: Murray 25' m

Hartpury University Stadium
Referee: Ian Tempest

27 November 2022
13:00

(1 BP) University of Worcester Warriors	17–24	Sale Sharks Women
Try: Laflin 12' m Fleming 18' m Wright-Haley 32' c Con: Foxwell 33'	Report	Try: Roberts 42' c V.A. Irwin 50' c Washington 60' c Con: Duffy (2) 43', 55'; Benson 61'; Pen: Washington 9'

Sixways
Referee: George Selwood

27 November 2022
15:00

Loughborough Lightning	15–24	Harlequins Women (1 BP)
Try: Lingham (2) 54' m, 75' c Con: Nelson 76'; Pen: Nelson 30'	Report	Try: Konkel-Roberts 10' m Cleall 36' c Leaney 45' c Mayhew 79' m Con: McKenzie (2) 37', 46'

Franklin's Gardens

27 November 2022
15:15

(1 BP) Saracens Women	33–10	Wasps Women
Try: Loyola 18' c Rettie 31' c McMillan 36' c G. Evans 60' m Campbell 77' c Con: Williams (4) 19', 32', 37', 78'	Report	Try: Crake 68' c Con: Edwards 69'; Pen: Edwards 34'

StoneX Stadium
Referee: Charles Gayther

==== Round 3 ====
3 December 2022
11:30

(1 BP) Bristol Bears Women	84–12	DMP Sharks
Try: Johnes 2' m White 10' m Phillips (3) 17' c, 39' m, 72' m Coles (3) 23' c, 80' c, 80' +2 c Snowsill 24' m West 48' m Wilkinson 54' m Marston 58' c Sprague 66' c Bevan 78' c Con: Snowsill (7) 18', 24', 59', 67', 78', 80' +2, 80' +3	Report	Try: Haynes 31' m Smith 80' c Con: Ishida 80'

Shaftesbury Park
Referee: Michael Lamb

3 December 2022
13:30

Wasps Women	3–67	Gloucester-Hartpury (1 BP)
Pen: Edwards 22'	Report	Try: Rugman (3) 5' m, 29' c, 71' c Crabb (3) 18' c, 24' c, 43' m Goulden (2) 26' c, 40' +1 m Lund 56' m B. Lewis 79' m Con: George (5) 19', 25', 37', 30', 39'; Rugman 72'

Twyford Avenue
Referee: Katherine Ritchie

3 December 2022
14:00

Harlequins Women	19–10	Saracens Women
Try: Penalty try 31'; McKenzie 33' m Viksten 67' c Con: McKenzie 68'	Report	Try: Ellis 17' m Campbell 24' m

Twickenham Stoop
Referee: Dan Jones

3 December 2022
14:00

Sale Sharks Women	15–14	Loughborough Lightning (1 BP)
Try: Fielding 24' c Perris-Reading 65' m Con: Duffy 25'; Pen: Duffy 64'	Report	Try: Hibbert-Jones 2' c Malcolm 36' c Con: Nelson (2) 3', 37'

Heywood Road
Referee: Richard Gordon

3 December 2022
15:00

(1 BP) Exeter Chiefs Women	62–18	University of Worcester Warriors
Try: Zackary 7' c Fryday 16' c McGoverne 31' c Nielson 40' m Robinson 52' c Jefferies 56' c Allen 64' m Buchanan 66' c Muzambe 70' m Moloney 77' m Con: McGoverne (6) 8', 17', 32', 53', 57', 66'	Report	Try: Laflin 34' m Cox 75' m Fleming 80' m Pen: Nicholas 28'

Sandy Park
Referee: Anthony Woodthorpe

==== Round 4 ====
10 December 2022
11:30

Loughborough Lightning	7–54	Exeter Chiefs Women (1 BP)
Try: Field 4' c Con: Nelson 5'	Report	Try: Buchanan 8' c Zackary (2) 28' c, 55' c MacDonald 29' m Fryday 40' c Rogers 44' c Allen 61' c Sinclair 78' c Con: McGoverne (5) 9', 29', 40' +1, 45', 55'; Cantorna (2) 62', 79'

Loughborough University Stadium
Referee: Owen Taylor

10 December 2022
13:30

(1 BP) Harlequins Women	40–3	Sale Sharks Women
Try: Robinson 3' c Bonar 12' c Tuima 30' c Cleall 40' +1 c Scott 48' c Mayhew 51' c Con: McKenzie (5) 4', 13', 31', 40' +1, 53'	Report	Pen: White 35'

Twickenham Stoop
Referee: Holly Wood

10 December 2022
14:30

Saracens Women	7–53	Gloucester-Hartpury (1 BP)
Try: Kasolo 67' c Con: Aitchison 68'	Report	Try: K. Jones 3' m Hunt 13' c Lund 18' m Bridger 32' m Lewis 40' c Penalty try 45'; Rugman (2) 49' m, 57' c Tuipulotu 54' m Con: Sing (3) 14', 40' +1, 58'

StoneX Stadium
Referee: Michael Hudson

11 February 2023 (Note: Fixture rescheduled following postponement from original date.)
15:00

University of Worcester Warriors	19–38	Bristol Bears Women (1 BP)
Try: Phillips 20' c Shekells 25' c John 61' m Con: Foxwell (2) 21', 26'	Report	Try: Davies (2) 4' c, 39' c Lovibond 10' c Bern 28' m Compton 31' m Molloy 58' c Con: Reed (4) 5', 11', 40', 59'

Sixways
Referee: Alexander Thomas

11 February 2023
17:00

(1 BP) DMP Sharks	30–5	Wasps Women
Try: Ehrecke 15' m Bizer 33' m Treder 40' +1 m Thomas 45' m Craine 59' m Taylor 80' +1 m	Report	Try: Hillier 51' m

The Darlington Arena
Referee: Harry Walbaum

==== Round 5 ====
17 December 2022
13:15

Wasps Women	0–50	University of Worcester Warriors (1 BP)
	Report	Try: Callender (2) 9' c, 22' c Skeldon 14' c Farries (2) 40' +1 c, 52' m Wright-Haley (2) 44' m, 76' m Kershaw 78' c Con: Foxwell (4) 10', 15', 23', 40' +1; Nicholas 79'

Twyford Avenue
Referee: Holly Wood

17 December 2022
14:30

(1 BP) Bristol Bears Women	31–26	Loughborough Lightning (2 BP)
Try: Murray 7' c Bonner 10' m Davies (2) 43' c, 76' m Bern 59' c Con: Reed (3) 7', 43', 60'	Report	Try: Bartlett 16' c Field 21' c Williams-Morris 40' +1 m Penalty try 65'; Con: Nelson (2) 17', 22'

Shaftesbury Park
Referee: Andrew Wigley

18 December 2022
13:30

(1 BP) Exeter Chiefs Women	27–0	Harlequins Women
Try: Allen (2) 10' c, 32' c Moloney 23' m Rogers 39' m Con: McGoverne (2) 12', 33'; Pen: McGoverne 43'	Report

Sandy Park
Referee: Neil Chivers

18 December 2022
14:00

(1 BP) Gloucester-Hartpury	61–0	DMP Sharks
Try: Beckett 4' c Isherwood 11' c Hunt 14' c Gilbert 33' m Lund (2) 44' m, 71' m Matthews 62' m Cooney 67' m Aldcroft 73' m Else 76' m H. Jones 80' +1 m Con: Goulden (3) 5', 11', 15'	Report

Hartpury University Stadium
Referee: Benjamin Simpson

11 February 2023
14:00

Sale Sharks Women	5–71	Saracens Women (1 BP)
Try: Delany 37' m	Report	Try: McKenna 5' c Clapp (2) 7' c, 15' c Breach 17' c Campbell (2) 27' m, 44' m Grant 29' c Gregson 40' c Rettie (2) 67' m, 71' c Ellis 75' c Con: Harrison (7) 6', 8', 16', 19', 30', 72', 76'; Montiel 40' +1

Heywood Road
Referee: Hamish Grant

==== Round 6 ====
27 December 2022
13:30

(1 BP) Harlequins Women	48–14	Bristol Bears Women
Try: Cokayne (3) 8' c, 18' m, 39' m Konkel-Roberts 24' c Cleall 32' m Edwards 45' c Kildunne 73' c McKenzie 80' +1 m Con: Tuima (4) 9', 24', 45', 73'; McKenzie 73'	Report	Try: Davies 65' c White 79' c Con: Reed (2) 65', 79'

Twickenham Stoop
Referee: Wayne Barnes

7 January 2023
14:00

(1 BP) Saracens Women	89–0	DMP Sharks
Try: Aitchison (2) 3' c, 28' m Clifford 8' c Cleall (2) 16' c, 66' c Campbell (2) 19' m, 42' m Packer (3) 25' m, 51' c, 78' c Breach 38' m Clapp 46' m Grant 61' m Gregson 72' m McMillan 77' c Con: Harrison (7) 4', 9', 17', 52', 66', 77', 79'	Report

StoneX Stadium
Referee: Jonathan Cook

7 January 2023
15:00

University of Worcester Warriors	5–52	Gloucester-Hartpury (1 BP)
Try: Phillips 53' m	Report	Try: N. Jones (2) 4' c, 57' c Beckett (2) 10' c, 36' m Aldcroft 26' c Tuipulotu (2) 63' c, 80' c Sing 68' m Con: Sing (5) 5', 11', 27', 58', 80' +1; N. Jones 64'

Sixways
Referee: Richard Gordon

8 January 2023
12:00

Sale Sharks Women	10–35	Exeter Chiefs Women (1 BP)
Try: V.E. Irwin 40' +1 c Con: Law 40+2'; Pen: Law 8'	Report	Try: Zackary 5' c Ounsley 21' c Rogers (2) 33' c, 49' c Doidge 46' c Con: McGoverne (5) 6', 22', 34', 47', 50'

Heywood Road
Referee: Neil Chivers

8 January 2023
15:00

(1 BP) Loughborough Lightning	62–5	Wasps Women
Try: Field (3) 10' m, 33' c, 67' m Williams-Morris (2) 21' m, 35' c Weaver 40' +1 c Belisle 48' c Hibbert-Jones 69' c Andrews 78' c Bolger 80' m Con: Nelson (6) 33', 36', 40+2', 49', 70', 78'	Report	Try: Vaughan-Fowler 15' m

Franklin's Gardens
Referee: Iain Kiy

==== Round 7 ====
14 January 2023
13:00

(1 BP) Bristol Bears Women	48–21	Sale Sharks Women
Try: Bevan (2) 12' c, 23' c White 29' m Davies (2) 35' m, 67' c Reed 72' c Bonner 80' m Con: Reed (3) 13', 68', 73'	Report	Try: Washington 27' c Perris-Redding 44' c Delany 76' c Con: Duffy (3) 28', 45', 77'

Shaftesbury Park
Referee: Adam Wookey

14 January 2023
13:00

(1 BP) Gloucester-Hartpury	46–12	Loughborough Lightning
Try: Rugman (2) 11' m, 45' m Sing 14' m Hunt (2) 31' c, 60' m Tuipulotu 40' m Lund 51' c H. Jones 69' m Con: Sing (3) 32', 51', 57'	Report	Try: Field 28' c Malcolm 38' m Con: Nelson 29'

Hartpury University Stadium
Referee: Neil Chivers

14 January 2023
13:30

Wasps Women	0–71	Harlequins Women (1 BP)
	Report	Try: Cooper 6' c Kildunne (4) 23' m, 63' c, 65' c, 80' c Dobson (3) 33' c, 42' c, 50' c Chancellor 57' m Aucken 73' m Amory 77' c Con: McKenzie (8) 7', 34', 43', 51', 64', 66', 78', 80' +1

Twyford Avenue
Referee: Alex Rose

14 January 2023
15:00

DMP Sharks	5–53	University of Worcester Warriors (1 BP)
Try: Broom 23' m	Report	Try: O'Donnell 6' c Cox 13' c Bluck 36' m Phillips (3) 40' +1 c, 62' m, 67' c Farries 47' m Long 50' m Moreire 76' m Con: McNaney (4) 7', 14', 40' +2, 68'

The Darlington Arena
Referee: Rebecca Rees

14 January 2023
15:00

(1 BP) Exeter Chiefs Women	37–19	Saracens Women
Try: McGoverne 9' c Robinson 13' c Allen (2) 20' m, 51' m Zackary 23' c Rogers 32' m Con: McGoverne (2) 10', 24'; Pen: Cantorna 69'	Report	Try: Clapp (2) 36' c, 80' +1 c Rettie 63' m Con: Aitchison (2) 37', 80' +2

Sandy Park
Referee: Charles Gayther

==== Round 8 ====
21 January 2023
14:00

(1 BP) Saracens Women	64–20	University of Worcester Warriors (1 BP)
Try: Clifford 3' c McMillan (2) 14' c, 34' c Grant 23' c Campbell 44' m Infante 61' c Breach 67' c Moore 69' c Gregson 75' m Cleall 80' m Con: Harrison (7) 3', 15', 23', 34', 61', 67', 69'	Report	Try: Farries (2) 18' m, 29' m Skeldon 57' m Wright-Haley 63' m

StoneX Stadium
Referee: Holly Wood

21 January 2023
15:00

(1 BP) Loughborough Lightning	41–7	DMP Sharks
Try: Svoboda 5' m Williams-Morris (2) 22' m, 37' m Rollie 39' c Kabeya 42' c Bolger 44' c Goldthorp 53' m Con: Nelson (2) 40' +1, 45'	Report	Try: Brankin 73' c Con: Feury 74'

Loughborough University Stadium
Referee: Peter Caunt

22 January 2023
14:00

(1 BP) Sale Sharks Women	25–0	Wasps Women
Try: Perris-Redding 5' m Benson 32' c V.E. Irwin 45' m Howat 80' +1 m Con: Law 33'; Pen: Law 37'	Report

Carrington Lane
Referee: Adam Wookey

22 January 2023
14:30

(1 BP) Exeter Chiefs Women	41–0	Bristol Bears Women
Try: Moloney 13' m Cramer 45' c Rogers 49' c Turani 60' c MacDonald 68' m Con: McGoverne (4) 45', 50', 61', 68'; Pen: McGoverne 30'	Report

Sandy Park
Referee: Harry Walbaum

22 January 2023
14:30

(1 BP) Harlequins Women	22–33	Gloucester-Hartpury (1 BP)
Try: Scott 7' m Edwards 34' c Cokayne 56' m Kildunne 77' m Con: Tuima 35'	Report	Try: Lund 5' m H. Jones 14' c B. Lewis 25' c Aldcroft 40' +2 c Monaghan 67' c Con: Sing (3) 15', 26', 40' +2; George 68'

Twickenham Stoop
Referee: Neil Chivers

==== Round 9 ====
28 January 2023
12:30

Bristol Bears Women	5–36	Saracens Women (1 BP)
Try: Marston 13' m	Report	Try: Breach 16' c Clapp 20' m Packer 53' c Cleall 61' c Kasolo 76' c Con: Harrison (4) 17', 54', 62', 77'; Drop: McKenna 66'

Shaftesbury Park
Referee: George Selwood

28 January 2023
12:00

DMP Sharks	5–49	Harlequins Women (1 BP)
Try: Churm 55' m	Report	Try: Dow 8' m Armory (4) 15' c, 27' m, 31' m, 49' m Cokayne 40' +1 c Dobson 60' m Comerford 66' m Con: MzKenzie 16'; Tuima 40' +2

The Darlington Arena
Referee: Adam Wookey

28 January 2023
15:00

(1 BP) Gloucester-Hartpury	41–7	Sale Sharks Women
Try: N. Jones 14' m Rugman 18' c K. Jones 23' c Aldcroft 50' m Powell (2) 56' m, 66' m Tandy 80' +1 c Con: Goulden (3) 19', 23', 80' +2	Report	Try: Antwis 73' c Con: Duffy 73'

Kingsholm
Referee: Katherine Ritchie

28 January 2023
13:30

Wasps Women	0–84	Exeter Chiefs Women (1 BP)
	Report	Try: Tuttosi 10' c McGoverne (2) 19' c, 28' c MacDonald 38' m Johnson 44' m Sinclair (2) 48' c, 52' m Zackary (3) 58' c, 72' c, 75' c Robinson 62' m Sheehan 65' m McMahon 68' m Rogers 77' c Con: Cramer (4) 20', 29', 49', 58'; McGoverne (3) 73', 76', 78'

Twyford Avenue
Referee: Jonathan Cook

28 January 2023
15:00

(1 BP) University of Worcester Warriors	28–19	Loughborough Lightning
Try: Kershaw 24' c Farries 55' c Long 62' c Laflin 67' c Con: Yamamoto (4) 25', 56', 63', 68'	Report	Try: Westcombe-Evans 5' c Rollie 16' c Field 29' m Con: Nelson (2) 6', 17'

Sixways
Referee: Hamish Grant

==== Round 10 ====
4 February 2023
12:00

(1 BP) Exeter Chiefs Women	61–0	DMP Sharks
Try: Nielson 10' c MacDonald 35' c Jefferies 46' c Cantorna 56' c Zackary 57' c Moloney 68' m McGillivray 74' c Johnson (2) 76' c, 78' c Con: Cantorna (8) 11', 36', 47', 56', 58', 75', 77', 79'	Report

Sandy Park
Referee: Jonathan Cook

4 February 2023
12:30

(1 BP) Bristol Bears Women	17–19	Gloucester-Hartpury
Try: Pam 35' c Reed 44' m Davies 54' m Con: Snowsill 36'	Report	Try: Sing 16' c Lund 22' m Rugman 38' c Con: Sing (2) 17', 39'

Shaftesbury Park
Referee: Adam Leal

4 February 2023
13:30

Wasps Women	3–78	Saracens Women (1 BP)
Pen: Lennon 52'	Report	Try: Rettie (3) 5' m, 13' c, 57' m Alejandro (2) 9' m, 40' c McKenna 20' c Ellis 26' c Cleall 33' c Grant (2) 37' c, 42' c Wyrwas 46' c Green 74' c Con: Harrison (8) 14', 21', 27', 34', 38', 40' +1, 43', 47'; Williams 75'

Twyford Avenue
Referee: Adam Wookey

4 February 2023
14:30

(1 BP) Sale Sharks Women	36–34	University of Worcester Warriors (2 BP)
Try: Howard 3' c Thorpe 13' m Perris-Redding 47' c Grieve 52' c Washington 77' m Con: Duffy 4'; V.A. Irwin (2) 48', 53'	Report	Try: Phillips (3) 18' m, 27' c, 60' m Thompson (2) 24' m, 67' m Gondwe 80' c Con: Yamamoto (2) 27', 80' +1

Heywood Road
Referee: Jonathan Cook

5 February 2023
14:30

(1 BP) Harlequins Women	39–17	Loughborough Lightning
Try: Edwards 13' c Kildunne 22' m McKenzie 29' c Sims 40' +1 m Chancellor 52' m Corson 80' c Con: McKenzie (3) 14', 30', 80' +1; Pen: McKenzie 75'	Report	Try: Meuller (2) 2' m, 35' m Kabeya 61' c Con: Nelson 62'

Twickenham Stoop
Referee: Michael Hudson

==== Round 11 ====
18 February 2023
14:00

(1 BP) Saracens Women	32–12	Harlequins Women
Try: Breach 16' m Packer 22' m Grant 27' m Harrison 31' m Cleall 35' c Rettie 80' +1 m Con: Harrison 36'	Report	Try: Tuima 45' c McKenzie 54' m Con: McKenzie 46'

StoneX Stadium
Attendance: 2,992
Referee: Christophe Ridley

18 February 2023
15:00

(1 BP) Gloucester-Hartpury	0–0 (Note: Match cancelled because Wasps were unable to field a team due to insufficient player availability. Gloucester-Hartpury were awarded a win and five points in the league table.)	Wasps Women

Hartpury University Stadium

18 February 2023
16:00

University of Worcester Warriors	5–57	Exeter Chiefs Women (1 BP)
Try: Farries 33' m	Report	Try: Rogers (2) 11' c, 45' c Jefferies 18' c MacDonald (3) 38' m, 69' c, 79' c Allen 52' c Moloney 55' c Con: McGoverne (7) 12', 19', 46', 53', 57', 70', 80'; Pen: McGoverne 73'

Sixways
Referee: Harry Walbaum

18 February 2023
17:30

DMP Sharks	7–55	Bristol Bears Women (1 BP)
Try: Cowan 80' +1 c Con: Ishida 80' +2	Report	Try: Davies (2) 4' c, 37' c Reed 11' c Fleming (2) 17' c, 45' m Barwick 54' c Bonner (2) 62' m, 72' m Lovibond 74' m Con: Reed (4) 5', 12', 18', 38'; Skuse 55'

The Darlington Arena
Referee: Jack Makepeace

18 February 2023
17:30

Loughborough Lightning	17–10	Sale Sharks Women (1 BP)
Try: Williams-Morris 25' c Field (2) 66' m, 70' m Con: Nelson 26'	Report	Try: Thorpe 14' m Morrissey 34' m

Loughborough University Stadium
Referee: George Selwood

==== Round 12 ====
25 February 2023
12:30

(1 BP) Gloucester-Hartpury	27–36	Saracens Women (1 BP)
Try: Penalty try 32'; Bridger (2) 35' m, 59' m Lund (2) 69' m, 79' m	Report	Try: Packer (2) 40' +1 c, 51' c Breach 43' m Clifford 64' c Cleall 71' c Con: Williams (4) 40' +2, 52', 65', 72'; Pen: Williams 23'

Kingsholm
Referee: Anthony Woodthorpe

25 February 2023
13:00

(1 BP) Bristol Bears Women	59–10	University of Worcester Warriors
Try: White 10' m Murray (2) 19' c, 62' c Davies (2) 24' m, 55' c Lovibond 26' c Molloy 32' c Bevan 58' c Nigrelli 69' c Con: Reed (5) 20', 27', 33', 56', 59'; Burgess 63'; Bevan 70'	Report	Try: Harries 37' m Brincat 52' m

Shaftesbury Park
Referee: Neil Chivers

25 February 2023
13:30

Wasps Women	12–36	DMP Sharks (1 BP)
Try: Farrow 23' m Tuck 30' c Con: Lennon 31'	Report	Try: Haynes 8' m Ehrecke 14' c Cowan (2) 36' c, 56' m Smith 69' c Kacirkova 79' m Con: Feury (3) 15', 37', 70'

Twyford Avenue
Referee: Charles Gayther

25 February 2023
15:00

(1 BP) Exeter Chiefs Women	45–5	Loughborough Lightning
Try: Rogers (2) 19' c, 45' c Allen (3) 22' c, 56' m, 79' m Johnson 36' c Leitch 74' c Con: McGoverne (5) 20', 23', 37', 46', 75'	Report	Try: Kabeya 31' m

Sandy Park
Referee: Michael Hudson

26 February 2023
14:00

Sale Sharks Women	21–31	Harlequins Women (1 BP)
Try: McLachlan 5' c V.E. Irwin 32' c Kitlinski 80' +1 c Con: V.A. Irwin (3) 6', 33', 80' +1	Report	Try: Sims 11' m Cokayne 29' m Chancellor 54' c McKenzie 58' c Aucken 69' c Con: McKenzie (3) 55', 59', 70'

Heywood Road
Referee: Andrew Jackson

==== Round 13 ====
4 March 2023
12:00

DMP Sharks	0–60	Gloucester-Hartpury (1 BP)
	Report	Try: Hendy 2' c Bridger 15' c Else 26' m Powell (2) 37' c, 80' +1 c Blackburn 50' m Venner (2) 57' m, 79' m Goulden 67' m Hunt 75' c Con: George (5) 3', 16', 38', 76', 80' +2

The Darlington Arena
Referee: Samuel Yates

4 March 2023
14:00

(1 BP) Saracens Women	62–7	Sale Sharks Women
Try: Packer (2) 3' m, 12' c Clifford 25' c Breach (4) 28' c, 47' c, 62' c, 78' m Cleall (2) 34' m, 39' c Rettie 44' m Con: Williams (6) 13', 26', 29', 40', 48', 63'	Report	Try: Grieve 17' c Con: Duffy 18'

StoneX Stadium

4 March 2023
14:30

Harlequins Women	25–54	Exeter Chiefs Women (1 BP)
Try: Packer 24' c Dow 43' m Sims 62' c Con: McKenzie 25'; Tuima 63'; Pen: McKenzie (2) 22', 34'	Report	Try: Zackary (2) 3' c, 76' c Allen 13' c Johnson 36' c Jefferies 46' c MacDonald (2) 58' c, 68' m McGillivray 74' c Con: McGoverne (7) 4', 14', 37', 47', 59', 75', 77'

Twickenham
Attendance: 15,420 (Note: Attendance reported as a new world record for a women's club rugby match.)
Referee: Dan Jones

4 March 2023
15:00

(1 BP) Loughborough Lightning	22–57	Bristol Bears Women (1 BP)
Try: Goldthorp (2) 7' m, 29' m Tasker 71' m Williams 77' c Con: Nelson 78'	Report	Try: Compton (3) 1' c, 3' c, 49' m Snowsill 12' c Davies 23' c Lovibond 33' m Bern 40' c Fleming 70' m Pam 80' c Con: Reed (5) 2', 4', 13', 24', 40' +1; Bevan 80' +1

cinch Stadium at Franklin's Gardens
Referee: Alexander Thomas

5 March 2023
13:00

(1 BP) University of Worcester Warriors	57–28	Wasps Women (1 BP)
Try: Lewis 4' c Moss 9' c Laflin (2) 14' c, 54' m Phillips 21' m Clark 34' m Bricknell 46' c Cox 67' m Skeldon 80' +1 c Con: Foxwell (4) 5', 10', 17', 57'; Yamamoto 80' +2	Report	Try: Dougan 7' c Ball 31' c Stock 40' +1 c Caux 73' c Con: Edwards (4) 8', 32', 40' +2, 74'

Sixways
Referee: Adam Wookey

==== Round 14 ====
11 March 2023
12:30

(1 BP) Bristol Bears Women	31–26	Harlequins Women (2 BP)
Try: Marston (2) 13' c, 60' c Davies (2) 25' c, 47' m Bern 76' m Con: Reed (3) 14', 26', 61'	Report	Try: Cokayne 4' m Cowell 28' c Wilcock 40' +1 c Chancellor 68' c Con: McKenzie (3) 29', 40' +2, 69'

Shaftesbury Park
Referee: Charles Gayther

11 March 2023
13:30

Wasps Women	5–70	Loughborough Lightning (1 BP)
Try: Saunders 12' m	Report	Try: Lingham (3) 5' c, 20' c, 26' m Malcolm (3) 29' c, 40' m, 50' m Davey 34' m Williams-Morris (2) 44' m, 69' m Westcombe-Evans (2) 61' c, 75' m Clifford 65' c Con: Nelson (4) 6', 21', 30', 62'; Hardy 66'

Twyford Avenue
Referee: Harry Walbaum

11 March 2023
14:00

DMP Sharks	0–73	Saracens Women (1 BP)
	Report	Try: Kasolo (2) 6' c, 71' m Alejandro (2) 9' m, 30' m Grant (4) 14' m, 51' m, 57' m, 73' c Breach (2) 18' m, 20' m Cleall 24' c Rettie 63' c Wyrwas 77' m Con: Aitchison (2) 7', 25'; Williams (2) 64', 74'

Greenwood Road, Billingham (Note: Match relocated from the original venue of The Darlington Arena due to a frozen pitch.)
Referee: Hamish Smales

11 March 2023
17:00

(1 BP) Gloucester-Hartpury	50–12	University of Worcester Warriors
Try: Bridger 13' m K. Jones (2) 18' c, 44' m Venner 31' c Beckett 36' c Goulden 39' m Lillicrap 66' c Hale 75' c Con: George (5) 19', 32', 37', 67', 76'	Report	Try: Brincat 8' c Thompson 80' m Con: Nicholas 9'

Hartpury University Stadium
Referee: Adam Wookey

12 March 2023
12:00

(1 BP) Exeter Chiefs Women	52–14	Sale Sharks Women
Try: Jefferies 5' m Cramer 11' m Menin 22' c Fryday (2) 37' c, 63' c MacDonald 43' c Tuttosi 53' c Doidge 57' c Con: McGoverne (5) 23', 38', 53', 58', 63'; Cantorna 44'	Report	Try: Benson 32' c Tounesi 71' c Con: Law 33'; Cookland 72'

Sandy Park
Referee: Hamish Grant

==== Round 15 ====
13 May 2023
14:00

(1 BP) Sale Sharks Women	24–49	Bristol Bears Women (1 BP)
Try: Bawden (3) 21' m, 40' +1 c, 44' m Waters 76' c Con: Duffy (2) 40' +1, 77'	Report	Try: Bevan 2' c Davies (2) 29' c, 76' c Lovibond 34' c Bern 47' c Fleming 66' c Murray 80' c Con: Bevan (4) 3', 30', 35', 48'; Snowsill (3) 67', 76', 80'

Heywood Road
Referee: Owen Taylor

13 May 2023
15:00

(1 BP) Harlequins Women	80–7	Wasps Women
Try: Cleall 3' c Kildunne (4) 11' m, 17' c, 70' c, 77' c Leaney 13' c Dow 15' m Torley (2) 22' c, 64' c Mew 29' c Scott 45' c Latsha 80' c Con: Tuima (10) 4', 14', 18', 23', 30', 46', 65', 71', 78', 80' +1	Report	Try: Edwards 40' +1 c Con: Stock 40' +1

Twickenham Stoop
Referee: Jonathan Cook

13 May 2023
15:00

(1 BP) University of Worcester Warriors	48–7	DMP Sharks
Try: Cox (2) 8' c, 16' m Thompson (2) 14' c, 53' c Phillips 30' m Buckland-Harry 40' +1 m Varley 60' m Mattinson 64' c Con: Foxwell (4) 9', 15', 54', 65'	Report	Try: Cowan 77' c Con: Feury 78'

Sixways
Referee: Iain Kiy

14 May 2023
14:30

(1 BP) Saracens Women	29–22	Exeter Chiefs Women (2 BP)
Try: Botterman 19' m Clapp 25' c Grant 38' m Campbell 44' c McKenna 49' m Con: Aitchison (2) 26', 45'	Report	Try: Zackary 30' m Menin 40' +1 c Buchanan 69' m Allen 80' +1 m Con: McGoverne 40' 1

StoneX Stadium
Referee: Harry Walbaum

14 May 2023
15:00

(1 BP) Loughborough Lightning	26–40	Gloucester-Hartpury (1 BP)
Try: Mataitoga 31' m Field 58' c Lingham 66' c Rowland 74' m Con: Nelson (3) 59', 67', 74'	Report	Try: Hunt 11' c Rugman (2) 22' c, 48' m B. Lewis (2) 39' c, 44' c N. Jones 76' c Con: Sing (5) 12', 23', 39', 45', 77'

Franklin's Gardens
Referee: Alexander Thomas

==== Round 16 ====
20 May 2023
13:00

(1 BP) Bristol Bears Women	24–21	Exeter Chiefs Women (1 BP)
Try: Coles 10' m Bern (2) 25' c, 57' c Reed 60' m Con: Bevan (2) 26', 58'	Report	Try: Robinson 16' c Zackary 22' c Allen 38' c Con: McGoverne (3) 17', 22', 39'

Shaftesbury Park
Referee: Dan Jones

20 May 2023
14:00

DMP Sharks	0–74	Loughborough Lightning (1 BP)
	Report	Try: Field (2) 7' m, 48' c Talling 13' c Williams-Morris 17' c Mataitoga 20' c Davey 30' m Kabeya (3) 32' m, 40' +1 m, 76' c Rowland 52' c Hibbert-Jones 68' m Williams 79' c Con: Nelson (5) 14', 18', 21', 49', 80'; Rowland (2) 53', 76'

Loughborough University Stadium
Referee: Rebecca Rees

20 May 2023
14:00

University of Worcester Warriors	15–38	Saracens Women (1 BP)
Try: Phillips 15' c Laflin 48' m Con: Foxwell 16'; Pen: Foxwell 21'	Report	Try: Cleall 6' c Packer (2) 34' c, 66' m G. Evans 40' +1 c Breach 43' m Moore 53' c Con: Aitchison (4) 7', 35', 40' +2', 54'

Sixways
Referee: Alexander Thomas

20 May 2023
14:30

Wasps Women	7–88	Sale Sharks Women (1 BP)
Try: Cooper 34' c Con: Edwards 35'	Report	Try: Bawden (3) 6' m, 40' c, 70' m Thorpe (2) 12' c, 73' m Haungatau 21' c Perris-Redding 26' m Tounesi 37' c Delany (3) 44' c, 49' c, 77' c Benson 55' c Grieve 62' c V.E. Irwin 80' m Con: Duffy (7) 13', 22', 40' +1, 45', 50', 56', 63'; Grieve (2) 38', 78'

Twyford Avenue
Referee: Rebecca Piddlesden

21 May 2023
14:30

(1 BP) Gloucester-Hartpury	67–14	Harlequins Women
Try: K. Jones 4' m Monaghan (2) 8' m, 26' c Sing (2) 40' m, 45' c Heard 42' c Venner 56' m Bridger 64' c Rugman 71' m Powell 79' c Con: Sing (4) 17', 27', 43', 46'; George (2) 65', 80' +1	Report	Try: Latsha 58' c Dow 61' c Con: Tuima (2) 58', 62'

Kingsholm
Referee: Charles Gayther

==== Round 17 ====
27 May 2023
13:00

(1 BP) Exeter Chiefs Women	82–7	Wasps Women
Try: Zackary (3) 3' c, 23' c, 26' c Buchanan 5' c Johnson 19' c Turani 40' c Cramer 42' c McGillivray 46' c Sheehan (2) 55' m, 77' c Bradley (2) 64' c, 75' c Con: McGoverne (4) 4', 20', 27', 43'; Cantorna (4) 6', 24', 40' +1, 47'; Wilkins (3) 65', 76', 78'	Report	Try: Flanagan 80' +1 c Con: Linkins 80' +2

Sandy Park
Referee: Katherine Ritchie

27 May 2023
14:00

Loughborough Lightning	P–P	University of Worcester Warriors
	Report

Loughborough University Stadium

27 May 2023
11:30

Sale Sharks Women	14–48	Gloucester-Hartpury (1 BP)
Try: Perris-Redding 8' c Delany 11' c Con: Duffy (2) 9', 12'	Report	Try: Rugman 3' m Beckett (3) 24' c, 46' c, 76' c Bridger 31' m K. Jones 39' m Powell 66' m Neumann 68' c Con: George (4) 25', 47', 68', 77'

Athletic Ground (Note: The fixture was moved to The Athletic Ground, Richmond and the kickoff time changed to 11:30, so that Sale Sharks Women could support Sale Sharks Men in the 2023–24 Premiership Rugby final, which took place at Twickenham on the same day.)
Referee: Iain Kiy

28 May 2023
13:00

(1 BP) Harlequins Women	81–10	DMP Sharks
Try: Latsha 3' c Dow (2) 6' m, 20' c Mew 14' c Kildunne (3) 32' m, 78' c, 80' +1 m Torley (2) 40' m, 63' m Catlin (2) 52' c, 69' c Sims 56' c Wilcock 60' c Con: Tuima (7) 4', 15', 21', 53', 57', 61', 70'; Catlin 79'	Report	Try: Ehrecke 35' m Tonkin 71' m

Twickenham Stoop
Referee: Neil Chivers

28 May 2023
14:30

(1 BP) Saracens Women	48–38	Bristol Bears Women (1 BP)
Try: Campbell 11' c Packer (2) 20' m, 65' c Moore (2) 31' c, 46' c Clapp 56' m Grant 77' c Con: Aitchison (5) 12', 32', 47', 66', 78'; Pen: Aitchison 80' +1	Report	Try: Murray 2' c Davies (2) 26' c, 36' c Fleming 62' c Keight 68' c Con: Snowsill (5) 3', 27', 37', 63', 69'; Pen: Snowsill 40' +1

StoneX Stadium
Referee: Charles Gayther

==== Round 18 ====
3 June 2023
14:00

DMP Sharks	5–34	Sale Sharks Women (1 BP)
Try: Cowan 80' m	Report	Try: Kitlinski 16' m Thorpe (2) 20' m, 44' m Perrin 49' c Delany 66' m Washington 76' c Con: V.A. Irwin (2) 50', 77'

The Darlington Arena
Referee: Nikki O'Donnell

3 June 2023
14:00

Gloucester-Hartpury	19–58	Exeter Chiefs Women (1 BP)
Try: Bridger 8' m Neumann 37' c Tuipulotu 45' c Con: Goulden (2) 38', 46'	Report	Try: Rogers (4) 11' c, 34' c, 43' c, 53' m Zackary (2) 15' c, 40' m Tuttosi 60' c Bradley 76' c Con: McGoverne (6) 12', 16', 35', 44', 61', 76'; Pen: McGoverne 5'

Hartpury University Stadium
Referee: Sara Cox

3 June 2023
14:00

Loughborough Lightning	21–33	Saracens Women (1 BP)
Try: Kabeya (2) 32' c, 79' c Westcombe-Evans 49' c Con: Nelson (3) 33', 50', 79'	Report	Try: Breach 7' c Cleall 38' c Campbell 42' c Ellis 66' c Wardle 76' m Con: Aitchison (4) 8', 39', 42', 67'

Franklin's Gardens
Referee: Dan Jones

3 June 2023
14:00

(1 BP) University of Worcester Warriors	33–33	Harlequins Women (1 BP)
Try: Gondwe 12' c Skeldon (2) 54' m, 63' c Brincat 70' c Kershaw 79' c Con: Yamamoto (4) 13', 64', 71', 80'	Report	Try: Brooks 7' c Kildunne 17' c McKenzie 35' c Leaney 67' c Latsha 75' m Con: Tuima (4) 8', 18', 36', 68'

Sixways
Referee: Alexander Thomas

3 June 2023
14:00

(1 BP) Wasps Women	22–41	Bristol Bears Women (1 BP)
Try: Musgrove 15' m Vaughan-Fowler 22' c Blanco 30' m Lewis 80' +1 m Con: Edwards 23'	Report	Try: Bonner 8' m White 26' m Davies (3) 51' m, 59' m, 63' c Smale 73' c Molloy 78' c Con: Wilkinson (3) 64', 74', 79'

Twyford Avenue
Referee: Harry Walbaum

=== Play-offs ===
As in previous seasons, the top four teams in the Premier 15s table, following the conclusion of the regular season, contest the play-off semi-finals in a 1st vs 4th and 2nd vs 3rd format, with the higher ranking team having home advantage. The two winners of the semi-finals then meet in the Premier 15s final on 24 June 2023.

Semi-finals
1	Gloucester-Hartpury	21
4	Bristol Bears Women	12
2	Exeter Chiefs Women	24
3	Saracens Women	21

Final
1	Gloucester-Hartpury	34
2	Exeter Chiefs Women	19

==== Semi-finals ====
10 June 2023
15:00

Gloucester-Hartpury (1)	21–12	(4) Bristol Bears Women
Try: Beckett 4' c K. Jones 31' c Lund 68' c Con: Sing (3/3) 5', 31', 69'	Report	Try: Davies (2) 47' c, 61' m Con: Snowsill (1/2) 48'

Kingsholm
Referee: Alexander Thomas

Team details

FB	15	(England) Emma Sing
RW	14	(England) Ellie Rugman
OC	13	(England) Rachel Lund
IC	12	(England) Tatyana Heard
LW	11	(England) Mia Venner
FH	10	(Wales) Lleucu George
SH	9	(England) Natasha Hunt (cc)
N8	8	(England) Sarah Beckett
OF	7	(Wales) Bethan Lewis
BF	6	(England) Alex Matthews
RL	5	(England) Zoe Aldcroft (cc)
LL	4	(Ireland) Sam Monaghan
TP	3	(Spain) Laura Delgado
HK	2	(Wales) Kelsey Jones
LP	1	(England) Maud Muir
Substitutions:
HK	16	(Ireland) Neve Jones
PR	17	(Ireland) Kathryn Buggy
N8	18	(Wales) Sisilia Tuipulotu
PR	19	(United States) Maya Learned
FL	20	(England) Georgia Brock
SH	21	(England) Bianca Blackburn
FH	22	(England) Sophie Bridger
WG	23	(Wales) Lisa Neumann
Coach:
(Wales) Sean Lynn

FB	15	(England) Ella Lovibond
RW	14	(England) Amy Coles
OC	13	(England) Phoebe Murray
IC	12	(England) Amber Reed (c)
LW	11	(England) Deborah Fleming
FH	10	(Wales) Elinor Snowsill
SH	9	(Wales) Keira Bevan
N8	8	(England) Rownita Marston
OF	7	(Ireland) Claire Molloy
BF	6	(Wales) Alisha Butchers
RL	5	(England) Delaney Burns
LL	4	(England) Hollie Cunningham
TP	3	(England) Sarah Bern
HK	2	(England) Lark Davies
LP	1	(England) Simi Pam
Substitutions:
HK	16	(England) Holly Phllips
PR	17	(Wales) Gwenllian Pyrs
PR	18	(England) Ellie Mulhearn
LK	19	(England) Megan Barwick
FL	20	(Wales) Bryonie King
SH	21	(England) Lucy Burgess
FH	22	(England) Lucie Skuse
CE	23	(England) Grace White
Coach:
(England) Dave Ward

11 June 2023
15:00

Exeter Chiefs Women (2)	24–21	(3) Saracens Women
Try: Zackary 42' c Rogers 54' c Sinclair 79' c Con: McGoverne (3/3) 43', 55', 80'; Pen: McGoverne (1/1) 49'	Report	Try: Botterman 22' c McKenna 33' c Breach 69' c Con: Aitchison (3/3) 23', 34', 70'

Sandy Park
Referee: Charles Gayther

Team details

FB	15	(England) Merryn Doidge
RW	14	(England) Katie Buchanan
OC	13	(United States) Kate Zackary
IC	12	(United States) Gabby Cantorna
LW	11	(Scotland) Eilidh Sinclair
FH	10	(New Zealand) Liv McGoverne
SH	9	(England) Flo Robinson
N8	8	(United States) Rachel Johnson
OF	7	(England) Maisy Allen
BF	6	(Wales) Abbie Fleming
RL	5	(England) Poppy Leitch (c)
LL	4	(Ireland) Nichola Fryday
TP	3	(Canada) DaLeaka Menin
HK	2	(Canada) Emily Tuttosi
LP	1	(United States) Hope Rogers
Substitutions:
HK	16	(Ireland) Cliodhna Moloney
PR	17	(Italy) Silvia Turani
PR	18	(United States) Charli Jacoby
LK	19	(Netherlands) Linde van der Velden
FL	20	(England) Ebony Jefferies
SH	21	(Scotland) Mairi McDonald
FH	22	(Wales) Robyn Wilkins
FB	23	(Australia) Lori Cramer
Coach:
(England) Susie Appleby

FB	15	(England) Jess Breach
RW	14	(Scotland) Coreen Grant
OC	13	(England) Sydney Gregson
IC	12	(England) Sarah McKenna
LW	11	(United States) Lotte Clapp (cc)
FH	10	(England) Holly Aitchison
SH	9	(England) Leanne Infante
N8	8	(England) Marlie Packer (cc)
OF	7	(England) Sharifa Kasolo
BF	6	(Wales) Georgia Evans
RL	5	(England) Poppy Cleall
LL	4	(Scotland) Louise McMillan
TP	3	(England) Kelsey Clifford
HK	2	(England) May Campbell
LP	1	(England) Hannah Botterman
Substitutions:
HK	16	(Scotland) Jodie Rettie
PR	17	(England) Mackenzie Carson
PR	18	(Canada) Alex Ellis
LK	19	(Scotland) Fiona McIntosh
FL	20	(Ireland) Grace Moore
SH	21	(England) Ella Wyrwas
FH	22	(Wales) Flo Williams
WG	23	(Scotland) Isla Alejandro
Coach:
(England) Alex Austerberry

==== Final ====
24 June 2023
15:30

Gloucester-Hartpury (1)	34–19	(2) Exeter Chiefs Women
Try: K. Jones 4' m Lund 32' m Beckett 39' c Penalty try 41'; Neumann 73' c Con: Sing (2/4) 40', 74'; Pen: Sing (1/1) 56'	Report	Try: Tuttosi 28' c McGoverne 52' m Jefferies 78' c Con: McGoverne (1/2) 29'; Cantorna (1/1) 79'

Kingsholm
Attendance: 9,668
Referee: Dan Jones

FB	15	(England) Emma Sing
RW	14	(England) Ellie Rugman
OC	13	(England) Rachel Lund	(yellow card) 49' to 59'	(substituted off) 59'
IC	12	(England) Tatyana Heard		(substituted off) 69'
LW	11	(England) Mia Venner
FH	10	(Wales) Lleucu George		(substituted off) 63'
SH	9	(England) Natasha Hunt (cc)
N8	8	(England) Sarah Beckett	(yellow card) 27' to 37'	(substituted off) 73'
OF	7	(Wales) Bethan Lewis		(substituted off) 53'
BF	6	(England) Alex Matthews
RL	5	(England) Zoe Aldcroft (cc)
LL	4	(Ireland) Sam Monaghan
TP	3	(Spain) Laura Delgado		(substituted off) 49'
HK	2	(Wales) Kelsey Jones		(substituted off) 63'
LP	1	(England) Maud Muir		(substituted off) 72'
Substitutions:
HK	16	(England) Connie Powell		(substituted on) 63'
PR	17	(Ireland) Kathryn Buggy		(substituted on) 72'
PR	18	(Wales) Sisilia Tuipulotu		(substituted on) 49'
LK	19	(United States) Maya Learned		(substituted on) 73'
FL	20	(Ireland) Neve Jones		(substituted on) 53'
SH	21	(England) Bianca Blackburn		(substituted on) 69'
CE	22	(England) Sophie Bridger		(substituted on) 59'
WG	23	(Wales) Lisa Neumann		(substituted on) 63'
Coach:
(Wales) Sean Lynn

FB	15	(England) Merryn Doidge
RW	14	(Scotland) Eilidh Sinclair
OC	13	(United States) Kate Zackary	(yellow card) 68' to 78'
IC	12	(United States) Gabby Cantorna
LW	11	(England) Claudia MacDonald	(yellow card) 42' to 52'	(substituted off) 68'
FH	10	(New Zealand) Liv McGoverne		(substituted off) 64'
SH	9	(England) Flo Robinson		(substituted off) 73'
N8	8	(United States) Rachel Johnson
OF	7	(England) Maisy Allen
BF	6	(Ireland) Edel McMahon		(substituted off) 52'
RL	5	(England) Poppy Leitch (c)
LL	4	(Ireland) Nichola Fryday		(substituted off) 52'
TP	3	(Canada) DaLeaka Menin		(substituted off) 62'
HK	2	(Canada) Emily Tuttosi		(substituted off) 61'
LP	1	(United States) Hope Rogers
Substitutions:
HK	16	(Ireland) Cliodhna Moloney		(substituted on) 61'
PR	17	(Italy) Silvia Turani
PR	18	(United States) Charli Jacoby		(substituted on) 62'
LK	19	(Wales) Abbie Fleming		(substituted on) 52'
FL	20	(United States) Ebony Jefferies		(substituted on) 52'
SH	21	(Scotland) Mairi McDonald		(substituted on) 73'
FH	22	(Wales) Robyn Wilkins		(substituted on) 74'
WG	23	(England) Katie Buchanan		(substituted on) 68'
Coach:
(England) Susie Appleby

Player of the Match:
(Wales) Lleucu George (Gloucester-Hartpury)
Touch judges:
Alex Thomas
Charlie Gayther
Television Match Official:
Andrew Jackson

=== Leading scorers ===
Note: Flags to the left of player names indicate national team as has been defined under World Rugby eligibility rules, or primary nationality for players who have not yet earned international senior caps. Players may hold one or more non-WR nationalities.

==== Most points ====
As of 3 June 2023

Rank	Player	Club	Points
1	(New Zealand) Liv McGoverne	Exeter Chiefs	171
2	(England) Lark Davies	Bristol Bears	105
3	(Australia) Bella McKenzie	Harlequins	97
4	(England) Emma Sing	Gloucester-Hartpury	96
5	(England) Amber Reed	Bristol Bears	90
5	(United States) Kate Zackary	Exeter Chiefs	90
7	(England) Ellie Rugman	Gloucester-Hartpury	77
8	(England) Maisy Allen	Exeter Chiefs	75
8	(England) Zoe Harrison	Saracens	75
8	(England) Ellie Kildunne	Harlequins	75
8	(Scotland) Helen Nelson	Loughborough Lightning	75
8	(United States) Hope Rogers	Exeter Chiefs	75

==== Most tries ====
As of 3 June 2023

Rank	Player	Club	Tries
1	(England) Lark Davies	Bristol Bears	21
2	(United States) Kate Zackary	Exeter Chiefs	18
3	(England) Maisy Allen	Exeter Chiefs	15
3	(England) Ellie Kildunne	Harlequins	15
3	(United States) Hope Rogers	Exeter Chiefs	15
3	(England) Ellie Rugman	Gloucester-Hartpury	15
7	(England) Jess Breach	Saracens	14
8	(England) May Campbell	Saracens	13
8	(England) Poppy Cleall	Saracens	13
8	(England) Bryony Field	Loughborough Lightning	13

=== Team of the Season ===
The 2022–23 Allianz Premier 15s Team of the Season, which was revealed on 25 June 2023, features players from six different clubs and 4 different nationalities. The team was selected by statistics from Opta.

Forwards
Number	Position	Player	Club
1	Prop	(United States) Hope Rogers	Exeter Chiefs
2	Hooker	(England) Lark Davies	Bristol Bears
3	Prop	(England) Sarah Bern	Bristol Bears
4	Lock	(Ireland) Sam Monaghan	Gloucester-Hartpury
5	Lock	(England) Poppy Leitch	Exeter Chiefs
6	Flanker	(England) Trudy Cowan	DMP Sharks
7	Flanker	(England) Marlie Packer	Saracens
8	Number 8	(England) Poppy Cleall	Saracens

Backs
Number	Position	Player	Club
9	Scrum-Half	(England) Natasha Hunt	Gloucester-Hartpury
10	Fly-Half	(England) Holly Aitchison	Saracens
11	Wing	(England) Claudia MacDonald	Exeter Chiefs
12	Centre	(Australia) Bella McKenzie	Harlequins
13	Centre	(United States) Kate Zackary	Exeter Chiefs
14	Wing	(England) Ellie Rugman	Gloucester-Hartpury
15	Full-Back	(England) Emma Sing	Gloucester-Hartpury

== Allianz Cup ==
2022–23 Allianz Cup

Tournament details
- Countries: England
- Tournament format(s): Round-robin and knockout
- Date: 17 September 2022 — 30 April 2023

Tournament statistics
- Teams: 10
- Top point scorer(s): (England) Emma Sing (Gloucester-Hartpury) (39 points)
- Top try scorer(s): (England) May Campbell (Saracens) (8 tries)

Final
- Champions: Exeter Chiefs Women (2nd title)
- Runners-up: Saracens Women

The entire pool stage of the Allianz Cup was contested before the start of the Premier 15s season. The Premier 15s clubs were ranked by their previous finishing position and drawn in two pools of five, with clubs playing each other once in two home games, two away games, one bye week over five rounds. The top two teams in each pool will progress to the semi-finals played at the highest ranked clubs' venues (16 April 2022) as well a third-placed play-off and final. The Allianz Cup final was played at the home venue of the winning semi-finalist club with the highest points difference. In a change from he previous season, the teams ranked third and fourth in each pool also enter semi-finals as the first and second ranked teams instead of instant finals, which remains for the fifth ranked teams, which is to be played in two legs.

=== Pool stage ===
==== Pool A ====
Pool A
Pos	Team	Pld	W	D	L	PF	PA	PD	TB	LB	Pts	Qualification
1	Bristol Bears Women	4	4	0	0	154	64	+90	3	0	20	Semi-finals
2	Saracens Women	4	3	0	1	167	112	+55	3	0	15	Semi-finals
3	Loughborough Lightning	4	2	0	2	129	92	+37	3	0	12	5th/6th-place play-off
4	Sale Sharks Women	4	1	0	3	66	139	−73	1	0	5	7th/8th-place play-off
5	Wasps Women	4	0	0	4	42	151	−109	0	0	0	9th/10th-place play-off

Source: englandrugby.com
Rules for classification: If teams are level at any stage, tiebreakers are applied in the following order:
1. Number of matches won
2. Difference between points for and against
3. Total number of points for
4. Total number of tries scored

===== Round 1 =====
17 September 2022
13:00

(1 BP) Bristol Bears Women	48–7	Sale Sharks Women
Try: Mulhearn 4' c Lovibond 16' m, 48' c Keight 29' m Murray 40' +1 m Barwick 45' c Pam 61' c Stafford 67' m Con: Skuse (4) 5', 46', 49', 62'	Report	Try: Delany 7' c Con: Duffy 8'

Shaftesbury Park
Referee: Alexander Thomas

17 September 2022
13:30

Wasps Women	15–47	Loughborough Lightning (1 BP)
Try: Crake (2) 47' m, 78' c Con: Edwards 79'; Pen: Williams 16'	Report	Try: Allen 27' c Westcombe-Evans (3) 30' c, 43' c, 78' m Luthayi 40' c Hibbert-Jones 41' c Clifford 64' m Con: Hardy (6) 28', 31', 40' +1, 42', 44', 65'

Twyford Avenue

Bye/s: Saracens Women

===== Round 2 =====
25 September 2022
14:00

(1 BP) Sale Sharks Women	31–14	Wasps Women
Try: Pursglove (2) 5' m, 48' c Lyons 19' c Swailes (2) 34' c, 39' m Con: Duffy (3) 19', 34', 49'	Report	Try: McGuiness 21' c Bainbridge 61' c Con: Edwards (2) 22', 62'

Heywood Road
Referee: Nia Parsonage

25 September 2022
14:00

(1 BP) Saracens Women	33–66	Bristol Bears Women (1 BP)
Try: A. Evans 9' m Campbell (3) 15' c, 20' c, 32' c Alejandro 44' c Con: Exley (3) 15', 20', 32'; Martin 44'	Report	Try: Lovibond (3) 6' c, 13' c, 36' c Burgess (2) 11' c, 60' c Pam 40' +1 c Phillips 50' m Mulhearn 58' c Keight (2) 77' c, 80' +1 m Con: Reed (7) 6', 12', 13', 37', 40+2', 59', 61'; Skuse 78'

StoneX Stadium
Referee: Michael Lamb

Bye/s: Loughborough Lightning

===== Round 3 =====
15 October 2022
14:00

(1 BP) Loughborough Lightning	24–40	Bristol Bears Women (1 BP)
Try: Campion 11' c Field 25' c Prothero 32' m Tasker 55' m Con: Hardy (2) 12', 26'	Report	Try: Crompton 2' c Keight 21' m Nigrelli 36' c Johnes 46' c West 58' c Pam 69' c Con: Reed (5) 3', 37', 47', 59', 70'

Loughborough University Stadium
Referee: Hamish Smales

15 October 2022
14:00

Sale Sharks Women	14–38	Saracens Women (1 BP)
Try: Iwanejko 20' c Delany 29' c Con: Cookland (2) 20', 30'	Report	Try: A. Evans 3' m Fleetwood (2) 15' c, 37' c Moore 45' c Campbell 55' c Kasolo 78' m Con: Martin (4) 15', 38', 45', 55'

Heywood Road
Referee: Alexander Thomas

Bye/s: Wasps Women

===== Round 4 =====
22 October 2022
14:00

Saracens Women	23–19	Loughborough Lightning (1 BP)
Try: Clifford 12' c Campbell (2) 26' m, 66' m Con: Martin 13'; Pen: Martin (2) 57', 80' +1	Report	Try: Trevarthen 18' m Meuller 23' c Lingham 76' c Con: Hardy (2) 23', 77'

StoneX Stadium
Referee: Calum Howard

22 October 2022
15:00

(1 BP) Bristol Bears	C–C (Note: Match cancelled when Wasps went into administration.); HWO	Wasps
	Report

Shaftesbury Park

Bye/s: Sale Sharks Women

===== Round 5 =====
29 October 2022
14:00

(1 BP) Loughborough Lightning	39–14	Sale Sharks Women
Try: Waudby 3' m Bolger (2) 10' m, 39' c Tasker 17' m Swartz (2) 50' m, 63' m Lingham 56' c Con: Hardy (2) 39', 56'	Report	Try: Swailes 23' c V.E. Irwin 80' c Con: Duffy (2) 24', 80' +1

Loughborough University Stadium
Referee: Harry Walbaum

18 March 2023
13:30

Wasps Women	13–73	Saracens Women (1 BP)
Try: Lewis 14' c Con: Edwards 15'; Pen: Edwards (2) 23', 50'	Report	Try: Ellis (2) 6' c, 46' c Williams 10' c Montiel (2) 19' c, 52' c Rettie 25' c Kasolo 43' c Gregson 59' c Campbell (2) 64' c, 70' m De Filippo 80' m Con: Williams (9) 7', 11', 20', 26', 44', 47', 53', 60', 65'

Twyford Avenue
Referee: Leonie Pryor

Bye/s: Bristol Bears Women

==== Pool B ====
Pool B
Pos	Team	Pld	W	D	L	PF	PA	PD	TB	LB	Pts	Qualification
1	Gloucester-Hartpury	4	3	0	1	204	46	+158	3	1	16	Semi-finals
2	Exeter Chiefs Women	4	3	0	1	137	54	+83	2	1	15	Semi-finals
3	Worcester Warriors Women	4	3	0	1	54	82	−28	1	0	13 (Note: University of Worcester Warriors awarded 5 points for cancelled game against DMP Sharks.)	5th/6th-place play-off
4	Harlequins Women	4	1	0	3	76	83	−7	1	1	6	7th/8th-place play-off
5	DMP Sharks	4	0	0	4	5	211	−206	0	0	0	9th/10th-place play-off

Source: englandrugby.com
Rules for classification: If teams are level at any stage, tiebreakers are applied in the following order:
1. Number of matches won
2. Difference between points for and against
3. Total number of points for
4. Total number of tries scored
  Notes:

===== Round 1 =====
17 September 2022
13:00

University of Worcester Warriors	16–13	Harlequins Women (1 BP)
Try: Long 53' m Kershaw 72' m Pen: McNaney (2) 18', 25'	Report	Try: Aucken 43' c Con: Green 44'; Pen: Green (2) 51', 66'

Sixways
Referee: Samuel Yates

17 September 2022
17:00

DMP Sharks	0–73	Exeter Chiefs Women (1 BP)
	Report	Try: Woodman (3) 9' m, 29' c, 52' c Roberts 15' c Allen 18' c McGillivray 23' c Leitch 36' c Moloney 44' c Dererea 57' m Buchanan 74' c Fryday 76' c Con: McGoverne (9) 16', 19', 24', 30', 37', 45', 53', 75', 77'

The Darlington Arena
Referee: Rebecca Rees

Bye/s: Gloucester-Hartpury

===== Round 2 =====
24 September 2022
14:30

Harlequins Women	7–43	Gloucester-Hartpury (1 BP)
Try: Catlin 25' c Con: Green 26'	Report	Try: Buggy 3' c Penalty try 13'; Rugman (2) 37' m, 79' m Bridger 40' +1 c Tandy 43' c Venner 73' m Con: Goulden (3) 4', 40' +1, 44'

Old Surbitonians Memorial Ground
Referee: Tom Bird

24 September 2022
15:00

(1 BP) Exeter Chiefs Women	21–23	University of Worcester Warriors
Try: Allen 6' c Leitch 22' c Willet 49' c Con: McGoverne (3) 7', 23', 50'	Report	Try: McNaney 37' m Wright-Haley 57' m Febrey 78' c Con: Brough 79'; Pen: McNaney 9'; Brough 53'

Sandy Park

Bye/s: DMP Sharks

===== Round 3 =====
15 October 2022
14:00

(1 BP) Gloucester-Hartpury	20–24	Exeter Chiefs Women (1 BP)
Try: N. Jones 18' c Lund 49' c Con: Sing (2) 19', 50'; Pen: Sing (2) 40', 57'	Report	Try: Moloney 6' m Allen 34' m Van der Velden 70' c Nielson 78' c Con: McGoverne (2) 71', 79'

Hartpury University Stadium
Referee: Harry Walbaum

18 March 2023
15:00

(1 BP) University of Worcester Warriors	0–0 (Note: Match cancelled due to an insufficient DMP Sharks squad size.)	DMP Sharks

Sixways

Bye/s: Harlequins Women

===== Round 4 =====
22 October 2022
15:00

DMP Sharks	0–93	Gloucester-Hartpury (1 BP)
	Report	Try: Sing 3' m O. Jones (4) 7' c, 55' c, 62' m, 75' c Bridger (2) 11' c, 78' c Rugman (3) 14' c, 26' m, 39' c Buggy 23' m Hunt (2) 29' m, 70' m Isherwood 48' c Venner 58' m Con: Sing (9) 8', 12', 15', 24', 40', 49', 56', 76', 79'

The Darlington Arena
Referee: Samuel Yates

23 October 2022
15:00

Exeter Chiefs Women	19–11	Harlequins Women
Try: Allen 7' c Nielson (2) 61' m, 70' c Con: McGoverne (2) 8', 71'	Report	Try: Aucken 39' m Pen: Green (2) 11', 49'

Sandy Park
Referee: Alexander Thomas

Bye/s: University of Worcester Warriors

===== Round 5 =====
29 October 2022
13:00

(1 BP) Harlequins Women	45–5	DMP Sharks
Try: Wilcock 13' m Brooks 23' c Comerford 32' m Swords 54' c Heryet 63' c Dobson 78' c Mew 80' +1 c Con: Green (5) 24', 55', 64', 79' 80' +2	Report	Try: Cowan 37' m

Horsham RFC
Referee: Holly Wood

29 October 2022
16:00

(1 BP) Gloucester-Hartpury	48–15	University of Worcester Women
Try: Tandy (2) 5' c, 17' m Hunt 10' m Lund 22' c N. Jones 31' m Penalty try 39'; Rugman 43' c Isherwood 74' m Con: Sing (3) 6', 23', 44'	Report	Try: Laflin 78' m Cox 80' m Long 80' +2 m

Hartpury University Stadium
Referee: Jack Makepeace

Bye/s: Exeter Chiefs Women

=== Finals ===
==== 9th/10th place play-off ====
===== 1st leg =====
22 April 2023
14:00

Wasps Women	P–P	DMP Sharks
	Report

Twyford Avenue

===== 2nd leg =====
30 April 2023
14:00

DMP Sharks	P–P	Wasps Women
	Report

The Darlington Arena

==== 5th-8th place play-off ====
===== Bracket =====
Semi-finals
A3	Loughborough Lightning	44
B4	Harlequins Women	5
B3	University of Worcester Warriors	51
A4	Sale Sharks Women	14

Final
A3	Loughborough Lightning	5
B3	University of Worcester Warriors	19

===== Semi-finals =====
22 April 2023
14:00

Loughborough Lightning	44–5	Harlequins Women
Try: Lingham 6' m Tasker (2) 37' m, 76' c Burton 50' m Field 60' m Westcombe-Evans (3) 65' m, 69' m, 80' +1 c Con: Green (2) 77', 80' +2	Report	Try: Torley 14' m

Loughborough University Stadium
Referee: Jonathan Cook

22 April 2023
14:00

University of Worcester Warriors	51–14	Sale Sharks Women
Try: Clarke 4' m Cox (3) 9' c, 38' c, 80' +1 m Tremelling (2) 12' m, 36' m Wright-Haley (2) 51' m, 65' m Brincat 63' c Con: Foxwell (2) 10', 39'; McNaney 64'	Report	Try: Ramsbottom 30' c Moore 77' c Con: White (2) 31', 78'

Sixways
Referee: Melissa Wright

===== Final =====
28 April 2023
19:45

Loughborough Lightning	5–19	University of Worcester Warriors
Try: Waudby 9' m	Report	Try: Cox 26' m McNaney 36' c Brincat 40' c Con: Nicholas (2) 37', 40' +1

Loughborough University Stadium
Referee: Adam Wookey

==== 1st-4th place play-off ====
===== Bracket =====
Semi-finals
A1	Bristol Bears Women	12
B2	Exeter Chiefs Women	33
B1	Gloucester-Hartpury	21
A2	Saracens Women	22

Final
B2	Exeter Chiefs Women	29
A2	Saracens Women	19

===== Semi-finals =====
22 April 2023
14:15

Gloucester-Hartpury	21–22	Saracens Women
Try: Lund 8' c Bridger 31' c Sing 64' c Con: Sing (3) 9', 32', 65'	Report	Try: Ellis 17' c Campbell 53' m Clapp (2) 57' m, 77' m Con: Williams 18'

Hartpury University Stadium
Referee: Joe James

23 April 2023
15:00

Bristol Bears Women	12–33	Exeter Chiefs Women
Try: Coles 5' m Lovibond 28' c Con: Smyth 29'	Report	Try: Preece (2) 20' c, 64' m Moloney 37' c Jacoby 59' c Langford 80' +1 c Con: McGoverne (4) 21', 38', 60', 80' +2

Shaftesbury Park
Referee: Neil Chivers

===== Final =====
30 April 2023
13:00

Exeter Chiefs Women	29–19	Saracens Women
Try: Moloney (2) 25' c, 59' c Van der Velden 30' c Muzambe 71' m Con: McGoverne (3) 25', 30', 60'; Pen: McGoverne 40'	Report	Try: Kasolo 9' c Tansley 34' c Clifford 77' m Con: Williams (2) 9', 34'

Sandy Park
Referee: Alexander Thomas
