= Wheaton (surname) =

Wheaton is a surname. Notable people with the surname include:

- Amy Grace Wheaton (1898–1988), Australian educator, teacher, and feminist
- Anna Wheaton (1894–1961), American musical theatre actress and singer
- Anne Williams Wheaton (1892–1977), American publicist
- Anthony Wheaton (born 1970), American hip-hop producer and rapper known as "Sir Jinx"
- Belinda Wheaton, New Zealand sociologist
- Bryce Ford-Wheaton (born 2000), American football wide receiver
- Bob Wheaton (born 1941), Canadian backstroke swimmer
- Barbara Ketcham Wheaton (born 1931), American writer and food historian
- Charles Augustus Wheaton (1809–1882), American abolitionist
- Constance Wheaton (1908–1964), English table tennis player
- David Wheaton (born 1969), American professional tennis player, writer, speaker, talk-show host
- Elizabeth Lee Wheaton (1902–1982), American educator and novelist
- Elmer P. Wheaton (1909–1997), American aerospace and marine engineer
- Emily Wheaton, British-Australian actress
- Frank Wheaton (1833–1903), American Civil War general
- Frank Wheaton (tennis) (1876–1965), American Olympic tennis player
- Frank H. Wheaton Sr. (1881–1983), American businessman
- Frank K. Wheaton (born 1951), American agent and event producer
- H. M. Wheaton (1886–1944), American football player and coach
- Helen Wheaton (1839–1918), pen name of American author, economist, and editor Helen Stuart Campbell
- Henry Wheaton (1785–1848), American theorist of international law and third Reporter to the Supreme Court of the United States
- Horace Wheaton (1803–1882), American politician
- Gary Wheaton, Canadian-born American politician
- Gil Wheaton (born 1941), English footballer
- James Wheaton (1924–2002), American actor and director
- Joseph Wheaton, 18th-Century American law officer and inaugural Sergeant at Arms of the United States House of Representatives (1789–1807)
- Karen Wheaton (born 1960), American gospel singer
- Kenny Wheaton (born 1975), American professional football player
- Laban Wheaton (1754–1846), American politician
- Loyd Wheaton (1838–1918), American general
- Markus Wheaton (born 1991), American professional football player
- Nathaniel Sheldon Wheaton (1792–1862), American priest
- Paul Wheaton (fl. 1990s–2020s), American permaculture author
- Warren L. Wheaton (1812–1913), American businessman and philanthropist
- Wil Wheaton (born 1972), American writer and actor
- Will Wheaton (born 1972) American jazz musician
- William Wheaton (1814–1888), American politician and baseball pioneer
- William W. Wheaton (1833–1891), American grocer and politician, Mayor of Detroit (1868–1871)
- Woody Wheaton (1914–1995), American baseball outfielder and pitcher

== Disambiguation pages ==
- Anne Wheaton (disambiguation)
- Frank Wheaton (disambiguation)
