= Coreen Grant =

Scotland international rugby union player

- Born: 30 January 1998 (age 28) Edinburgh, Scotland
- Height: 1.61 m (5 ft 3 1/2 in)
- Weight: 63 kg (139 lb; 9 st 13 lb)

Rugby union career
- Position: Outside centre
Amateur team(s)
Years	Team	Apps	(Points)
2016-2017	Darlington Mowden Park Sharks	4	(0)
2017-2018	Melbourne Unicorns		
2018-2019	Darlington Mowden Park Sharks	5	(5)
2019-2020	Saracens II	8	(20)
Senior career
Years	Team	Apps	(Points)
2020–2025	Saracens	35	(70)
2025–	Harlequins		
Provincial / State sides
Years	Team	Apps	(Points)
2024	Glasgow Warriors	1	(0)
International career
Years	Team	Apps	(Points)
2020–	Scotland	16	(20)

Coreen Grant (born 30 January 1998) is a Scottish rugby player from Edinburgh. She first played for the side in the 2021 Women's Six Nations Championship.

== Club career ==
Aged 16, Grant joined Murrayfield Wanderers, winning the Brewin Dolphin U18 Cup in 2014 and 2015. During her time there playing at under-18 levels she played alongside fellow Scottish national players Rhona Lloyd and Lisa Thomson.

She studied at Durham University and played for the university team. She captained Durham University to BUCS semi-finals in 2016–2017 season, and acted as Vice Captain in the 2018–2019 season, where the team reached the BUCS final at Twickenham - the first time the university had made it this far in the championship.

During her studies at Durham, she first played in the premiers club-level rugby for Darlington Mowden Park Sharks (2016–2019), playing in the Tyrell Premiership.

While studying at Durham she took a year abroad in Melbourne, where she played for clubs Melbourne Unicorns, winning the Victoria State Cup with Melbourne Unicorns.

Grant then signed her first club contract for Saracens Women in the Premier 15's in the 2020–21 season.

While studying at Cambridge University from 2019 to 2020, she also played for the university team, as well as playing for Saracens. At Twickenham in the 2019 Varsity Match for Cambridge University, she came to prominence, scoring the winning try in the 77th minute to win the game. The match was broadcast live for the first time on ITV. Grant said of the occasion, "Winning a Blue was about seeing women's sport recognised on equal standing, played on the same day and pitch as the men." The match and the team's victory was also reported by The Times, which named Grant as the star of the match.

In May 2025, Harlequins Women announced that they had signed Grant for the 2025–26 Premiership Women's Rugby season.

== International career ==
Grant represented Scotland at U20 level in a match against Belgium Ladies in 2016.

She received her first call-up to train with Scotland Women Premier XVs at the start of the 2019/2020 season, alongside fellow Saracens player Jodie Rettie.

Her first match day call-up came in February 2020 in the rearranged match against England in the 2020 Women's Six Nations, where she remained on the bench. During lockdown in 2020, she trained with the team at Edinburgh, her hometown.

In the 2021 Women's Six Nations Championship, she made her debut off the bench in Scotland's home fixture against Italy to receive her first cap.

She was selected in the Scottish side for the 2025 Women's Rugby World Cup.

== Personal life ==
Grant first played rugby at Royal High School, Edinburgh aged 11. During her time there, she was coached by ex-Scotland player Graham Shiel.

During a three-year stint in the States, living in Pasadena in Los Angeles with her family, she briefly tried American football, before returning to the UK and becoming more serious about rugby.

Grant completed a master's degree at Corpus Christi, Cambridge University, in Philosophy (MPhil), Criticism and Culture in 2020 and studied English Literature at Durham University (2015–2019).

== Honours ==
- Player of the Match in the Women's Varsity Match in December 2019
- Player of the Match award at Murrayfield in the U18 Scottish Cup Final in 2015
- Winner Brewin Dolphin U18 Cup in 2014 and 2015
- Winner Victoria State Cup in 2018
- Player of the Match in the Womens Six Nations Wales vs Scotland Match at Cardiff Arms Park in 2024https://www.facebook.com/scottishrugby/posts/electric-%EF%B8%8Fthe-guinness-womens-six-nations-player-of-the-match-coreen-grant/915888043879343/
