= Liz Musgrove =

Scotland international rugby union player

- Born: 25 December 1996 (age 29) Edinburgh, Scotland
- Height: 1.69 m (5 ft 6 1/2 in)
- Weight: 64 kg (141 lb; 10 st 1 lb)

Rugby union career
- Position: Winger
Senior career
Years	Team	Apps	(Points)
2018–2019	Hong Kong FC		(0)
2019–2020	DMP Sharks		(0)
	Ealing Trailfinders		(0)
International career
Years	Team	Apps	(Points)
2018–present	Scotland	18	(0)

Elizabeth Mary Musgrove (born 25 December 1996) is a Scottish rugby player from Edinburgh who has played in multiple Women's Six Nations Championships, including the 2021 Women's Six Nations Championship, despite only taking up the sport at the age of 20. She is also a Junior British Judo Champion.

== Club career ==
In her first year of playing rugby, Musgrove helped Edinburgh University Women become the first Scottish team to reach the British Universities & College Sport (BUCS) final in 19 years. The side also featured fellow Scotland Women 7s squad members, Sarah Law, Rhona Lloyd, Megan Gaffney and Lisa Thomson, plus Scotland Women prop Katie Dougan.

On graduating from university, Musgrove played rugby for Hong Kong Football Club in the 2018–19 season.

Following her return from Hong Kong, she played for the Darlington Mowden Park Sharks from 2019 to 2020.

== International career ==
Musgrove was selected for the Scotland Women 7s squad in 2017 following a successful first season playing rugby and made a try-scoring debut in the opening match of the Rugby Europe Women's Sevens Trophy in Ostrava.

Musgrove was selected by coach Shade Munro for the 2018 Women's Six Nations Championship, where she won her first full cap in the opener away to Wales.

In 2019, and only three years since she started playing rugby, she took part in the qualifying tournament for the World Rugby Women's Sevens Series in Hong Kong. In the same year, she was also selected for a national tour of South Africa under coach Philip Doyle.

Musgrove was part of the 2021 Women's Six Nations Championship team. She started on the bench in the team's defeat to England, before coach Bryan Easson, brought her onto the starting line-up for the second match against Italy. This represented her first start for Scotland in two years. She played again in the closing match against Wales, which Scotland won 27–13.

Prior to the championship, Musgrove had not represented her country since before she moved to Hong Kong in 2019. During that time, she had also experienced a problematic hip injury which prevented her joining national games.

She was named in Scotland's squad for the 2025 Six Nations Championship in March.

== Personal life ==
Musgrove is one of several Scottish rugby champions who grew up in North Berwick. With a background in judo and athletics, she took up rugby in September 2016 as she embarked on her third year studying Applied Sport Science at Edinburgh University. In an interview with The Scotsman, she commented on her sudden transition to the sport, "Fast forward to 2016 and I thought I would give something new a try when my third year of university started in Edinburgh again in September – and a week later I was stepping out at BT Murrayfield for the Varsity match.”

Before this, she had represented Scotland as part of the U18 athletics team in the 400 metres and spent eleven years competing in national and international judo competitions, including winning a bronze medal at the Junior British Judo Championships in 2009.

During her year in Hong Kong, after graduation, she worked for Little Legends Sports and coaches the under-19 girls’ team at Hong Kong FC.

Following this, she continues her studies with a masters in clinical exercise science.

== Honours ==
- Winner of the 2016/17 British Universities & College Sport (BUCS) Championship with Edinburgh University
- Winner of the 2016/17 BUCS Championship Women's Sevens with Edinburgh University
- Winner of the 2016/17 BUCS Premier North League with Edinburgh University
