= Laura Delgado Dueñas =

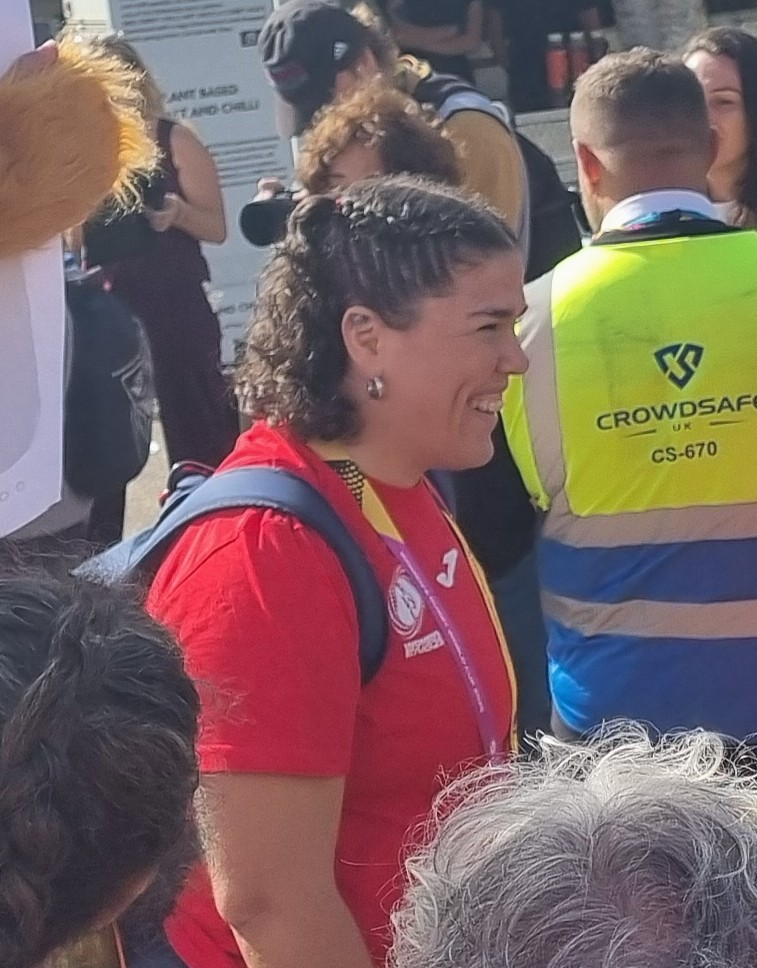
- 2025 Rugby World Cup in Northampton
- Born: 7 April 1990 (age 36) Jerez de la Frontera, Spain
- Height: 172 cm (5 ft 8 in)
- Weight: 93 kg (205 lb; 14 st 9 lb)

Rugby union career
- Position: Prop
Senior career
Years	Team	Apps	(Points)
2019–2020	DMP Sharks		
2020–2022	Exeter Chiefs	29	(20)
2022–2024	Gloucester-Hartpury	33	(5)
2024	Iberians Valencia	2	(5)
2024–2026	Harlequins	15	(5)
- Correct as of 11 September 2025
Provincial / State sides
Years	Team	Apps	(Points)
2022	Hawke's Bay		(0)
International career
Years	Team	Apps	(Points)
2015–2025	Spain	53	(20)
- Correct as of 9 September 2025

Laura "Bimba" Delgado Dueñas (born 7 April 1990) is a former Spanish rugby union player. She played as a Prop for the Spanish women's team internationally.

== Rugby career ==
Born on in Jerez de la Frontera, Spain, she grew up in a family of athletes who immediately pushed her towards the sport. She practiced shot put until she was 18, when she was injured in a motorcycle accident. It was then that she discovered rugby on the advice of a friend, with the Cádiz club. She gave up athletics to the great displeasure of her parents and her coach. In addition, the Cádiz club only played 10-a-side rugby, so she had to go to Madrid to play fifteens. Her build, leg strength and height earned her an immediate place in the front row.

She got her nickname "Bimba" from her very first match for Cádiz. Every time she charged with the ball in her hand, the crowd would exclaim "bimba!", an onomatopoeia that could be translated as "boom".

In 2014, she was injured and was not available for the World Cup. She made her international debut with the Spanish team the following year, against Netherlands. In 2016, she joined Tarbes Pyrénées rugby in Elite 2. She captained the Spanish team at the 2017 Rugby World Cup in Ireland.

In 2019, she signed with her first English club, Darlington Mowden Park Sharks. The following season, she signed with Exeter Chiefs where she stayed for two seasons and won the 2022 Allianz Cup.

In 2022, Spain having not qualified for the delayed Rugby World Cup, she decided to play in New Zealand; she sent a sports CV to the Hawke's Bay Rugby Union who agreed to host her while warning her that the Farah Palmer Cup players are not paid, and that she has no guarantee of having a place in the squad. Hawke's Bay won the Championship (the bottom division of the FPC) that year. She is the first European player to participate in a haka in the Farah Palmer Cup.

Immediately after spending a season in New Zealand, she joined Gloucester-Hartpury, where she won the 2022–23 Premier 15s season, facing her former club Exeter Chiefs in the final.

In 2023–24, although she still played for Gloucester-Hartpury, she also turned out for the Iberians of Valencia, she played in two matches against Italian clubs, Zebre Parma and Benetton Treviso. Back at the club, she did not participate in the final phase of the championship in order to participate in the play-off match for the WXV against Wales in Cardiff. Her club coaches, Sean Lynn and Andrew Ford, came to see her specially and at the end of the match presented her with her PWR league champions medal and a club jersey.

In 2024, she signed for Harlequins. During the WXV, she announced her decision to retire from international football at the end of the competition, or after the World Cup if Spain qualified.

On 11 August 2025, she was named in the Spanish side to the Women's Rugby World Cup in England. On 11 September, she announced her retirement from the Spanish national team.
