= Frank Wheaton (disambiguation) =

Frank Wheaton (1833–1903) was a military officer in the United States Army.

Frank Wheaton may also refer to:

- Frank Wheaton (tennis) (1876–1965), American tennis player
- Frank H. Wheaton Sr. (1881–1983), American business executive
- Frank K. Wheaton (born 1951), American attorney, agent, and actor
