= Anne Wheaton =

Anne Wheaton can refer to:

- Anne Wheaton, wife of actor and writer Wil Wheaton
- Anne Williams Wheaton (1892–1977), American publicist
