= Zoe Aldcroft =

England international rugby union player

Zoe Aldcroft OBE
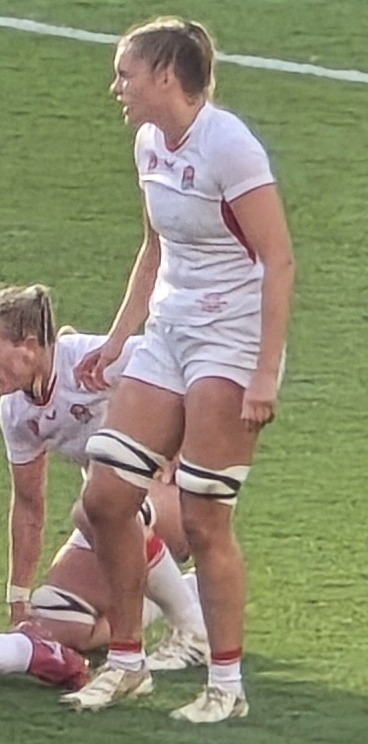
- 2025 Women's Rugby World Cup final
- Born: 19 November 1996 (age 29) Scarborough, North Yorkshire, England
- Height: 182 cm (6 ft 0 in)
- Weight: 85 kg (187 lb)

Rugby union career
- Position: Lock
- Current team: Gloucester-Hartpury
Senior career
Years	Team	Apps	(Points)
2015–2018	DMP Sharks		(0)
2018–	Gloucester-Hartpury		(0)
International career
Years	Team	Apps	(Points)
2015–2016	England U20s		
2016–	England	69	(55)
Medal record
Representing England
Women's rugby union
Rugby World Cup
Gold medal – first place	2025 England	Team competition
Silver medal – second place	2021 New Zealand	Team competition
Silver medal – second place	2017 Ireland	Team competition

Zoe Rosalind Stratford OBE (née Aldcroft; born 19 November 1996) is an English rugby union player. She represents England women's national rugby union team internationally and made her debut in 2016 against France. She was named in the 2017 Women's Rugby World Cup squad for England. In 2021, Stratford was named World Rugby Women's 15s Player of the Year.

== International career ==
Stratford's first full England cap came in the final four minutes of the England women's national rugby team's game against France in July 2016: she scored the try that won England victory.

She was offered a full-time contract by the RFU in January 2019.

Due to injury, Stratford missed the entire 2019 Women's Six Nations Championships but returned to play in the 2019 Super Series in San Diego.

She was part of the 2020 Women's Six Nations England team and was named the 2020 Rugby Players’ Association Telegraph Women's Sport England player of the year.

In April 2021, she was named Player of the Match after England's Six Nations victory over France.

On 10 December 2021, Zoe Stratford was crowned World Rugby Women's 15s Player of the Year 2021, with the following citation 'Named England captain for the first time on her 25th birthday, Zoe Stratford led the Red Roses to an 89–0 victory over the USA and marked the occasion with a try. Stratford started all eight of England's matches in 2021 as the Red Roses extended their unbeaten run to 18 tests and won a third successive Women's Six Nations title.'

She was named in the England squad for the delayed 2021 Rugby World Cup held in New Zealand in October and November 2022.

In January 2025, head coach John Mitchell named her as England captain for the upcoming Six Nations and World Cup tournaments replacing Marlie Packer. She was subsequently named in the Red Roses side for the Women's Rugby World Cup in England.

== Club career ==
Previously a student at Hartpury College, Stratford signed for Gloucester-Hartpury from Darlington Mowden Park ahead of the 2017–18 season: she missed her first season due to an ankle injury. In 2018, she returned to Gloucester-Hartpury to captain the side in the Tyrrells Premier 15s.

== Early life and education ==
Stratford started playing rugby at Scarborough, when she was nine. Her brother Jonathan also played for Scarborough. She also played netball and studied dance and ballet until she was 15, which she credits with giving her unique skills that she has brought to her rugby game.

She went on to play for Malton girls, West Park Leeds and Hartpury University R.F.C., and represented Yorkshire at U15 level.

She was a member of the England U18 Sevens team that became the inaugural European champions in Sweden. Stratford was educated at St Martin's Church of England School and Scalby School, before studying Sport and Exercise Nutrition at Hartpury College and completing a BSc (Hons) Sport and Exercise Sciences degree. She plans to study chiropody to prepare her for a post-rugby career.

== Personal life ==
Stratford has a knitted doll of England rugby star Jonny Wilkinson that she takes with her to every match.

Stratford appeared on A Question of Sport series 52 episode 3, hosted by Paddy McGuinness, with team captains Sam Quek and Ugo Monye. Other guests included boxer Conor Benn, England footballer Andros Townsend and world swimming champion Fran Halsall.

In 2024, Zoe Aldcroft married a rugby coach and former player Luke Stratford, but kept her surname Aldcroft in her professional rugby career. Aldcroft's first child, a daughter, was born on 30 September 2026.

== Honours ==
Gloucester–Hartpury

- Premiership Women's Rugby
  - Champion (3) 2022–23, 2023–24, 2024–25

England

- Women's Rugby World Cup
  - (gold) Champion (1): 2025
