= Lisa Neumann =

Wales international rugby union footballer

- Born: 23 December 1993 (age 32) Swansea, South Wales
- Height: 175 cm (5 ft 9 in)
- Weight: 71 kg (157 lb)
- School: Ysgol Dewi Sant
- University: University of Manchester

Rugby union career
- Position: Wing
- Current team: Harlequins
Senior career
| Years | Team | Apps | (Points) |
| | Haverfordwest RFC | | (-) |
| 2018-2020 | RGC 1404 | | (-) |
| 2018-2020 | Firwood Waterloo Ladies | | (-) |
| 2020-2022 | Sale Sharks | 31 | (45) |
| 2022-2024 | Gloucester-Hartpury | 13 | (15) |
| 2024-present | Harlequins | | (0) |
International career
| Years | Team | Apps | (Points) |
| 2018–present | Wales | 51 | (35) |
- Correct as of 24 September 2025

Lisa Neumann (born 23 December 1993) is a Welsh Rugby Union player who plays wing for the Wales women's national rugby union team and Harlequins. Neumann made her international debut in 2018, and represented the Wales squad at the 2021 Women's Six Nations Championship.

== Club career ==
Neumann began playing rugby as a child, first at Croesgoch Primary and then at Ysgol Dewi Sant. After playing for the Haverfordwest girls' team, she moved to Haverfordwest Ladies in 2016.

She then went on to play for the Scarlets and Firwood Waterloo Ladies, before signing with Sale Sharks, in 2020.

She has also played at a regional level for Rygbi Gogledd Cymru (RGC), the regional representative team for the North Wales Rugby Development Region.

Neumann joined Sale Sharks in September 2022 and scored nine tries over a season and a half. She was the Sale Sharks top try scorer in her final season at the club.

After moving to Gloucester-Hartpury in February 2022, Lisa featured regularly on the wing. On 24 June 2023, Neumann sealed victory for Gloucester-Hartpury, with a try six minutes from the end, over Exeter Chiefs in the Premier 15s Final.

On 8 February 2024, Gloucester-Hartpury announced she was leaving the team to join Harlequins.

== International career ==
Neumann made her international debut with RGC in 2018, in a match against Scotland. Also in 2018, she made her first start for the Wales women's squad in a Six Nations Championship match against Ireland. She then went on to play in every fixture in the 2020 Women's Six Nations Championship prior to the final match being postponed.

During the 2021 Women's Six Nations Championship, Neumann scored Wales' first try of the tournament against Scotland.

Neumann has won 49 caps during her rugby career to date. She was selected for the Wales squad for the 2021 Rugby World Cup in New Zealand. She was named in the Welsh side for the 2025 Six Nations Championship in March.

On 11 August 2025, she was selected in the Welsh squad to the Women's Rugby World Cup in England.

== Personal life ==
Born in Swansea, Neumann attended Croesgoch Primary and Ysgol Dewi Sant before moving to the University of Manchester, where she graduated in 2016 with a first-class honours degree in biomedical science.

Prior to completing her studies, Neumann worked for the RNLI as a senior beach lifeguard. In 2018, she moved to the Manchester Academic Health Science Centre Clinical Trials Unit (MAHSC-CTU), hosted by The Christie NHS Foundation Trust in Manchester to begin a role as clinical trials data manager. From February 2019 until June 2021, she worked as a senior clinical trials data manager in the academic Clinical Trials Unit at Manchester University before turning professional as a rugby player.

== Honours ==
- Neumann was the only Welsh player to be named in the Women's Six Nations 'Team of the Tournament' 2021, as chosen by former World Cup winner and television pundit, Maggie Alphonsi.
- 2022–23 Premier 15s Champion
