= Belinda Wheaton =

English cultural sociologist

- Born: 1966

Academic background
- Education: University of Brighton
- Thesis: Consumption, lifestyle and gendered identities in post-modern sports: the case of windsurfing (1997)

Belinda Wheaton is a New Zealand cultural sociologist, and is a full professor at the University of Waikato, specialising in sport, leisure and well-being research, including sports policy and gender research.

== Academic career ==
Wheaton studied sports science at Brighton Polytechnic (now the University of Brighton) before working as a postgraduate researcher in the sociology department at Goldsmiths' College. She completed a PhD titled Consumption, lifestyle and gendered identities in post-modern sports: the case of windsurfing at the University of Brighton in 1997. She followed this with a Certificate in Teaching and Learning from the University of Roehampton. Wheaton joined the faculty of the University of Waikato in 2015, rising to full professor in the Te Huataki Waiora School of Health in 2020.

Wheaton researches sports, leisure and well-being, and has written about the Caster Semenya ruling, snowboarding as a marquee event at the Olympics, and aging and action sports. She has also described the disproportionately high drowning rate in Māori and Asian communities, for both fatal and non-fatal drownings. Wheaton suggests that current water safety approaches are not effective for these communities, but that better cultural understanding and support for new migrants might lead to improved water safety for these groups. Wheaton is also interested in gender in sport and sports and leisure policies.

With Louise Mansfield, Wheaton is co-editor of The Annals of Leisure Research, which is the official journal of the Australian and New Zealand Association of Leisure Studies. She is also the Series Editor for The Critical Studies in Sport series published by Routledge.

== Selected works ==
=== Books ===
- Belinda Wheaton, editor. Understanding lifestyle sport: Consumption, identity and difference (2004) Routledge. 236pp. ISBN 9780415259552
- Belinda Wheaton, The Cultural Politics of Lifestyle Sports (23 July 2013) Routledge. 248pp ISBN 9780415478588

=== Journal articles ===
- Belinda Wheaton; Becky Beal (2003). "`Keeping It Real' Subcultural Media and the Discourses of Authenticity in Alternative Sport". International Review for the Sociology of Sport. 38 (2): 155–176. doi:10.1177/1012690203038002002. Wikidata Q124476704.
- Belinda Wheaton (2000). ""Just Do It": Consumption, Commitment, and Identity in the Windsurfing Subculture". Sociology of Sport Journal. 17 (3): 254–274. doi:10.1123/ssj.17.3.254. Wikidata Q124476707.
- Gilchrist, Paul; Belinda Wheaton (2011). "Lifestyle sport, public policy and youth engagement: examining the emergence of parkour". International Journal of Sport Policy and Politics. 3 (1): 109–131. doi:10.1080/19406940.2010.547866. Wikidata Q124476695.
- Holly Thorpe; Belinda Wheaton (2011). "'Generation X Games', Action Sports and the Olympic Movement: Understanding the Cultural Politics of Incorporation". Sociology. 45 (5): 830–847. doi:10.1177/0038038511413427. Wikidata Q123411054.
- BELINDA WHEATON (2000). ""New lads"? Masculinities and the "new sport" participant". Men and Masculinities. 2 (4): 434–456. doi:10.1177/1097184x00002004004. Wikidata Q124476708.
