= Holly Thorpe =

New Zealand sociologist and academic

- Awards: James Cook Research Fellowship, Fulbright Scholarship, Leverhulme Fellowship, Royal Society Te Apārangi Early Career Research Excellence Award for Social Sciences

Academic background
- Education: University of Waikato
- Thesis: Boarders, Babes and Bad-Asses: Theories of a Female Physical Youth Culture (2007)
- Doctoral advisor: Doug Booth, Toni Bruce, Richard Pringle

Holly Alysha Thorpe is a New Zealand academic, and is a full professor at the University of Waikato, specialising in sports sociology.

== Academic career ==
Thorpe was a competitive snowboarder. She completed a PhD titled Boarders, Babes and Bad-Asses: Theories of a Female Physical Youth Culture at the University of Waikato in 2007. Thorpe then joined the faculty of the university, rising to full professor in 2019. Her inaugural professorial lecture described how new sports like snowboarding came to be included in the Olympic Games. Her research covers gender, youth, extreme and action sports and how sport can contribute to development.

Thorpe is a principal investigator in the Te Pūnaha Matatini Centre of Research Excellence. She has written five books and edited a further nine. Thorpe is a founding member of WHISPA, a High Performance Sport NZ working group on healthy women in sport.

== Awards ==
In 2009 Thorpe was awarded a scholarship by the Leverhulme Trust to visit the University of Brighton, where she wrote a book about snowboarding culture.

Thorpe was awarded a Fulbright Scholarship in 2011 to visit Georgetown University to compare the extreme sport experiences of New Zealand and American children and youth. and a Leverhulme Fellowship. In 2018 she was awarded a Royal Society Early Career Research Excellence Award for Social Sciences, and in the same year was awarded Fellowship of the North American Society for the Sociology of Sport.

Thorpe was awarded a James Cook Research Fellowship in 2021, for research titled 'Reconceptualizing Wellbeing: Women, Sport and Communities of Belonging'. Her project explores the impact of the COVID-19 pandemic on women, and their strategies for maintaining connection, wellbeing and physical health during the pandemic.

== Selected works ==
- Holly Thorpe (2009). "Bourdieu, Feminism and Female Physical Culture: Gender Reflexivity and the Habitus-Field Complex". Sociology of Sport Journal. 26 (4): 491–516. doi:10.1123/ssj.26.4.491. Wikidata Q123411046.
- Holly Thorpe (2008). "Foucault, Technologies of Self, and the Media: Discourses of Femininity in Snowboarding Culture". Journal of Sport & Social Issues. 32 (2): 199–229. doi:10.1177/0193723508315206. Wikidata Q123411051.
- Holly Thorpe; Belinda Wheaton (2011). "'Generation X Games', Action Sports and the Olympic Movement: Understanding the Cultural Politics of Incorporation". Sociology. 45 (5): 830–847. doi:10.1177/0038038511413427. Wikidata Q123411054.
- Kim Toffoletti; Holly Thorpe (2018). "Female athletes' self-representation on social media: A feminist analysis of neoliberal marketing strategies in "economies of visibility"". Feminism & Psychology. 28 (1): 11–31. doi:10.1177/0959353517726705. Wikidata Q123411005.
- Holly Thorpe; Nida Ahmad (2013). "Youth, action sports and political agency in the Middle East: Lessons from a grassroots parkour group in Gaza". International Review for the Sociology of Sport. 50 (6): 678–704. doi:10.1177/1012690213490521. Wikidata Q123411058.
- Thorpe, Holly (27 October 2022). "New Zealand's slippery slopes: the uncertain future of snow sports in a climate emergency". Alaska Beacon.
