= Grace Moore (rugby union) =

Ireland international rugby union player

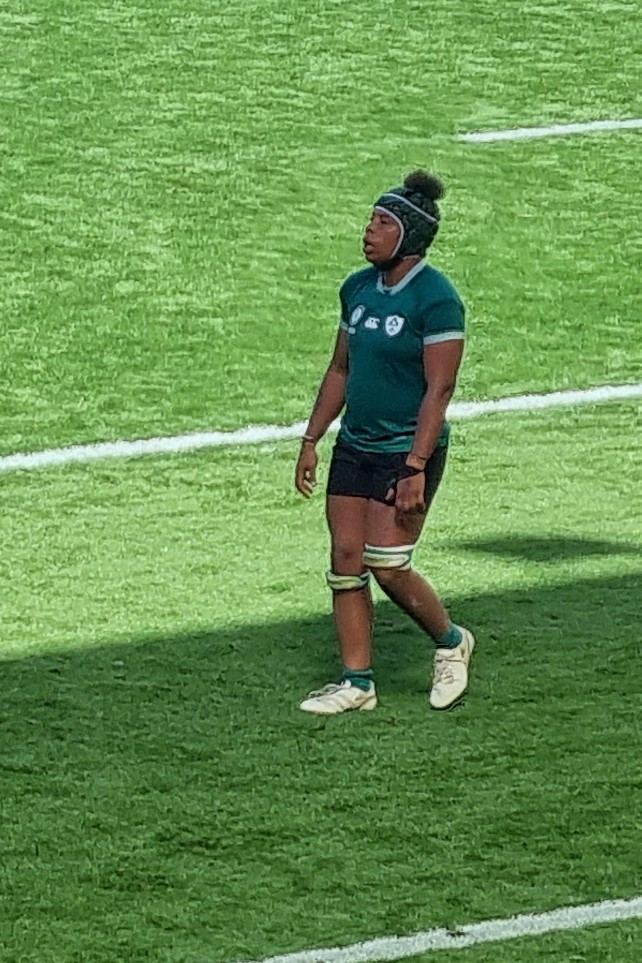
- 2025 Rugby World Cup in Northampton
- Born: 21 May 1996 (age 30) London, England
- Height: 172 cm (5 ft 8 in)
- Weight: 73 kg (161 lb; 11 st 7 lb)

Rugby union career
Amateur team(s)
Years	Team	Apps	(Points)
2016–2019	Streatham-Croydon RFC		(0)
Senior career
Years	Team	Apps	(Points)
2018–2019	Richmond		
2020–2022	Railway Union		
2022–2024	Saracens		
2024–2026	Ealing Trailfinders		
2026–	Munster Rugby		
International career
Years	Team	Apps	(Points)
2021–	Ireland	26	(25)
- Correct as of 24 September 2025
National sevens team
Years	Team		Comps
2020	Ireland 7s		

Grace Moore (born 21 May 1996) is an Irish rugby player from London, England. She plays for Ealing Trailfinders and the Ireland women's national rugby union team.

== Club career ==
London-born Moore's first club was Streatham-Croydon R.F.C. and she concentrated on rugby with them in 2018, her last year in university. She joined Premier 15s side Richmond Women a year later. She was a winger when she started but finished the season in their back row. She joined All-Ireland League side Railway Union in Dublin in 2020.

Moore signed with Saracens ahead of the 2022–23 Premier 15s season. She later joined Ealing Trailfinders for the 2024–25 Premiership Women's Rugby season.

== International career ==
Moore's potential to play for Ireland was identified by Steven McGinnis through Irish Rugby Union's IQ (Irish Qualified) Programme. Her talent was developed through the Ireland women's national rugby sevens programme and she made her debut in the Dubai Sevens in December 2019.

With international sevens in a hiatus in due to the global pandemic in 2020 she was selected to train with Ireland women's national rugby union team in the winter of 2020.

She was one of five new Sevens players introduced to the Irish squad for the 2021 Women's Six Nations. She made her 2021 Women's Six Nations debut, as a replacement, in the third/fourth place playoff against Italy.

She was selected for the Ireland women's national rugby sevens team for the 2021–2022 season.

She was selected in the Ireland squad to compete at the WXV1 tournament in Canada in September 2024.

She was named in Ireland's fifteens side for the 2025 Six Nations Championship in March. On 11 August 2025, she made the Irish squad to the Rugby World Cup in England.

== Personal life ==
Moore played netball and volleyball to a high level before switching to rugby. She was a primary school PE teacher in England before being contracted to the Irish Rugby Union Sevens programme in 2020. She is training to be a physical trainer at Setanta College.
