= Sophie Bridger =

England international rugby union player

- Born: 26 June 2000 (age 26)
- Height: 169 cm (5 ft 7 in)
- Weight: 75 kg (11 st 11 lb)
- University: Hartpury College

Rugby union career
- Position(s): Centre, Fly-half
- Current team: Saracens Women
Senior career
Years	Team	Apps	(Points)
2021–2023	Gloucester-Hartpury	–	(–)
2023–	Saracens Women	–	(–)
International career
Years	Team	Apps	(Points)
2023–	England	2	(0)

Sophie Bridger (born 26 June 2000) is an English rugby union player who currently plays as a centre and fly-half for Saracens Women in the Premiership Women's Rugby, the top-tier competition of women's rugby union in England, and for England national team.

== Early life and education ==
Bridger began playing rugby at a young age with her three older brothers, before moving to Gloucestershire when she was 15 years old, to attend Hartpury College. At university, she earned a bachelor's degree and a master's degree in exercise and sports science.

After progressing through in the AASE Girls Rugby Programme, Bridger represented Hartpury University in BUCS Super Rugby – the top-flight university rugby league in the United Kingdom – between 2018 and 2022. She missed two seasons due to injury, but upon her return, she was appointed captain of the university's first XV, under the tutelage of her head coach and future teammate, the Gloucester-Hartpury and England scrum-half Natasha Hunt. Bridger led Hartpury to the BUCS National Championship in 2022, and her performances were recognised during the annual BUCS Rugby Awards, where she was named in the 2022 Team of the Season at fly-half.

== Club career ==
Upon graduation from university, Bridger was signed by Gloucester-Hartpury for the 2022–23 Premier 15s season. She balanced her rugby career while also working as a response officer for Gloucestershire County Council. Playing primarily as a centre, she enjoyed a breakthrough debut season, which culminated in winning the Premier 15s title, as she came off the bench to help her team defeat Exeter Chiefs by 34–19 in the final on 24 June 2023.

Ahead of the 2023–24 Premiership Women's Rugby season, it was announced that Bridger had joined Saracens.

== International career ==
Bridger received her first call-up to the England senior training squad from head coach Simon Middleton, during the 2023 Women's Six Nations Championship, although she remained uncapped. She was called up again by interim head coach Louis Deacon that autumn, for England's warm-up tests ahead of the WXV 2023 tournament.

On 30 September 2023, Bridger made her international debut, as a replacement in England's 29–12 victory over Canada at the StoneX Stadium.
