= Darlington Mowden Park Sharks =

- Full name: Darlington Mowden Park Sharks Ladies Rugby Football Club
- Union: Durham County Rugby Football Union
- Nickname: Sharks
- Founded: 1994; 32 years ago (as Ripon Ladies); 2002; 24 years ago (as Thirsk Sharks); 2006; 20 years ago (as Darlington Mowden Park Sharks)
- Ground: The Darlington Arena
- Most tries: Louisa Ramsey (42)
- League: Premier 15s
- 2022–23: 9th

Official website
- www.mowdenpark.com/teams/196169

Darlington Mowden Park Sharks Ladies Rugby Football Club (commonly shortened to DMP Sharks) is a women's rugby union club in Darlington, County Durham, England founded in 1994 as Ripon Ladies RUFC.

They are the ladies team of Darlington Mowden Park R.F.C. and played in the Allianz Premier 15s until 2023. They play their home games at The Darlington Arena.

== History ==
=== Ripon Ladies (1994-2002) ===
The club was founded in 1994 in Ripon as Ripon Ladies RUFC.

After an impressive start after their entry into the Rugby Union league (including three promotions in four seasons), the team needed to look to change their training night to build their squad sufficiently to complete and to allow training to take place for those who played university matches or had regional training. A failure to resolve this issue saw a temporarily proposed resolution of playing at Thirsk, become permanent and the club left Ripon at the end of the 2001–2002 season.

Alongside this the rise of the team had also created financial pressures, with the club initially being funded by fundraising. A kit sponsorship deal was announced in 2001, which saw the team put on a stronger financial footing.

=== Thirsk Sharks (2002-2006) ===
The club moved to Thirsk, North Yorkshire, in 2002 where it was known as Thirsk Sharks RFC.

During this period the club were felt to be "the premier women's rugby team in the North" and during 2003 no less than eleven Thirsk players were called up to join England squads. One player joined the main England women's team, five players joined the academy squad and a further five were called up to join the Under-19s squad. Also in 2003 the team secured a major sponsorship deal with specialist vehicle manufacturer; Multidrive.

By the following year, the team had launched a development squad and by 2005 the team particularly benefitted from a £12,000 grant for new floodlights at The Athletic Ground.

=== Darlington Mowden Park Sharks (2006 Onwards) ===
The club then moved to Darlington in 2006 and became affiliated to Darlington Mowden Park and changed its name accordingly. In 2009, Darlington Mowden Park Sharks were promoted from Championship 1 North to the Women's Premiership after finishing top of the table. They then defeated Championship 1 South team, Bath Rugby Ladies in extra time in the playoffs in order to be promoted.

In 2020, as part of the league re-tender process and formal agreements were confirmed, they changed their name to Darlington Mowden Park Durham Sharks to reflect their enhanced partnership with Durham University, and also played their home games for the latter part of the 2020/21 Allianz Premier 15s season (from February 2021) at Durham's Maiden Castle ground. In 2022 the club reverted to its previous name of Darlington Mowden Park Sharks.

In 2022, crowd-funding raised £50,000, which enabled the club to compete in the 2022/23 Allianz Premier 15s season. The 2022/23 season was the club's last in the Allianz Premier 15s, with the club deciding not to bid for membership in the 2023/24 season as it was felt that "the significant financial commitment required was unsustainable in both the short and long term, particularly for a community rugby club". The club was accepted into Championship North for the 2023/24 season but withdrew in August 2023 due to a lack of players, with the stated intention of re-entering the league system in the 2024/25 season.

== Stadium ==
Darlingon Mowden Park Sharks play at The Darlington Arena, a 25,000-seat stadium in the town. The stadium is now called the Northern Echo Arena due to a sponsorship deal with the Northern Echo news and media company.

Prior to 2012, Darlingon Mowden Park Sharks used to play their home matches at Yiewsley Drive, until Darlington Mowden Park purchased The Darlington Arena after its previous tenants, association football club Darlington F.C., went out of business and its phoenix club, Darlington 1883 F.C. decided to play its home games outside Darlington. They started playing at The Darlington Arena in the 2013–14 season, alongside Darlington Mowden Park's men's team as well as their mini and junior teams.

As Ripon Ladies, the team played at Mallorie Park, Ripon.

As Thirsk Sharks, the team plated at The Athletic Ground, Thirsk.

== Notable players ==
England internationals

- Zoe Aldcroft
- Jo Brown
- Katy Daley-McLean
- Ursula Hardy
- Heather Kerr
- Ruth Laybourn
- Claudia MacDonald
- La Toya Mason
- Georgina Roberts
- Abbie Scott
- Tamara Taylor
- Lauren Torley (7s)

Ireland international

- Jo Brown
- Sophie Spence

Scotland internationals

- Beth Blacklock
- Lisa Cockburn
- Abi Evans (15s and 7s)
- Sarah Law
- Katy Green
- Elis Martin
- Lisa Martin
- Caity Mattinson
- Rachel McLachlan
- Liz Musgrove
- Louisa Ramsey (top try scorer (42 tries in 68 appearances), became the first player to score over 10 tries for Scotland)
- Lana Skeldon
- Lisa Thomson
- Evie Tonkin
- Lucy Winter

France international

- Maelle Picut

United States internationals

- Meya Bizer
- Rachel Ehrecke
- Tess Feury
- Olivia Ortiz
- Kathryn Treder

== Season summaries ==
	League			
Season	Competition	Final position	Points	Play-offs
1998–99	Women's North Division 3	1st		Promoted to Women's North Division 2
1999–00	Women's North Division 2	3rd		
2000–01	Women's North Division 2	1st	(Note: Ripon were unbeaten in this campaign)	Promoted to Women's North Division 1
2001–02	Women's North Division 1	1st	20	Promoted to Women's Premiership 2
2002–03	Women's Premiership 2	2nd	14	Promoted to Women's Premiership 1 (Note: Ripon was promoted as the winners; Wasps II, being a second team, could not be promoted)
2003–04	Women's Premiership 1	6th	13	
2004–05	Women's Premiership 1	7th	13	
2005–06	Women's Premiership 1	8th	11	Relegated to Women's Premiership 2
2006–07	Women's Premiership 2	2nd	59	
2007–08	Women's Championship 1	1st	61	(Note: Women's Premiership 2 rebranded as Women's Championship 1 for 2007–08 season) (Note: No promotion to Women's Premiership in this season)
2008–09	Women's Championship 1	1st	41	Promoted to Women's Premiership
2009–10	Women's Premiership	3rd	35	
2010–11	Women's Premiership	6th	28	
2011–12	Women's Premiership	7th	26	
2012–13	Women's Premiership	7th	10	
2013–14	Women's Premiership	5th	31	
2014–15	Women's Premiership	7th	23	
2015–16	Women's Premiership	7th	10	
2016–17	Women's Premiership	8th	12	
2017–18	Tyrrells Premier 15s	8th	26	
2018–19	Tyrrells Premier 15s	8th	18	
2019–20	Tyrrells Premier 15s	6th	24	Season annulled
2020–21	Allianz Premier 15s	10th	5	
2021–22	Allianz Premier 15s	10th	0	
2022–23	Allianz Premier 15s	9th	10	Not included in Premiership Women's Rugby (Note: DMP Sharks did not apply for inclusion in The PWR due to financial investment requirements)
2023–24	Women's Championship North 1	-	-	Withdrew before start of season

Gold background denotes champions
Silver background denotes runners-up
Pink background denotes relegated
