= Lauren Delany =

- Born: 17 July 1989 (age 37) Dublin, Ireland
- Height: 1.75 m (5 ft 9 in)
- Weight: 73 kg (161 lb; 11 st 7 lb)

Rugby union career
- Position: Wing/Full-back
Amateur team(s)
Years	Team	Apps	(Points)
2014-2015	Bletchley Ladies RFC		
Senior career
Years	Team	Apps	(Points)
2015-2020	Waterloo Ladies		
2020-2025	Sale Sharks		
International career
Years	Team	Apps	(Points)
2018–2024	Ireland	26	(10)
National sevens team
Years	Team		Comps
- Ireland 7s

Lauren Delany (born 17 June 1989) is a former Irish rugby player from Shankill, Dublin. She played for Sale Sharks and the Ireland women's national rugby union team. She works as a sports nutritionist.

== Club career ==
Delany represented Ireland at basketball and only took up rugby at age 25, when she moved to England to do a master's degree. Her first club was Bletchley Ladies, then she moved to Waterloo Ladies who play in England's Premier 15s.

In August 2020 she joined Sale Sharks. In March 2025, Delany announced her retirement from the sport, while remaining with Sale's nutrition team across men's and women's programmes.

== International career ==
Delany was recruited by the Irish Rugby Football Union IQrugby (Irish-qualified) system which identifies talent outside of Ireland. Ireland manager Adam Griggs saw her first playing in an IQrugby trial in England in 2018.

In 2018 she made her debut for the Ireland women's national rugby union team in an Autumn international v USA rugby. She made her Women's Six Nations debut, at full-back, against England in 2019 and was Ireland's starting full-back for every game of the 2019 Women's Six Nations.

Moved to the wing in 2020, she scored her first Six Nations try, against Wales, in the 2020 Women's Six Nations.

She played on the right wing for Ireland in the 2021 Women's Six Nations.

== Personal life ==
Delany went to school in Colaiste Iosagain in Dublin, an all-girls school where the main sports were basketball and ladies gaelic football. She competed in the Basketball Ireland Women's Superleague with Meteors Basketball Club and played for Ireland up to U23 level, including the European U16 Championships (2005).

She has a degree in human nutrition and dietetics from Trinity College Dublin, a post-grad from Dublin Institute of Technology, a Masters in Science (Sport and Exercise Nutrition) from Loughborough University in England and is studying for a PhD at Leeds Beckett University.

She lives in Manchester. Her work, with the English Institute of Sport, has seen her advising several of British sport's high performance units and Olympic sports (cycling, badminton, archery, taekwondo and swimming) and she also advises the Leeds Rhinos on performance nutrition.
