= Elizabeth Lee Wheaton =

American educator and novelist

Elizabeth Lee Wheaton (née Fulton; 26 May 1902 – 14 December 1982) was an American educator and novelist.

== Mr. George's Joint ==
Wheaton's first novel, Mr. George's Joint, was a decorated and controversial novel depicting African-American life in the American South. The award citation when the novel won the 1941 Thomas Jefferson Southern Award for the best book manuscript by a Southern author said the novel had "artistic truth and rich human appeal" unusual in its depiction of African-American life compared to other fictions which present African-Americans as "quaint and sentimental" or "falsified ... for purposes of social reform."

The novel garnered as much criticism as acclaim. Lewis Gannett called its characters "black apes ... consistently subhuman."
