= Cliodhna Moloney =

Irish rugby union player

Cliodhna Moloney-MacDonald
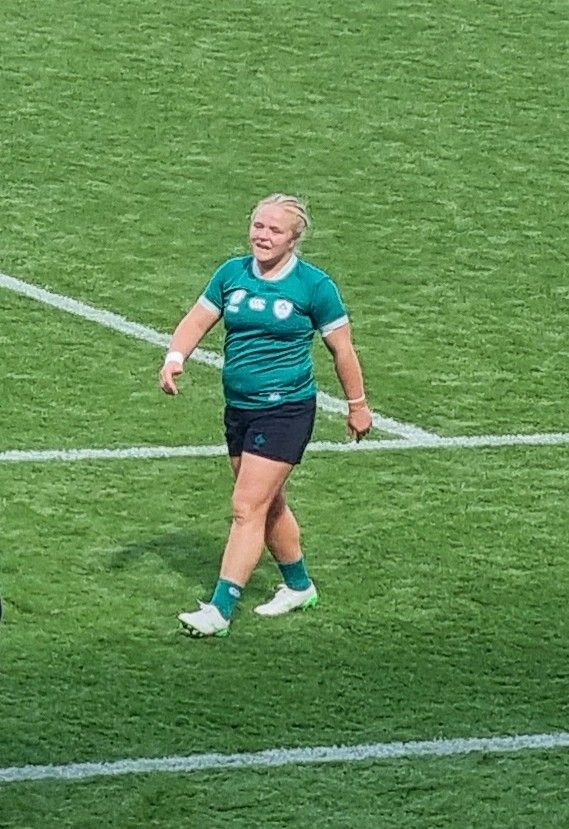
- Clíodhna Moloney at 2025 Rugby World Cup in Northampton
- Born: Clíodhna Moloney; 31 May 1993 (age 33) Kilconly, Ireland
- Height: 1.68 m (5 ft 6 in)
- Weight: 80 kg (176 lb)
- Occupation: Banker

Rugby union career
- Position: Hooker
- Current team: Exeter Chiefs
Senior career
Years	Team	Apps	(Points)
2014–2018	Railway Union RFC		(0)
2018–2022	Wasps		(0)
2022–	Exeter Chiefs	49	(120)
Provincial / State sides
Years	Team	Apps	(Points)
2014–	Leinster		
International career
Years	Team	Apps	(Points)
2015–	Ireland	49	(40)
- Correct as of 24 September 2025

Cliodhna Moloney-MacDonald (née Moloney, born 31 May 1993) is an Irish women's rugby union player from Kilconly, County Galway, Ireland. She currently plays for Exeter Chiefs and the Ireland women's national rugby union team as a hooker.

== Career ==
Prior to playing rugby, Moloney had played Gaelic football at youth level. She played for Corofin and was a part of the Galway GAA team that played in the All-Ireland Football Championships. Moloney started playing rugby while studying for a degree in sport with business at the Institute of Technology, Sligo despite working as a Gaelic football coach for Sligo GAA through the Institute of Technology. She had been invited by a Dublin friend of hers to join one of their training sessions. From this, she joined Dublin based Railway Union RFC in 2014.

After Ireland's disappointing form in the 2017 Women's Rugby World Cup she joined Wasps in 2018 to play in the Premier 15s. She missed most of her first season in England due to shoulder surgery.

=== International career ===
Moloney made her international debut for Ireland in 2015 against the England women's national rugby union team at The Stoop in London. Afterwards she was selected to play for Ireland in the 2015 Women's Six Nations Championship. Following this, she led calls for the Women's Six Nations Championship to share stadiums with the men's Six Nations Championship after playing a match against England at Twickenham Stadium. In 2017, she was a part of Ireland's 2017 Women's Rugby World Cup campaign hosted in Ireland. She was a part of promotion for the tournament at University College Dublin, where the group games of the Women's Rugby World Cup were to be held at the UCD Bowl.

Moloney missed the 2019 International season due to shoulder surgery. In 2020 she was Player of the Match in the 2020 Women's Six Nations game against Wales and ended the season as Rugby Players Ireland 2020 Women's Player of the Year.

In February 2021 she was selected on the Irish Women's Team of the Decade by the Front Row Union website. She was Ireland's first-choice hooker for the 2021 Women's Six Nations Championship.

She was named in Ireland's XVs side for the 2025 Six Nations Championship in March. On 11 August 2025, she made the Irish squad to the Rugby World Cup.

== Personal life ==
Moloney is one of seven children from a farming background. She went to secondary school in St Brigid's Tuam and to college at Institute of Technology Sligo. She works as a banker, previously for KBC Bank Ireland and now as a compliance analyst for Metro Bank.

In 2025, Maloney married her Exeter teammate and England international Claudia MacDonald.
