= Lisa Martin (rugby union) =

Scottish rugby union player

- Born: 31 March 1990 (age 36) Duddingston, Scotland
- Height: 1.65 m (5 ft 5 in)

Rugby union career
- Positions: Fly-half; Inside centre
- Current team: Saracens Women
Senior career
Years	Team	Apps	(Points)
?–2017	Murrayfield Wanderers	?	(?)
2017–2018	DMP Sharks	?	(?)
2018–2019	Lille Métropole	?	(?)
2019–2021	Saracens Women	?	(?)
2021	Heriot's Rugby Club	?	(?)
2021-present	Saracens Women	?	(?)
- Correct as of 27 February 2021
International career
Years	Team	Apps	(Points)
2010–	Scotland	50+	(?)
- Correct as of 27 February 2021

Lisa Martin (born 31 March 1990) is a Scottish rugby union player, who captained the national side from 2016 to 2018. She has made at least 50 appearances for Scotland. At club level, Martin plays for Saracens Women.

== Club career ==
Martin started playing rugby in Edinburgh at the age of 7. As a youngstar, she also played basketball, and competed for East Scotland in the under-16 Scotland Schools Cup. Martin plays as either a fly-half or inside centre.

Martin played for Scottish club Murrayfield Wanderers, and captained the team in 2014, when they won the Sarah Beany Cup, and in 2015, when they won the inaugural Donna Kennedy Cup. In 2017, Martin moved to English club Darlington Mowden Park Sharks. Ahead of the 2018–19 French women's Premier Division season, Martin moved to French club Lille Métropole Rugby Club Villeneuvois (LMRCV). It was her first fully professional contract, and allowed her to play rugby full-time. Ahead of the 2019–20 Premier 15s season, Martin signed for English club Saracens Women. In the 2021–2022 season, she played for Heriot's Rugby Club.

== International career ==
Martin made her international debut for Scotland in 2010, during the 2010 Women's Rugby World Cup. She made her first start in a 2011 match against Spain. From 2016 to 2018, she was the Scotland captain, and she captained Scotland in three Six Nations Championships. Her first match as captain was the 2016 Six Nations Championship match against England. She missed one game of the 2018 Six Nations Championship with an eye injury. Later in the tournament, she captained Scotland to their first away win against Ireland in 12 years. In 2018, Martin was one of eight players to receive a "2021 contract" from the Scottish Rugby Union. The contract provided financial support until the 2021 Rugby World Cup.

Martin has made over 50 appearances for Scotland. She has also played rugby sevens, and was part of the Scotland team that won the 2018 Amsterdam 7s event.

== Personal life ==
Martin is from Duddingston, Scotland. She attended Portobello High School. Aside from rugby, Martin worked as a performance coach at the University of Edinburgh; she left the role when she joined LMRCV. She has also worked as a volunteer teaching assistant at Saracens High School. Martin is in a long-term relationship with Calum Gauld, who is a coach for Murrayfield Wanderers men's team. Her father also played rugby union whilst in the Royal Air Force.
