= Claudia MacDonald =

English rugby union player

Claudia Moloney-MacDonald
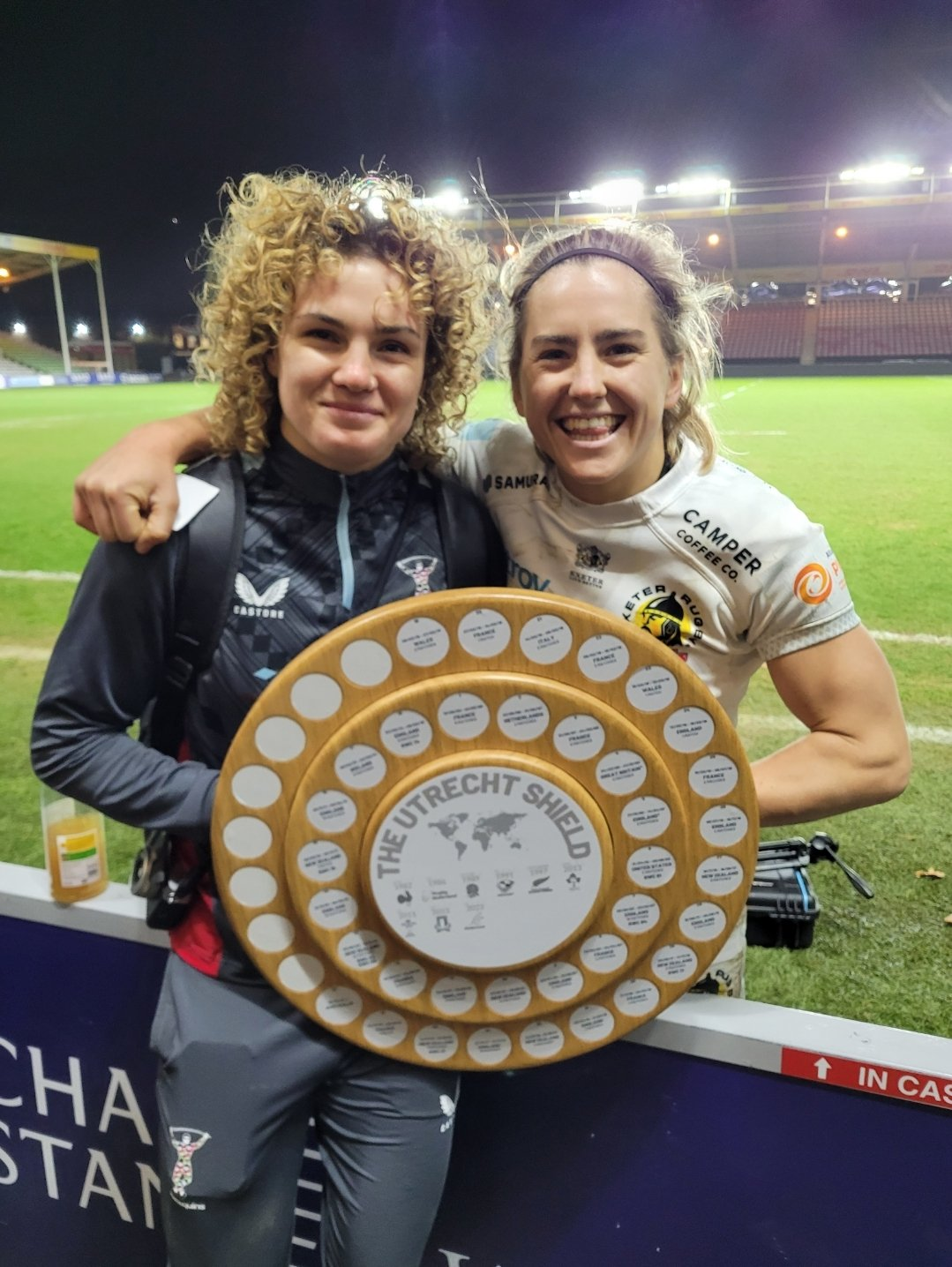
- Ellie Kildunne and Claudia Moloney-MacDonald with the Utrecht Shield
- Born: Claudia Frances MacDonald; 4 January 1996 (age 30) Epsom, Surrey, England
- Height: 1.67 m (5 ft 6 in)
- Weight: 66 kg (146 lb)

Rugby union career
- Position: Scrum-half / Wing
- Current team: Exeter Chiefs Women
Amateur team(s)
Years	Team	Apps	(Points)
- Durham University
–	Sutton & Epsom RFC		
Senior career
Years	Team	Apps	(Points)
2017–2018	DMP Sharks		
2018–2022	Wasps	39	(135)
2022–	Exeter Chiefs	21	(95)
International career
Years	Team	Apps	(Points)
2018–	England	48	(105)
Medal record
Representing England
Women's rugby union
Rugby World Cup
Gold medal – first place	2025 England	Team competition
Silver medal – second place	2021 New Zealand	Team competition

Claudia Frances Moloney-MacDonald (née MacDonald, born 4 January 1996) is an English rugby union scrum-half and winger who plays for the England national team and club rugby for Exeter Chiefs Women.

== International career ==
MacDonald made her debut for the England national team coming off the bench against the United States in the 2018 Quilter Internationals.

She played against Wales in the 2019 Women's Six Nations Championship, which England won with a grand slam.

In January 2019, MacDonald was awarded a professional contract with the national team. Later that year, she scored a try in England's Super Series fixture versus the USA. She went on to play 80 minutes in England's victory over Italy in November 2019.

MacDonald was a member of the 2020 Women's Six Nations England squad. She was named in the England squad for the delayed 2021 Rugby World Cup held in New Zealand in October and November 2022.

On 17 March 2025, she was called into the Red Roses side for the Six Nations Championship. She was named in England's squad for the 2025 Women's Rugby World Cup.

== Club career ==
MacDonald played for Sutton & Epsom RFC before joining the Tyrrells Premier 15s side Darlington Mowden Park Sharks in September 2017. In 2018, she moved to Wasps Ladies. In 2022, she started playing for Exeter Chiefs Women.

== Early life, education and personal life ==
MacDonald was born in Epsom, Surrey, but her family moved to Dubai in 2008. They spent four years in the Gulf, where her brother Alex represented the Arabian Gulf side. Her second brother, Seb, also played rugby at the Swiegi Overseas Rugby Club in Malta.

Previously a netballer, MacDonald did not start playing rugby until she was 19, but quickly went on to captain her university team at Durham University, where she was studying for a degree in economics.

MacDonald was educated privately at St John's School, Leatherhead in Surrey.

She runs a blog, 'Let's Talk 1%', focusing on reducing environmental impact and climate emergency activism. She is also a PADI-qualified rescue scuba diver.

In 2025 MacDonald married Irish international and Exeter teammate Cliodhna Moloney. She is now referred to as Claudia Moloney-MacDonald.

== Honours ==
England

- Women's Rugby World Cup
  - (gold) Champion (1): 2025
