= Flo Long =

English rugby union player

- Born: Bristol, England

Rugby union career
- Position: Prop
- Current team: Worcester Warriors Women
Amateur team(s)
Years	Team	Apps	(Points)
- Somerset U18s
Senior career
Years	Team	Apps	(Points)
- Bristol Bears
2020–	Worcester Warriors		
International career
Years	Team	Apps	(Points)
- England U20s

Florence Long is an English rugby union player. She plays for Worcester Warriors Women at club level and was a member of the England squad for the 2021 Women's Six Nations Championships.

== International career ==
Long was named to the England squad for the 2021 Women's Six Nations Championships as one of six development players in March 2021, having previously played for the country's U20 side.

== Club career ==
Long currently plays for Worcester Warriors Women, having joined from Bristol Bears in 2020. In 2022, she was on short term loan to Saracens.

== Early life and education ==
Born in Bristol, Long played for Somerset RFU at U18 level. She supported her mother, who had breast cancer.
