= Georgina Roberts =

England international rugby union footballer

- Born: 9 July 1984 (age 42) Bradford, West Yorkshire, England
- Height: 1.62 m (5 ft 4 in)
- Weight: 61 kg (134 lb)

Rugby union career
- Position: Centre
International career
Years	Team	Apps	(Points)
2008–????	England	14	(15)

Georgina Elizabeth Anne Roberts (born 9 July 1984 in Bradford, West Yorkshire) is a member of the England women's rugby union squad. Roberts was educated at Beckfoot School, and started playing rugby at the University of Bath after she missed a flight to a skeleton bobsleigh competition in the Netherlands at the age of 19. Her main squad is the Darlington Mowden Park Sharks, her position is centre, her height is 1.62 m, she is 61 kg and has 14 caps.

Her nickname is Toad.
