= Sarah Law =

- Born: 19 December 1994 (age 31) Edinburgh, Scotland
- Height: 1.64 m (5 ft 4 1/2 in)
- Weight: 74 kg (163 lb; 11 st 9 lb)

Rugby union career
- Position(s): Scrum-Half, Fly-Half
International career
Years	Team	Apps	(Points)
2013–2022	Scotland	53	(63)
2024	Barbarians		

Sarah Law (born 19 December 1994) is a former Scottish rugby player from Penicuik, near Edinburgh. She played for Scotland and represented them over fifty times internationally, including at the 2021 Women's Six Nations Championship. Law was the fourth Scottish woman to receive a professional rugby contract from Scotland. She kicked the match-winning penalty in the win against Wales in the 2017 Women's Six Nations Championship to beat the opposing team for the first time in seven years. She repeated the feat under even more pressurised circumstances in 2021 when her 82nd minute conversion of a Chloe Rollie try put Scotland through to the qualification final for the Rugby World Cup at the expense of their opponents Ireland.

== Club career ==
Law started playing rugby at Penicuik Rugby Club aged five, playing in the mixed mini side throughout her primary school years until she moved to secondary school, aged 11. At that point, she moved on to the Murrayfield Wanderers girls U15/U18 team. She was a scrum half for both the University team and Murrayfield Wanderers. She began playing for Wanderers' senior team in January 2012, as she had just turned 17, and helped them win the league and cup double that season.

Law played in numerous schools' cup finals and, in 2012, scored 32 points and picked up Player of the Match as Wanderers beat Plockton HS to the Brewin Dolphin Scottish Schools Shield.

She captained the winning 2017 University of Edinburgh team that played in The British Universities and Colleges Sport (BUCS) Championship, defeating Northumbria at Twickenham 48-5.

In 2019, Sarah signed for Darlington Mowden Park Sharks, playing alongside Scottish team mate Lisa Thomson.

== International career ==
Law first played for Scotland 7s in June 2012. Her international 15-a-side debut took place in the England v Scotland match of 2013 in Esher against England in the Women's Six Nations opener and she scored her first points, a conversion, against Sweden in the eleven-try FIRA victory in Madrid in April 2013. She played scrum half for the early part of her career, but moved to stand-off in 2019.

In 2017, she played in the match that saw Scotland's Women's team triumph for the first time in seven years in a game against Wales, which saw them secure a 15-14 victory, coming back from being 14-0 down. Her role was described by the Women's Six Nations as "pivotal" to the revival of Scotland's Women's team, as she kicked the match-winning penalty in the game's closing minutes.

Law attributes some of her progress in Scottish Women's rugby to the influence of coach Shade Munro, who began coaching the team in 2016. In 2017, Law was the fourth Scottish woman to receive a professional rugby contract from Scotland. She also earned professional contracts in 2018 and 2020. However, she was out of action for 11 months following the 2018 Six Women's Nations Championship, during which she tore her Achilles tendon.

In 2021 due to injury, Law did not receive one of the eight Scotland Rugby contracts, but received funding support from BT Sport Scottish Rugby Academy. She earned her 40th cap during a 2019 tour to South Africa.

The Championship marked her ninth successive year as part of Scotland’s Six Nations squad, although the team's match against Italy was her first game of any kind for 432 days due to COVID restrictions and a torn Achilles injury. Scotland coach Bryan Easson brought her in at stand-off for the Women’s Six Nations match against Italy, comparing her strategic approach to a chess player: "She moves the pawns around the pitch well and what I mean is that she is a 10 in the women’s game who can think two or three phases ahead rather than phase by phase."

In her international rugby career, she has made 33 starts and 20 appearances as a replacement, scoring 2 tries, 16 conversions and 6 penalty goals. Her last international game was against Australia in the 2021 Rugby World Cup (played in 2022) at the Northland Events Centre, Whangarei, New Zealand

In May 2024, Law announced her retirement from high-performance rugby.

In September 2024, Law came briefly out of retirement to play for the Barbarians invitational team against South Africa in Cape Town., becoming the first player from Penicuik Rugby Club to achieve that honour.

== Personal life ==
Sarah Megan Law attended Penicuik High School, where she was head girl. She studied Applied Mathematics at Edinburgh University, before undertaking a part-time Masters in Operational Research with Data Science.

Her father played scrum half at their local club in Penicuik, which is where she picked up the game. Her younger sister Rachel also played for Scotland U20 and has been involved in the extended Scotland squad for a number of years.

Outside of her rugby career, Law worked as a Data Analyst at the University of Edinburgh and is a qualified Operational Research Analyst.

== Honours ==
- 2016-17, Alex Currie Award (most inspirational performance of the year), Edinburgh University Sports Union
- 2015-16, Executive Committee Award (major services to club/university sport), Edinburgh University Sports Union
- 2013-14, Top Sports Woman Award, Edinburgh University Sports Union
