= Frank H. Wheaton Sr. =

President of Wheaton Industries (1881-1983)

Frank Hayes Wheaton Sr. (March 16, 1881 – April 1983) was president of Wheaton Industries from 1926 to 1966 and chairman of the board from 1931 until his death. He is one of a handful of centenarians to chair corporate boards, and was the subject of a front-page article in The Wall Street Journal shortly before his 100th birthday; it was titled, At 99, the Chairman Still Doesn't Hanker for a Life of Retirement.

Residents of Millville, New Jersey turned out for a parade in 1981 to honor Wheaton on the occasion of his 100th birthday.
