= Anne Williams Wheaton =

Anne Williams Wheaton (September 11, 1892 – March 23, 1977) was an American publicist.

She was born in Utica, New York and attended Simmons College in Boston, Massachusetts. After her graduation in 1912, Wheaton went to work for the Albany Knickerbocker Press where she copied recipes. She continued in their employ until 1921.

From 1924 to 1939, Wheaton was public relations director for several national women's organizations. She also served as director of the League of Women Voters for six years.

From 1939 to 1957, Wheaton served as assistant to the director of Publicity for the Republican National Committee. In 1940, 1944, 1948, and 1952, she served as publicly representative for the wives of Republican presidential candidates. In 1952, she served as press representative for Mamie Eisenhower.

On May 2, 1957, in President Dwight D. Eisenhower's office, Wheaton was sworn in as Associate Press Secretary at the White House. She was the first woman to hold that post. Following Eisenhower's November 1957 stroke, Wheaton was left to speak to the press without much knowledge of the president's medical condition.

She died in Dallas, Texas on March 23, 1977.
