= International Review for the Sociology of Sport =

- Discipline: Cultural Studies
- Language: English
- Edited by: Lawrence Wenner

Publication details
- History: 1966 - present
- Publisher: SAGE Publications
- Frequency: Bimonthly
- Impact factor: 1.341 (2015)

Standard abbreviations
- ISO 4: Int. Rev. Sociol. Sport

Indexing
- ISSN: 1012-6902 (print); 1461-7218 (web)
- LCCN: 85646001
- OCLC no.: 609952449

Links
- Journal homepage; Online access; Online archive

International Review for the Sociology of Sport is a peer-reviewed academic journal that publishes papers in the field of Sociology. The journal is edited by Lawrence Wenner, Von der Ahe Professor of Communication & Ethics at Loyola Marymount University, who replaced John Sugden (University of Brighton) in 2012. Dominic Malcolm took over as editor in 2018. It has been in publication since 1966 and is currently published by SAGE Publications in association with International Sociology of Sport Association.

== Scope ==
International Review for the Sociology of Sport solely focuses on the global dissemination of research on sport within Sociology, sport studies, anthropology, cultural studies and across the social sciences. The interdisciplinary journal publishes standard research papers, research notes and book reviews in the field and is not restricted to a theoretical or methodological perspective.

== Abstracting and indexing ==
International Review for the Sociology of Sport is abstracted and indexed in, among other databases: SCOPUS, and the Social Sciences Citation Index. According to the Journal Citation Reports, its 2015 impact factor was 1.341, ranking it 41 out of 142 journals in the category 'Sociology' and 18 out of 44 journals in the category 'Hospitality, Leisure, Sport & Tourism'.
