= Jodie Rettie =

- Born: 31 December 1990 (age 35) Great Yarmouth, England
- Height: 1.73 m (5 ft 8 in)
- Weight: 71 kg (157 lb; 11 st 3 lb)

Rugby union career
- Position: Hooker
Senior career
Years	Team	Apps	(Points)
2018-2023	Saracens Women		
International career
Years	Team	Apps	(Points)
2018–	Scotland	18	(0)

Jodie Rettie (born 31 December 1990) is a Scottish rugby player, who played in the 2021 Women's Six Nations Championship. She has played international rugby for Scotland since 2018.

== Club career ==
In her club career, Rettie has played for Old Albanians and Thurrock RFC. Her first club was Lakenham Hewett in Norwich.

Since 2018, Rettie has played for the Premier 15 side, Saracens Women, starting as hooker and in the backrow. In 2020 the team experienced 12 wins in a row, with Rettie among the squad.

In 2019, the team won the Tyrells Premier 15s championship as they beat Harlequins 33–17, with Rettie playing in position 6.

== International career ==
Rettie received her first Scotland cap from the bench in the team's 2018 Women's Six Nations Championship opener versus Wales. She went on to play in the championship's match against France, in which the team lost 3-26 - a step change in progress since the previous year's 0–55 loss.

Rettie was among the Scottish team selected for the 2021 Women's Six Nations Championship. She played in the opening match against England, in which Scotland lost 42–10, coming off the bench for the last nine minutes. She came in as a replacement in Scotland's play-off against Wales, replacing Siobhan Cattigan, helping the team to win 27–20.

She was a part of the winning English National Schools 7s squad in 2008, representing England Colleges in 2008/09, and was a part of the British Colleges East rugby team in the 2007/8 and 2008/9 seasons.

Jodie qualifies to play for Scotland through her Scottish father.

== Personal life ==
Rettie first played rugby at the age of 17, when she started college. Outside of her rugby career, she works as project support officer for the NHS. She graduated with a BSc in Sports Therapy from the University of Bedfordshire in 2013.

She states that New Zealand player Richie McCaw is her rugby inspiration and favourite player to watch.
