= Lisa Thomson =

Scottish rugby union and sevens player

- Born: 7 September 1997 (age 29) Hawick, Scotland
- Height: 169 cm (5 ft 7 in)
- Weight: 77 kg (170 lb)
- School: Hawick High School
- University: University of Edinburgh

Rugby union career
- Position: Centre
Senior career
Years	Team	Apps	(Points)
?–2024	DMP Sharks		(0)
2024–	Ealing Trailfinders		(0)
International career
Years	Team	Apps	(Points)
2016–	Scotland	75	(76)
National sevens team
Years	Team		Comps
2020–	Great Britain 7s		
Medal record
Women's rugby sevens
Representing Great Britain
European Games
Gold medal – first place	2023 Kraków–Małopolska	Team competition

Lisa Thomson (born 7 September 1997) is a Scottish rugby union player, who captained for Scotland Women in 2018–19. She plays for Scotland and was vice-captain for the 2021 Women's Six Nations Championship.

== Club career ==
Thomson rose up through the ranks playing for East of Scotland under-18s, Scotland under-18 and under-20. She was part of a team that won the Brewin Dolphin under-15 Cup in 2012 when she played for Langholm under-15s. She also played for Murrayfield Wanderers under-18s, before joining Melrose Ladies.

She was awarded the Keri Holdsworth Player of the Match when Edinburgh beat St Andrew's in the Varsity Cup in 2015.

She signed her first professional contract in 2017 with the SRU to play in France for French club Lille Metropole Rugby Club Villeneuvois (LMRCV) for the season of 2017–18, alongside fellow Scottish player Chloe Rollie. This provided significant opportunities for their progression in the sport and was the first contract of its kind for Scottish female players.

Following this, she returned to Edinburgh to finish her studies, while playing for DMP Sharks.

== International career ==
Thomson made her international debut against England at Broadwood in the 2016 Six Nations opener. She is a Scottish Rugby-supported player, who was the captain for Scotland Women for the 2018/19 season. When Scotland beat Italy in the Women's Six Nations Championship of 2017, Thomson played a key role, setting up the home side's first try for Chloe Rollie, helping the team fight back from 12–0 down to secure a 14–12 victory.

Thomson was selected to travel to South Africa with Scotland Women in their first ever tour and their first ever matches in the Southern Hemisphere in 2019, where they obtained two victories.

She is vice-captain for the 2021 Women's Six Nations Championship. The team lost to England and Italy, before beating Wales 27–20 to claim fifth place in the championship. Scotland captain of the 2021 Women's Six Nations, Rachel Malcolm, said of her teammate, “For me Lisa is probably the most well-rounded rugby player we have in our Scotland team. She leads so well in terms of organising the game and she has a brilliant rugby head and an unbelievable skillset."

She turned professional in 2016, when she was enlisted as a Stage Three player in the BT Sport Scottish Rugby Academy.

In 2022, she was captain at the 2021 Women's Rugby World Cup. and 2022 Commonwealth Games.

In June 2024, she was named in the British squad for the 2024 Paris Olympics. The team finished seventh. She was named in Scotland's squad for the 2025 Six Nations Championship. She was also selected in the Scottish side for the Women's Rugby World Cup.

== Personal life ==
A former pupil of Trinity Primary School and Hawick High School, Thomson got involved with rugby at 5-years-of-age playing for the Robbie Dyes in Hawick, and then played through primary school with Jedburgh minis. The town of Hawick is known for its community's passion for rugby and she frequently watched matches with her parents while growing up.

She played at Langholm youth sections, then a season for Murrayfield Wanderers U18s. This was followed by two seasons for Melrose Ladies at 17, playing her first senior rugby there. She moved on to play for Edinburgh University, while studying applied sports science there, before interrupting her studies to move to Lille, France for one season. She also spent time playing Association football for junior clubs but has stated in interviews that she preferred rugby as a contact sport.

She is also a community coach at Lismore RFC's youth programme, the Edinburgh Harlequins.

== Honours ==
- Keri Holdsworth Player of the Match (Edinburgh vs St Andrew's, Varsity Cup, 2015).
- Won the British Universities and Colleges Sport (BUCS) Premier North League (2017, BUCS 7s and BUCS Championship with Edinburgh University).
- Semi Final of the Top 8 in 2017 with Lille Metropole Rugby Club Villeneuvois.
- HSBC World Series Qualifiers Finalists 2019.
