= 2025 Women's Rugby World Cup Pool A =

Pool A of the 2025 Women's Rugby World Cup began on 22 August 2025. The pool includes hosts and two-time winners England, and previous champions United States. They are joined by Australia and Samoa.

== Teams ==
The draw for the pool stage took place on 17 October 2024 in London. A seeding system was used for the draw, with teams allocated a seed based on their World Rugby Women's World Rankings as of 14 October 2024. The top four teams in the rankings were placed into band 1 and prepopulated into the first position in each pool. The remaining 12 teams were drawn into bands 2, 3, and 4 based on their rankings and drawn one by one.

Pos.	Team	Band	Confederation	Method of qualification	Date of qualification	Apps.	Last	Previous best performance	World Rugby Rankings	
Pos.	Team	Band	Confederation	Method of qualification	Date of qualification	Apps.	Last	Previous best performance	14 October 2024 (Note: The rankings of 14 October 2024 were used for seeding for the draw.)	18 August 2025 (Note: The final rankings before the tournament started)
A1	England	1	Europe	Hosts + Top 4 at 2021 RWC	30 October 2022	10th	2021	Winners (1994, 2014)	1	1
A2	Australia	2	Oceania	2024 WXV 2	12 October 2024	8th	2021	3rd (2010)	5	6
A3	United States	3	North America	Pacific Four	25 May 2024	10th	2021	Winners (1991)	9	10
A4	Samoa	4	Oceania	2024 WXV 3	11 October 2024	4th	2014	9th (2002)	15	15

== Standings ==
Pos	Team	Pld	W	D	L	PF	PA	PD	TF	TA	TB	LB	Pts	
1	England (H)	3	3	0	0	208	17	+191	32	2	3	0	15	Advance to knockout stage
2	Australia	3	1	1	1	111	78	+33	17	12	2	0	8	Advance to knockout stage
3	United States	3	1	1	1	98	100	−2	16	16	2	0	8	
4	Samoa	3	0	0	3	3	225	−222	0	35	0	0	0	

Source: World Rugby
(H) Host

== Matches ==
The match schedule was confirmed by World Rugby on 22 October 2024. Pool A will host the opening match of the tournament between England and the United States.

=== England vs United States ===
22 August 2025
19:30 BST (UTC+1)

(1 BP) England	69–7	United States
Try: Kabeya 9' c Botterman 19' c Muir 33' c Kildunne (2) 35' c, 49' c Dow 43' m Cokayne 52' m Breach (2) 57' m, 65' m Atkin-Davies (2) 60' c, 75' c Con: Harrison (6/9) 10', 20', 34', 36', 50', 61'; Sing (1/1) 76'	Report	Try: Jarrell-Searcy 25' c Con: Hawkins (1/1) 26'

Stadium of Light, Sunderland
Attendance: 42,723
Referee: Aimee Barrett-Theron (South Africa)

FB	15	Ellie Kildunne
RW	14	Abby Dow
OC	13	Megan Jones
IC	12	Tatyana Heard
LW	11	Jess Breach	(substituted off) 67'
FH	10	Zoe Harrison	(substituted off) 61'
SH	9	Natasha Hunt	(substituted off) 61'
N8	8	Alex Matthews
OF	7	Sadia Kabeya
BF	6	Zoe Aldcroft (c)	(substituted off) 61'
RL	5	Abbie Ward	(substituted off) 61'
LL	4	Morwenna Talling
TP	3	Maud Muir	(substituted off) 53'
HK	2	Amy Cokayne	(substituted off) 53'
LP	1	Hannah Botterman	(substituted off) 53'
Replacements:
HK	16	Lark Atkin-Davies	(substituted on) 53'
PR	17	Kelsey Clifford	(substituted on) 53'
PR	18	Sarah Bern	(substituted on) 53'
SR	19	Rosie Galligan	(substituted on) 61'
BR	20	Maddie Feaunati	(substituted on) 61'
SH	21	Lucy Packer	(substituted on) 61'
CE	22	Emily Scarratt	(substituted on) 61'
FB	23	Emma Sing	(substituted on) 67'
Coach:
John Mitchell

FB	15	Lotte Sharp
RW	14	Emily Henrich
OC	13	Ilona Maher
IC	12	Alev Kelter	(yellow card) 27'	(substituted off) 61'
LW	11	Bulou Mataitoga
FH	10	McKenzie Hawkins		(substituted off) 66'
SH	9	Olivia Ortiz		(substituted off) 51'
N8	8	Rachel Johnson
OF	7	Georgie Perris-Redding		(substituted off) 20'
BF	6	Kate Zackary (c)
RL	5	Erica Jarrell-Searcy
LL	4	Tahlia Brody		(substituted off) 53'
TP	3	Keia Mae Sagapolu		(substituted off) 58'
HK	2	Kathryn Treder		(substituted off) 66'
LP	1	Hope Rogers		(substituted off) 66'
Replacements:
HK	16	Paige Stathopoulos		(substituted on) 66'
PR	17	Alivia Leatherman		(substituted on) 66'
PR	18	Charli Jacoby		(substituted on) 58'
SR	19	Rachel Ehrecke		(substituted on) 53'
BR	20	Freda Tafuna		(substituted on) 20'
SH	21	Cassidy Bargell		(substituted on) 51'
FH	22	Kristin Bitter		(substituted on) 66'
WG	23	Sariah Ibarra		(substituted on) 61'
Coach:
Sione Fukofuka

Player of the Match:
Ellie Kildunne (England)

Assistant referees:
Natarsha Ganley (New Zealand)
Maria Heitor (Portugal)
Television match official:
Leo Colgan (Ireland)
Foul play review officer:
Rachel Horton (Australia)

Notes:

- The attendance of 42,723 was the highest in Women's Rugby World Cup history, passing the previous record of 42,579 set at the 2021 Rugby World Cup final.

=== Australia vs Samoa ===
23 August 2025
12:00 BST (UTC+1)

(1 BP) Australia	73–0	Samoa
Try: Amosa 2' c Miller (3) 6' m, 26' m, 33' c Halse (2) 10' c, 77' c Chancellor 15' c Karpani 21' c Smith 52' c Talakai (2) 66' c, 75' c Con: Wood (6/8) 3', 11', 16', 22', 34', 53'; Cramer (3/3) 67', 76', 78'	Report

Salford Community Stadium, Manchester
Attendance: 10,054 (Note: This fixture was sold under a single ticket with the Scotland vs Wales Pool B match. The recorded attendance corresponds to the Scotland vs Wales game.)
Referee: Lauren Jenner (Italy)

FB	15	Caitlyn Halse	(substituted off) 53'	(substituted on) 74'
RW	14	Maya Stewart
OC	13	Georgina Friedrichs
IC	12	Cecilia Smith
LW	11	Desiree Miller		(substituted off) 74'
FH	10	Faitala Moleka	(substituted off) 53'
SH	9	Samantha Wood	(substituted off) 53'
N8	8	Tabua Tuinakauvadra	(substituted off) 53'
OF	7	Emily Chancellor
BF	6	Piper Duck
RL	5	Michaela Leonard
LL	4	Kaitlan Leaney (c)	(substituted off) 66'
TP	3	Asoiva Karpani	(substituted off) 47'
HK	2	Katalina Amosa	(substituted off) 47'
LP	1	Faliki Pohiva	(substituted off) 47'
Replacements:
HK	16	Adiana Talakai	(substituted on) 47'
PR	17	Brianna Hoy	(substituted on) 47'
PR	18	Bridie O'Gorman	(substituted on) 47'
SR	19	Ashley Fernandez	(substituted on) 66'
BR	20	Ashley Marsters	(substituted on) 53'
SH	21	Layne Morgan	(substituted on) 53'
FH	22	Tia Hinds	(substituted on) 53'
FB	23	Lori Cramer	(substituted on) 53'
Coach:
Joanne Yapp

FB	15	Karla Wright-Akeli
RW	14	Lutia Col Aumua
OC	13	Keilamarita Pouri-Lane
IC	12	Fa'asua Makisi		(substituted off) 66'
LW	11	Drenna Falaniko
FH	10	Harmony Vatau
SH	9	Ana-Maria Afuie		(substituted off) 66'
N8	8	Utumalama Atonio		(substituted off) 29'
OF	7	Sui Tauaua-Pauaraisa (c)
BF	6	Sinead Ryder		(substituted off) 14'	(substituted on) 27'	(substituted off) 48'
RL	5	Demielle Onesemo-Tuilaepa		(substituted off) 63'
LL	4	Ana-Lise Sio		(substituted off) 41'
TP	3	Glory Aiono Samuelu		(substituted off) 41'
HK	2	Avau Valentina Filimaua		(substituted off) 41'	(substituted on) 72'
LP	1	Ana Mamea	(yellow card) 21'	(substituted off) 41'
Replacements:
HK	16	Cathy Ulu'ulumatafolau Leuta		(substituted on) 41'
PR	17	Denise Aiolupotea		(substituted on) 41'
PR	18	Tori Iosefo		(substituted on) 41'	(substituted off) 72'
SR	19	JayJay Taylor		(substituted on) 41'
BR	20	Madisen-Jade Iva		(substituted on) 63'
BR	21	Christabelle Onesemo-Tuilaepa		(substituted on) 14'	(substituted off) 27'	(substituted on) 48'
FB	22	Melina Salale	(red card) 73'	(substituted on) 66'
SH	23	Fa'alua Tugaga		(substituted on) 66'
Coach:
Mata'afa Ramsey Tomokino

Player of the Match:
Cecilia Smith (Australia)

Assistant referees:
Precious Pazani (Zimbabwe)
Amelia Luciano (United States)
Television match official:
Matteo Liperini (Italy)
Foul play review officer:
Andrew McMenemy (Scotland)

Notes:

- This was Australia's largest ever victory at a World Cup, surpassing their previous record win of 62–0 against South Africa in 2010.

=== England vs Samoa ===
30 August 2025
17:00 BST (UTC+1)

(1 BP) England	92–3	Samoa
Try: Jones (2) 3' c, 16' m Breach (3) 8' c, 53' c, 74' m Bern 14' c Feaunati 24' c Atkin-Davies 29' c L. Packer 33' c Clifford 50' c Carson 60' c Rowland 64' c M. Packer 70' m Moloney-MacDonald 80' c Con: Rowland (11/14) 4', 9', 15', 25', 30', 34', 51', 54', 61', 65', 80+1'	Report	Pen: Vatau (1/1) 44'

Franklin's Gardens, Northampton
Attendance: 13,615
Referee: Maggie Cogger-Orr (New Zealand)

FB	15	Emma Sing
RW	14	Jess Breach
OC	13	Megan Jones	(substituted off) 64'
IC	12	Jade Shekells
LW	11	Claudia Moloney-MacDonald
FH	10	Helena Rowland
SH	9	Lucy Packer	(substituted off) 64'
N8	8	Maddie Feaunati
OF	7	Marlie Packer (c)
BF	6	Abi Burton
RL	5	Rosie Galligan
LL	4	Lilli Ives Campion
TP	3	Sarah Bern	(substituted off) 54'
HK	2	Lark Atkin-Davies	(substituted off) 54'
LP	1	Kelsey Clifford	(substituted off) 54'
Replacements:
HK	16	May Campbell	(substituted on) 54'
PR	17	Mackenzie Carson	(substituted on) 54'
PR	18	Maud Muir	(substituted on) 54'
SR	19	Morwenna Talling
BR	20	Sadia Kabeya
SH	21	Natasha Hunt	(substituted on) 64'
FH	22	Zoe Harrison	(substituted on) 64'
FB	23	Ellie Kildunne
Coach:
John Mitchell

FB	15	Karla Wright-Akeli
RW	14	Davina Lasini
OC	13	Keilamarita Pouri-Lane
IC	12	Fa'asua Makisi	(substituted off) 51'
LW	11	Linda Fiafia	(substituted off) 58'
FH	10	Harmony Vatau
SH	9	Ana-Maria Afuie	(substituted off) 51'
N8	8	Nina Foaese
OF	7	Sui Tauaua-Pauaraisa (c)
BF	6	Utumalama Atonio
RL	5	Demielle Onesemo-Tuilaepa	(substituted off) 41'
LL	4	Christabelle Onesemo-Tuilaepa	(substituted off) 56'
TP	3	Glory Aiono Samuelu	(substituted off) 32'	(substituted on) 69'
HK	2	Faith Nonutunu	(substituted off) 63'
LP	1	Denise Aiolupotea	(substituted off) 52'
Replacements:
HK	16	Cathy Ulu'ulumatafolau Leuta	(substituted on) 63'
PR	17	Ti Tauasosi	(substituted on) 52'
PR	18	Tori Iosefo	(substituted on) 32'	(substituted off) 69'
SR	19	Ana-Lise Sio	(substituted on) 41'
BR	20	Madisen-Jade Iva	(substituted on) 56'
SH	21	Saelua Leaula	(substituted on) 51'
FB	22	Taytana Pati Ah-Cheung	(substituted on) 51'
WG	23	Michelle Curry	(substituted on) 58'
Coach:
Mata'afa Ramsey Tomokino

Player of the Match:
Helena Rowland (England)

Assistant referees:
Clara Munarini (Italy)
Amber Stamp-Dunstan (Wales)
Television match official:
Matteo Liperini (Italy)
Foul play review officer:
Quinton Immelman (South Africa)

Notes:

- This was England's biggest ever win at a World Cup, for both total points scored (surpassing the 84–19 victory against Fiji in 2021) and overall winning margin (surpassing the 82–0 victory against Kazakhstan in 2010).
- Helena Rowland set a new record for most points scored in a World Cup match by an England player (27), surpassing the previous record of 25 scored by Nicky Crawford against Sweden in 1998, and Sue Day against Italy in 2002.

=== United States vs Australia ===
30 August 2025
19:30 BST (UTC+1)

(1 BP) United States	31–31	Australia (1 BP)
Try: Tafuna (2) 27' m, 51' c Sagapolu 45' m Rogers 67' c Jarrell-Searcy 71' c Con: Hawkins (3/5) 52', 68', 72'	Report	Try: Miller (2) 7' c, 54' m Halse (2) 39' c, 58' c Karpani 72' m Con: Wood (3/5) 8', 40', 59'

York Community Stadium, York
Attendance: 7,828
Referee: Sara Cox (England)

FB	15	Lotte Sharp
RW	14	Cheta Emba	(substituted off) 56'
OC	13	Ilona Maher
IC	12	Emily Henrich
LW	11	Erica Coulibaly
FH	10	McKenzie Hawkins
SH	9	Cassidy Bargell	(substituted off) 68'
N8	8	Rachel Johnson
OF	7	Kate Zackary (c)
BF	6	Freda Tafuna	(substituted off) 68'
RL	5	Erica Jarrell-Searcy
LL	4	Hallie Taufo'ou	(substituted off) 77'
TP	3	Keia Mae Sagapolu
HK	2	Kathryn Treder
LP	1	Hope Rogers
Replacements:
HK	16	Paige Stathopoulos
PR	17	Alivia Leatherman
PR	18	Charli Jacoby
SR	19	Rachel Ehrecke	(substituted on) 77'
BR	20	Tahlia Brody	(substituted on) 68'
SH	21	Olivia Ortiz	(substituted on) 68'
FH	22	Gabby Cantorna	(substituted on) 56'
WG	23	Sariah Ibarra
Coach:
Sione Fukofuka

FB	15	Caitlyn Halse
RW	14	Maya Stewart
OC	13	Georgina Friedrichs
IC	12	Cecilia Smith	(substituted off) 61'
LW	11	Desiree Miller
FH	10	Faitala Moleka	(substituted off) 72'
SH	9	Samantha Wood
N8	8	Tabua Tuinakauvadra
OF	7	Emily Chancellor	(substituted off) 52'
BF	6	Piper Duck
RL	5	Michaela Leonard
LL	4	Kaitlan Leaney (c)
TP	3	Bridie O'Gorman	(substituted off) 61'
HK	2	Tania Naden	(substituted off) 56'
LP	1	Faliki Pohiva	(substituted off) 43'
Replacements:
HK	16	Katalina Amosa	(substituted on) 56'
PR	17	Lydia Kavoa	(substituted on) 43'
PR	18	Asoiva Karpani	(substituted on) 61'
SR	19	Annabelle Codey
BR	20	Ashley Marsters	(substituted on) 52'
SH	21	Layne Morgan
CE	22	Trilleen Pomare	(substituted on) 61'
FH	23	Tia Hinds	(substituted on) 72'
Coach:
Joanne Yapp

Player of the Match:
Freda Tafuna (United States)

Assistant referees:
Precious Pazani (Zimbabwe)
Maria Heitor (Portugal)
Television match official:
Andrew McMenemy (Scotland)
Foul play review officer:
Ian Tempest (England)

Notes:

- This was the first drawn result in a World Cup match since 2014, when England and Canada drew 13–13.

=== United States vs Samoa ===
6 September 2025
13:30 BST (UTC+1)

(1 BP) United States	60–0	Samoa
Try: Tafuna (4) 6' m, 44' m, 51' c, 66' c Rogers (2) 11' m, 24' m Bargell 27' c Coulibaly 30' m Jarrell-Searcy 41' c Ortiz 77' c Con: Cantorna (5/10) 28', 42', 52', 67', 78'	Report

York Community Stadium, York
Attendance: 7,124
Referee: Natarsha Ganley (New Zealand)

FB	15	Sariah Ibarra
RW	14	Emily Henrich		(substituted off) 48'
OC	13	Ilona Maher
IC	12	Gabby Cantorna
LW	11	Erica Coulibaly
FH	10	McKenzie Hawkins		(substituted off) 48'
SH	9	Cassidy Bargell		(substituted off) 61'
N8	8	Rachel Johnson		(substituted off) 54'
OF	7	Kate Zackary (c)
BF	6	Freda Tafuna
RL	5	Erica Jarrell-Searcy
LL	4	Hallie Taufo'ou		(substituted off) 67'
TP	3	Keia Mae Sagapolu		(substituted off) 61'
HK	2	Kathryn Treder		(substituted off) 54'
LP	1	Hope Rogers		(substituted off) 61'
Replacements:
HK	16	Paige Stathopoulos		(substituted on) 54'
PR	17	Maya Learned		(substituted on) 61'
PR	18	Alivia Leatherman		(substituted on) 61'
BR	19	Tahlia Brody		(substituted on) 67'
BR	20	Georgie Perris-Redding		(substituted on) 54'
SH	21	Olivia Ortiz		(substituted on) 61'
FH	22	Kristin Bitter	(yellow card) 60'	(substituted on) 48'
CE	23	Alev Kelter		(substituted on) 48'
Coach:
Sione Fukofuka

FB	15	Taytana Pati Ah-Cheung
RW	14	Lutia Col Aumua	(substituted off) 53'
OC	13	Keilamarita Pouri-Lane
IC	12	Harmony Vatau
LW	11	Drenna Falaniko
FH	10	Karla Wright-Akeli
SH	9	Ana-Maria Afuie	(substituted off) 61'
N8	8	Joanna Fanene-Lolo	(substituted off) 36'	(substituted on) 41'	(substituted off) 48'
OF	7	Sui Tauaua-Pauaraisa (c)
BF	6	Utumalama Atonio	(substituted off) 48'
RL	5	Demielle Onesemo-Tuilaepa
LL	4	Ana-Lise Sio	(substituted off) 41'
TP	3	Tori Iosefo	(substituted off) 41'
HK	2	Avau Valentina Filimaua	(substituted off) 41'
LP	1	Denise Aiolupotea	(substituted off) 41'
Replacements:
HK	16	Faith Nonutunu	(substituted on) 41'
PR	17	Ana Mamea	(substituted on) 41'
PR	18	Glory Aiono Samuelu	(substituted on) 41'
SR	19	JayJay Taylor	(substituted on) 41'
BR	20	Nina Foaese	(substituted on) 48'
BR	21	Sinead Ryder	(substituted on) 36'	(substituted off) 41'	(substituted on) 48'
SH	22	Faalua Tugaga	(substituted on) 61'
CE	23	Fa'asua Makisi	(substituted on) 53'
Coach:
Mata'afa Ramsey Tomokino

Player of the Match:
Freda Tafuna (United States)

Assistant referees:
Holly Wood (England)
Amber Stamp-Dunstan (Wales)
Television match official:
Ian Tempest (England)
Foul play review officer:
Matteo Liperini (Italy)

=== England vs Australia ===
6 September 2025
17:00 BST (UTC+1)

(1 BP) England	47–7	Australia
Try: Breach 8' m Ward 32' c Kabeya (2) 38' c, 44' c Clifford (2) 53' c, 58' c Bern 65' c Con: Harrison (6/7) 33', 39', 45', 54', 59', 66'	Report	Try: Talakai 6' c Con: Wood (1/1) 7'

Brighton & Hove Albion Stadium, Brighton
Attendance: 30,433
Referee: Aurélie Groizeleau (France)

FB	15	Ellie Kildunne		(substituted off) 46'
RW	14	Abby Dow
OC	13	Megan Jones
IC	12	Tatyana Heard		(substituted off) 62'
LW	11	Jess Breach
FH	10	Zoe Harrison
SH	9	Natasha Hunt		(substituted off) 62'
N8	8	Alex Matthews (c)
OF	7	Sadia Kabeya			(substituted off) 80'
BF	6	Morwenna Talling		(substituted off) 57'
RL	5	Abbie Ward
LL	4	Rosie Galligan		(substituted off) 62'
TP	3	Maud Muir		(substituted off) 54'	(substituted on) 80'
HK	2	Amy Cokayne		(substituted off) 54'
LP	1	Hannah Botterman		(substituted off) 25'
Replacements:
HK	16	Lark Atkin-Davies		(substituted on) 54'
PR	17	Kelsey Clifford		(substituted on) 25'
PR	18	Sarah Bern	(yellow card) 71'	(substituted on) 54'
SR	19	Lilli Ives Campion		(substituted on) 62'
BR	20	Maddie Feaunati		(substituted on) 57'
SH	21	Lucy Packer		(substituted on) 62'
FH	22	Holly Aitchison		(substituted on) 62'
CE	23	Helena Rowland		(substituted on) 46'
Coach:
John Mitchell

FB	15	Caitlyn Halse
RW	14	Maya Stewart
OC	13	Georgina Friedrichs
IC	12	Trilleen Pomare		(substituted off) 63'
LW	11	Desiree Miller
FH	10	Faitala Moleka	(yellow card) 53'	(substituted off) 63'
SH	9	Samantha Wood
N8	8	Siokapesi Palu (c)		(substituted off) 46'
OF	7	Ashley Marsters		(substituted off) 57'
BF	6	Piper Duck
RL	5	Michaela Leonard		(substituted off) 66'
LL	4	Kaitlan Leaney
TP	3	Asoiva Karpani
HK	2	Adiana Talakai		(substituted off) 41'
LP	1	Lydia Kavoa		(substituted off) 33'
Replacements:
HK	16	Tania Naden		(substituted on) 41'
PR	17	Faliki Pohiva		(substituted on) 33'	(substituted off) 60'
PR	18	Bridie O'Gorman			(substituted on) 60'
SR	19	Annabelle Codey		(substituted on) 66'
BR	20	Emily Chancellor		(substituted on) 57'
BR	21	Tabua Tuinakauvadra		(substituted on) 46'
FH	22	Tia Hinds		(substituted on) 63'
CE	23	Cecilia Smith		(substituted on) 63'
Coach:
Joanne Yapp

Player of the Match:
Alex Matthews (England)

Assistant referees:
Precious Pazani (Zimbabwe)
Amelia Luciano (United States)
Television match official:
Quinton Immelman (South Africa)
Foul play review officer:
Matteo Liperini (Italy)

Notes:

- Jess Breach (England) earned her 50th test cap.
- England won their 30th consecutive test match, matching their own world record set between 2019 and 2022.
