= List of 2023–24 Premiership Women's Rugby transfers =

This is a list of player transfers involving Premiership Women's Rugby teams before or during the 2023–24 season.

The list consists of permanent player movements or temporary loan deals that have been officially confirmed, and are either from or to one of the 10 rugby union teams competing in Premiership Women's Rugby in 2023–24 – the first season under the league's new branding, after six years of operating as the Premier 15s. It is not unknown for confirmed transfers to be cancelled at a later date.

Transfers involving Trailfinders and Leicester Tigers are included for the first time, with both clubs making their Premiership Women's Rugby debut from the beginning of the 2023–24 season. Meanwhile, DMP Sharks and Wasps are excluded, having both dropped out of the competition following the conclusion of the 2022–23 season.

Transfers involving Worcester Warriors, who completed the 2022–23 season, are documented on this list. However, the club is not competing during 2023–24 as originally intended, due to its withdrawal from the league in October 2023 – prior to the start of the regular season – because of insufficient funds to continue operating.

== Bristol Bears ==
=== Players in ===
- (England) Meg Varley from (England) Worcester Warriors
- (Scotland) Ellian Clarke from (Scotland) Edinburgh University
- (Scotland) Meryl Smith from (Scotland) Edinburgh University
- (England) Hannah Botterman from (England) Saracens
- (England) Holly Aitchison from (England) Saracens
- (England) Nicola Beet from (England) Wasps
- (England) Helene Cuax from (England) Wasps
- (Scotland) Evie Gallagher from (England) Worcester Warriors
- (Scotland) Lana Skeldon from (England) Worcester Warriors

=== Players out ===
- (England) Rosie Inman to (England) Trailfinders
- (New Zealand) Sammy Wong to (England) Exeter Chiefs
- (England) Abbie Parsons (released)
- (England) Megan Barwick to (England) Trailfinders
- (England) Alice Lockwood (released)
- (Scotland) Lyndsay O'Donnell (released)
- (England) Kyra Martin (released)
- (England) Daisie Mayes (released)
- (England) Jo Smith (released)
- (England) Lauren Smyth (released)
- (England) Amy Layzell to (England) Harlequins
- (Wales) Elinor Snowsill (retired)
- (Wales) Megan Davies to (Wales) Brython Thunder (short-term loan)
- (Wales) Bryonie King to (Wales) Gwalia Lightning (short-term loan)

== Exeter Chiefs ==
=== Players in ===
- (England) Harriet Millar-Mills (unattached)
- (New Zealand) Sammy Wong from (England) Bristol Bears
- (Japan) Kanako Kobayashi (unattached)
- (Canada) Alex Tessier from (Canada) Sainte-Anne-de-Bellevue
- (United States) Olivia Ortiz from (England) DMP Sharks
- (England) Kate Smith from (England) DMP Sharks
- (Wales) Eloise Hayward from (England) Leeds Rhinos
- (New Zealand) Maddie Feaunati from (New Zealand) Hurricanes Poua
- (Scotland) Demi Swann from (England) Worcester Warriors
- (England) Jodie Ounsley (unattached)
- (England) Sasha Acheson (unattached)
- (England) Charlie Budge from (England) Exeter Athletic
- (England) Connie Clarke from (England) Exeter University
- (England) Lucy Ward from (England) Exeter University

=== Players out ===
- (England) Georgie Grimes to (England) Leicester Tigers
- (Canada) McKinley Hunt to (England) Saracens
- (Wales) Abbie Fleming to (England) Harlequins
- (England) Flo Robinson to (England) Harlequins
- (Italy) Silvia Turani to (England) Harlequins
- (Ireland) Charlie Willett to (England) Trailfinders
- (United States) Kate Zackary to (England) Trailfinders
- (New Zealand) Liv McGoverne to (New Zealand) Matatū
- (Scotland) Panashe Muzambe to (Scotland) Edinburgh (short-term loan)
- (Scotland) Demi Swann to (Scotland) Glasgow Warriors (short-term loan)
- (Scotland) Mairi McDonald to (Scotland) Glasgow Warriors (short-term loan)
- (Ireland) Edel McMahon to (Ireland) Clovers (short-term loan)
- (Wales) Robyn Wilkins to (Wales) Gwalia Lightning (short-term loan)
- (Australia) Lori Cramer to (Australia) Queensland Reds
- (England) Jodie Ounsley (released)

== Gloucester-Hartpury ==
=== Players in ===
- (Netherlands) Elizabeth Shermer from (England) Worcester Warriors
- (Wales) Catherine Richards from (Wales) Cardiff Metropolitan University
- (England) Trudy Cowan from (England) DMP Sharks
- (Spain) Carmen Castellucci from (France) Bobigny 93
- (England) Mackenzie Carson from (England) Saracens
- (Scotland) Caity Mattinson from (England) Worcester Warriors

=== Players out ===
- (England) Connie Powell to (England) Harlequins
- (Wales) Siwan Lillicrap (retired)
- (England) Sophie Bridger to (England) Saracens
- (Wales) Gwennan Hopkins to (Wales) Gwalia Lightning (short-term loan)
- (Wales) Nel Metcalfe to (Wales) Gwalia Lightning (short-term loan)
- (Wales) Catherine Richards to (Wales) Gwalia Lightning (short-term loan)
- (Scotland) Evie Addy to (Scotland) Edinburgh (short-term loan)
- (Scotland) Gemma Bell to (Scotland) Edinburgh (short-term loan)
- (Scotland) Leia Brebner-Holden to (Scotland) Edinburgh (short-term loan)
- (Scotland) Caity Mattinson to (Scotland) Edinburgh (short-term loan)
- (Wales) Abbey Constable to (Wales) Gwalia Lightning (short-term loan)
- (Wales) Lisa Neumann to (England) Harlequins
- (Netherlands) Elizabeth Shermer to (England) Sale Sharks

== Harlequins ==
=== Players in ===
- (England) Connie Powell from (England) Gloucester-Hartpury
- (England) Shaunagh Brown (unattached)
- (South Africa) Aseza Hele from (South Africa) Boland Dames
- (England) Ella Cromack from (England) Wasps
- (Wales) Abbie Fleming from (England) Exeter Chiefs
- (England) Flo Robinson from (England) Exeter Chiefs
- (Italy) Silvia Turani from (England) Exeter Chiefs
- (England) Amy Layzell from (England) Bristol Bears
- (England) Kirsty Hillier from (England) Wasps
- (Jamaica) Makeda Lewis from (England) Wasps
- (Nigeria) Grace Izinyon from (England) University of Cambridge
- (Scotland) Isabella Hannway from (England) DMP Sharks
- (England) Lauren Fisher from (England) DMP Sharks
- (South Africa) Danelle Lochner from (South Africa) Western Province
- (Wales) Carys Phillips from (England) Worcester Warriors
- (Wales) Lisa Neumann from (England) Gloucester-Hartpury

=== Players out ===
- (England) Abby Dow to (England) Trailfinders
- (England) Amy Cokayne to (England) Leicester Tigers
- (England) Davinia Catlin (retired)
- (England) Chloe Edwards (retired)
- (England) Rowena Burnfield to (England) Trailfinders
- (England) Lauren Brooks to (England) Trailfinders
- (France) Lénaïg Corson (retired)
- (England) Rosie Galligan to (England) Saracens
- (England) Ellie Green to (England) Worcester Warriors
- (Scotland) Beth Blacklock to (England) Saracens
- (Ireland) Megan Brodie to (England) Trailfinders
- (England) Ellie Boatman to (England) Trailfinders
- (Ireland) Emma Swords to (England) Trailfinders
- (Belgium) Ella Amory to (England) Trailfinders
- (England) Kira Leat to (England) Trailfinders
- (Scotland) Izzy Hannay to (Scotland) Glasgow Warriors (short-term loan)
- (Australia) Bella McKenzie to (Australia) NSW Waratahs
- (Australia) Kaitlan Leaney to (Australia) NSW Waratahs
- (England) Bryony Cleall to (England) Saracens

== Leicester Tigers ==
=== Players in ===
- (England) Megan Jones from (England) Wasps
- (England) Celia Quansah from (England) Wasps
- (Scotland) Leah Bartlett from (England) Loughborough Lightning
- (England) Amy Cokayne from (England) Harlequins
- (United States) Tahlia Brody from (England) Cheltenham Tigers
- (United States) Tess Feury from (England) DMP Sharks
- (United States) Keia Mae Sagapolu from (United States) Central Washington Wildcats
- (England) Alana Bainbridge from (England) Wasps
- (England) Georgie Grimes from (England) Exeter Chiefs
- (South Africa) Catha Jacobs from (England) Saracens
- (Sweden) Amanda Swartz from (England) Loughborough Lightning
- (Wales) Amelia Tutt from (England) Loughborough Lightning
- (England) Tami Agboola from (England) Kenilworth
- (England) Caitlin Clark from (England) Wasps
- (England) Maddie Massey from (England) Cheltenham Tigers
- (England) Sydney Mead from (England) Wasps
- (England) Amy Orrow from (England) Sale Sharks
- (Scotland) Eva Donaldson from (Scotland) Edinburgh University
- (Scotland) Elis Martin from (England) DMP Sharks
- (Scotland) Francesca McGhie from (Scotland) Watsonians
- (Scotland) Evie Wills from (Scotland) Hillhead Jordanhill
- (Wales) Rebecca De Filippo from (England) Saracens
- (Scotland) Lisa Cockburn from (England) Worcester Warriors
- (England) Sarah Nicholas from (England) Worcester Warriors
- (Canada) Claire Gallagher from (Canada) Ottawa Gee-Gees
- (Canada) Julia Omokhuale from (Canada) Calgary Dinos
- (England) Jemima Moss from (England) Worcester Warriors

=== Players out ===
- (Wales) Rebecca De Filippo to (Wales) Gwalia Lightning (short-term loan)
- (Scotland) Orla Proctor to (Scotland) Edinburgh (short-term loan)

== Loughborough Lightning ==
=== Players in ===
- (United States) Hallie Taufo'ou from (United States) Beantown
- (United States) Kathryn Treder from (England) DMP Sharks
- (Canada) Abby Duguid from (Canada) Nor'Westers Athletic Association
- (England) Karolina Kacirkova from (England) DMP Sharks
- (England) Catherine Wells from (England) Worcester Warriors

=== Players out ===
- (England) Detysha Harper to (England) Sale Sharks
- (England) Nikita Prothero to (England) Sale Sharks
- (Scotland) Leah Bartlett to (England) Leicester Tigers
- (England) Morwenna Talling to (England) Sale Sharks
- (Sweden) Amanda Swartz to (England) Leicester Tigers
- (Wales) Amelia Tutt to (England) Leicester Tigers
- (England) Abi Burton to (England) Trailfinders
- (England) Bryony Field to (England) Saracens
- (Wales) Molly Kelly to (England) Sale Sharks
- (Scotland) Jenny Maxwell to (Scotland) Edinburgh (short-term loan)

== Sale Sharks ==
=== Players in ===
- (England) Detysha Harper from (England) Loughborough Lightning
- (England) Morwenna Talling from (England) Loughborough Lightning
- (England) Nikita Prothero from (England) Loughborough Lightning
- (Ireland) Jo Brown from (England) Worcester Warriors
- (South Africa) Amber Schonert from (England) Cheltenham Tigers
- (Italy) Beatrice Rigoni from (Italy) Valsugana
- (Wales) Molly Kelly from (England) Loughborough Lightning
- (United States) India Perris-Redding from (England) Sale FC 1861
- (England) Jasmine Hazell from (England) DMP Sharks
- (England) April Ishida from (England) DMP Sharks
- (Japan) Minori Yamamoto from (England) Worcester Warriors
- (England) Frankie Harvey from (England) Worcester Warriors
- (Scotland) Izzy McGuire-Evans from (England) Worcester Warriors
- (Portugal) Sara Moreira from (England) Worcester Warriors
- (Netherlands) Elizabeth Shermer from Gloucester-Hartpury

=== Players out ===
- (England) Katie Houghton (released)
- (Scotland) Nicola Howat (released)
- (United States) Joanna Kitlinski (released)
- (Scotland) Alex Wallace (released)
- (United States) Carly Waters (released)
- (England) Amy Orrow to (England) Leicester Tigers
- (England) Courtney Pursglove to (England) Trailfinders
- (Scotland) Izzy McGuire-Evans to (Scotland) Glasgow Warriors (short-term loan)

== Saracens ==
=== Players in ===
- (England) Joia Bennett from (England) Oaklands College (promoted from Academy)
- (England) Daisy Fitzgerald from (England) Oaklands College (promoted from Academy)
- (England) Amelia MacDougall from (England) Oaklands College (promoted from Academy)
- (Canada) McKinley Hunt from (England) Exeter Chiefs
- (England) Chloe Broom from (England) DMP Sharks
- (England) Rosie Galligan from (England) Harlequins
- (Scotland) Beth Blacklock from (England) Harlequins
- (Scotland) Nic Haynes from (England) DMP Sharks
- (England) Sophie Bridger from (England) Gloucester-Hartpury
- (England) Bryony Field from (England) Loughborough Lightning
- (Canada) Sophie de Goede from (Canada) Castaway Wanderers
- (Canada) Emma Taylor from (Canada) Halifax
- (England) Jess Cockett from (England) Basildon (promoted from Academy)
- (Ireland) May Goulding from (England) Hartpury College (promoted from Academy)
- (England) Suzie Flowers from (England) Wasps
- (England) Lottie Kissick-Jones from (England) Richmond
- (England) Jemma-Jo Linkins from (England) Wasps
- (England) Akina Gondwe from (England) Worcester Warriors
- (England) Tori Sellors from (England) Worcester Warriors
- (Canada) Paige Farries from (England) Worcester Warriors
- (England) Carmen Tremelling from (England) Worcester Warriors
- (England) Bryony Cleall from (England) Harlequins

=== Players out ===
- (England) Rocky Clark (retired)
- (Wales) Kat Evans (retired)
- (England) Sarah Bebbington (retired)
- (England) Hannah Botterman to (England) Bristol Bears
- (South Africa) Catha Jacobs to (England) Leicester Tigers
- (England) Holly Aitchison to (England) Bristol Bears
- (England) Sophie Shams to (England) Trailfinders
- (England) Emma Uren to (England) Trailfinders
- (England) Mackenzie Carson to (England) Gloucester-Hartpury
- Alysha Corrigan to Canada Sevens
- (Scotland) Jodie Rettie (released)
- (England) Chantelle Miell (released)
- (Wales) Rebecca De Filippo to (England) Leicester Tigers
- (Canada) Alex Ellis to (France) Stade Français Pink Rockets
- (Scotland) Nic Haynes to (Scotland) Edinburgh (short-term loan)
- (Scotland) Fiona McIntosh to (Scotland) Edinburgh (short-term loan)
- (Scotland) Louise McMillan to (Scotland) Glasgow Warriors (short-term loan)
- (Scotland) Beth Blacklock to (Scotland) Glasgow Warriors (short-term loan)
- (Ireland) Grace Moore to (Ireland) Wolfhounds (short-term loan)
- (Scotland) Coreen Grant to (Scotland) Glasgow Warriors (short-term loan)

== Trailfinders ==
=== Players in ===
- (England) Abby Dow from (England) Harlequins
- (England) Liz Crake from (England) Wasps
- (England) Jo Bucknall from (England) Brunel University
- (England) Annabel Meta from (England) Henley College
- (England) Lauren Knowler from (England) Henley College
- (England) Rowena Burnfield from (England) Harlequins
- (Japan) Kie Tamai from (Japan) Mie Pearls
- (England) Lauren Brooks from (England) Harlequins
- (Ireland) Andrea Stock from (England) Wasps
- (Scotland) Fiona Cooper from (England) Wasps
- (England) Shya Pinnock from (England) Wasps
- (England) Jess Cooksey from (England) Wasps
- (Canada) Tyson Beukeboom from (Canada) Cowichan
- (England) Rosie Inman from (England) Bristol Bears
- (France) Élisa Riffonneau from (France) Stade Rennais
- (United States) Sophie Ragg from (United States) Pittsburgh Steeltoes
- (United States) Meya Bizer from (England) DMP Sharks
- (Spain) Cristina Blanco from (England) Wasps
- (England) Abi Burton from (England) Loughborough Lightning
- (England) Charlotte Cheshire from (England) Wasps
- (Canada) Julia Schell from (Canada) Castaway Wanderers
- (Italy) Sara Seye from (Italy) Calvisano
- (England) Sophie Shams from (England) Saracens
- (Ireland) Amanda McQuade from (Ireland) Railway Union
- (Ireland) Megan Brodie from (England) Harlequins
- (Poland) Alex Zdunek from (England) Blackheath
- (New Zealand) Shannon Ikahihifo from (New Zealand) Auckland Storm
- (England) Ellie Lennon from (England) Wasps
- (England) Amy Wilson-Hardy from (England) Wasps
- (England) Emma Uren from (England) Saracens
- (England) Ellie Boatman from (England) Harlequins
- (England) Megan Barwick from (England) Bristol Bears
- (England) Courtney Pursglove from (England) Sale Sharks
- (Ireland) Emma Swords from (England) Harlequins
- (South Africa) Lindelwa Gwala from (South Africa) Sharks
- (Scotland) Liz Musgrove from (England) Wasps
- (Belgium) Ella Amory from (England) Harlequins
- (England) Sophie Molton from (England) Henley College
- (Ireland) Charlie Willett from (England) Exeter Chiefs
- (United States) Kate Zackary from (England) Exeter Chiefs
- (England) Sian McGuiness from (England) Wasps
- (England) Kira Leat from (England) Harlequins
- (Italy) Sofia Rolfi from (Italy) Colorno
- (England) Cara Brincat from (England) Worcester Warriors
- (England) Ellie Green from (England) Worcester Warriors
- (England) Amelia Buckland-Hurry from (England) Worcester Warriors
- (England) Victoria Laflin from (England) Worcester Warriors
- (England) Charlotte Wright-Haley from (England) Worcester Warriors
- (Canada) Cassandra Tuffnail from (England) Brunel University
- (Wales) Carys Cox from (England) Worcester Warriors
- (England) Louise Dodd from (England) Wasps

== Worcester Warriors ==
=== Players in ===
- (England) Ellie Green from (England) Harlequins
- (England) Molly Saunders from (England) Wasps
- (Scotland) Claudia Mclaren from (Australia) Easts Tigers

=== Players out ===
- (Wales) Caryl Thomas (released)
- (England) Meg Varley to (England) Bristol Bears
- (Ireland) Jo Brown to (England) Sale Sharks
- (Netherlands) Elizabeth Shermer to (England) Gloucester-Hartpury
- (England) Cara Brincat to (England) Trailfinders
- (England) Ellie Green to (England) Trailfinders
- (England) Amelia Buckland-Hurry to (England) Trailfinders
- (England) Victoria Laflin to (England) Trailfinders
- (England) Charlotte Wright-Haley to (England) Trailfinders
- (Scotland) Evie Gallagher to (England) Bristol Bears
- (Scotland) Lana Skeldon to (England) Bristol Bears
- (Scotland) Demi Swann to (England) Exeter Chiefs
- (Wales) Carys Cox to (England) Trailfinders
- (England) Akina Gondwe to (England) Saracens
- (England) Tori Sellors to (England) Saracens
- (Canada) Paige Farries to (England) Saracens
- (Scotland) Caity Mattinson to (England) Gloucester-Hartpury
- (Scotland) Lisa Cockburn to (England) Leicester Tigers
- (England) Sarah Nicholas to (England) Leicester Tigers
- (England) Carmen Tremelling to (England) Saracens
- (Wales) Carys Phillips to (England) Harlequins
- (Japan) Minori Yamamoto to (England) Sale Sharks
- (England) Catherine Wells to (England) Loughborough Lightning
- (Wales) Hannah Bluck to (Wales) Brython Thunder
- (Wales) Alex Callender to (Wales) Brython Thunder
- (Wales) Sioned Harries to (Wales) Brython Thunder
- (Wales) Natalia John to (Wales) Brython Thunder
- (Wales) Niamh Terry to (Wales) Brython Thunder
- (England) Frankie Harvey to (England) Sale Sharks
- (Scotland) Izzy McGuire-Evans to (England) Sale Sharks
- (Portugal) Sara Moreira to (England) Sale Sharks
- (England) Jemima Moss to (England) Leicester Tigers
- (Scotland) Claudia Mclaren to (Scotland) Glasgow Warriors
