= 2025 Women's Rugby World Cup final =

Women's rugby union event in England

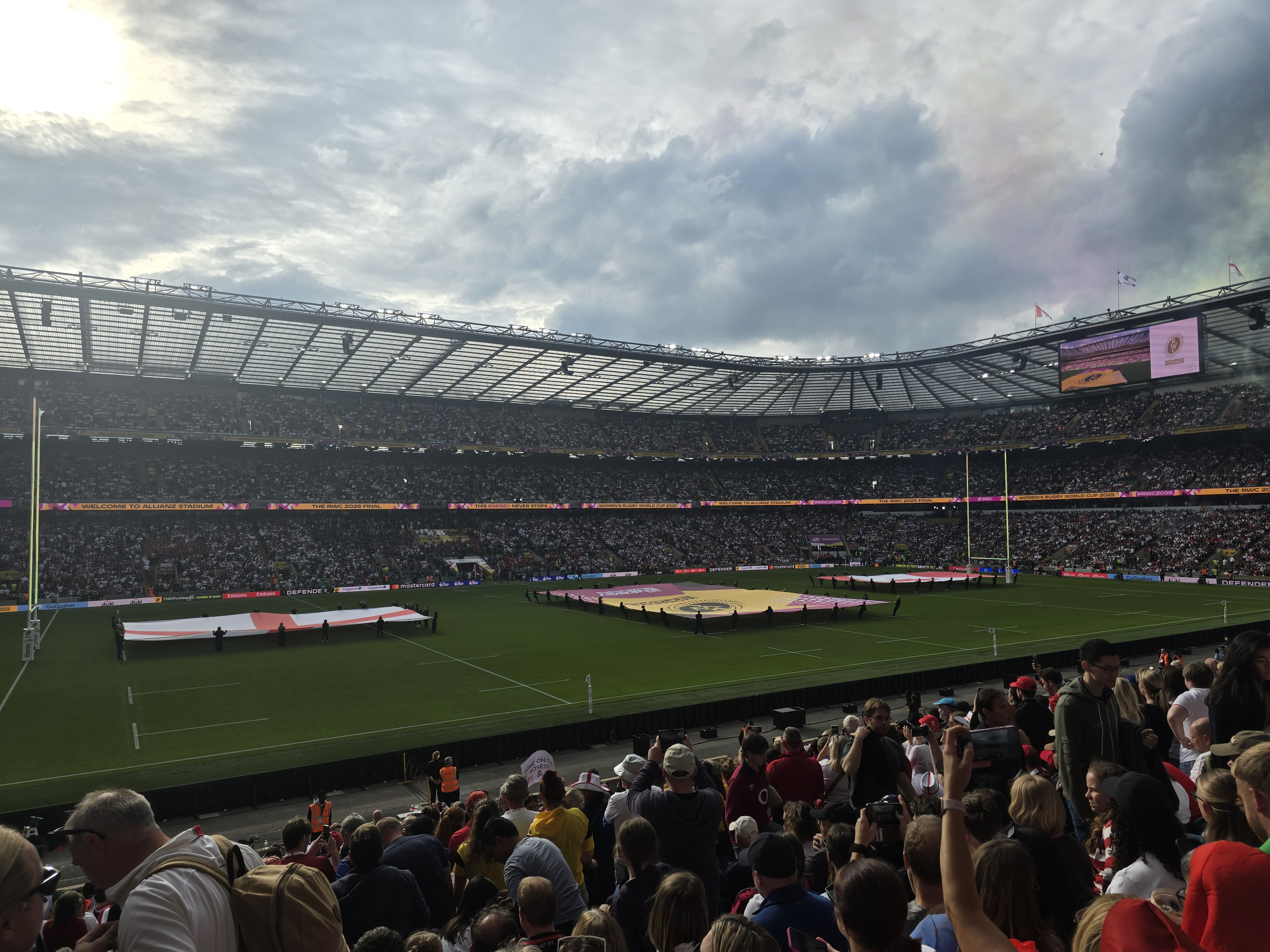
- Twickenham Stadium in London hosted the match
- Event: 2025 Women's Rugby World Cup
Canada	England
(Canada)	(England)
13	33
- Date: 27 September 2025
- Venue: Twickenham Stadium, London
- Player of the Match: Sadia Kabeya (England)
- Referee: Hollie Davidson (Scotland)
- Attendance: 81,885
- Weather: Partly Cloudy; 16 °C (61 °F); 59% humidity

The 2025 Women's Rugby World Cup final was a rugby union match played on 27 September 2025 at Twickenham Stadium in London, England. It was the culmination of the 2025 Women's Rugby World Cup, played between Canada and England. England beat Canada 33–13 to win their third Rugby World Cup. England flanker Sadia Kabeya was named player of the match.

The match was held on the same day as the bronze final.

== Background ==
The 2025 Women's Rugby World Cup, the tenth edition of the women's Rugby World Cup, was held in England between 22 August and 27 September 2025. Sixteen teams competed in the final tournament, playing 32 matches. The top four placed teams from the 2021 World Cup automatically qualified for the tournament, while the remaining twelve spots were decided in qualifying rounds. The sixteen teams were divided into four pools of four, with each team playing each other once in a round-robin format. The top two teams from each pool qualified for the quarter-finals. The final was awarded to Twickenham Stadium at the same time England were announced as hosts.

On 19 August 2025, the final was announced as a sell out with all 82,000 tickets sold. With 82,000 tickets sold, the final was on track to become the second-highest attended Rugby World Cup final (men's or women's), behind only the 2003 Men's Rugby World Cup final, which had an attendance of 82,957. The expected crowd would also surpass the attendance record for a women's rugby event of 66,000, set during the 2024 Summer Olympics women's rugby sevens, as well as the record for a standalone women's rugby match of 58,498, set at Twickenham Stadium during the 2023 Women's Six Nations Championship.

== Route to the final ==
Canada
Round
England
Pool B
Pool stage
Pool A
Opponent
Result
Opponent
Result
Fiji
65–7
Match 1
United States
69–7
Wales
42–0
Match 2
Samoa
92–3
Scotland
40–19
Match 3
Australia
47–7

Pos	Team	Pld	W	D	L	PF	PA	TF	TA	B	Pts
1	Canada	3	3	0	0	147	26	23	4	3	15
2	Scotland	3	2	0	1	86	63	14	10	2	10
3	Fiji	3	1	0	2	50	119	8	21	1	5
4	Wales	3	0	0	3	33	108	6	16	2	2

Source: World Rugby
Final standing

Pos	Team	Pld	W	D	L	PF	PA	TF	TA	B	Pts
1	England (H)	3	3	0	0	208	17	32	2	3	15
2	Australia	3	1	1	1	111	78	17	12	2	8
3	United States	3	1	1	1	98	100	16	16	2	8
4	Samoa	3	0	0	3	3	225	0	35	0	0

Source: World Rugby
(H) Host
Opponent
Result
Knockout stage
Opponent
Result
Australia
46–5
Quarter-finals
Scotland
40–8
New Zealand
19–34
Semi-finals
France
17–35

=== Canada ===
Canada began their World Cup campaign by beating Fiji 65–7. They also won their remaining two Pool B matches comfortably to qualify for the knockout stage. In their second match, they beat Wales 42–0, and in their final game they beat Scotland 40–19. In the quarter-finals, they faced Australia who had been runner's up in Pool A. Canada won the match comfortably 46–5. In a closely fought semi-final, Canada played the defending champions New Zealand, whom they defeated 19–34 to reach their second ever World Cup final.

=== England ===
England reached their ninth Women's Rugby World Cup final in a similar manner to Canada. In Pool A, England won their fixtures against the United States, Samoa, and Australia to finish at the top of the pool and qualify for the knockout stage. In the quarter-finals, they faced Scotland, who had finished second in Pool B behind Canada. England won the match 40–8. In the semi-final, England played France in a much closer match. England were eventual winners beating France 17–35.

== Match ==
=== Summary ===
Canada struck first in the 5th minute of the first half, when winger Asia Hogan-Rochester finished a counter-attack to give their side a 5–0 lead after captain Sophie de Goede missed the conversion. England replied three minutes later when Ellie Kildunne broke two tackles to score under the posts, with Zoe Harrison converting the try for a 5–7 lead. England's second try came from hooker Amy Cokayne in the 19th minute after a strong rolling maul, Harrison converted to make the score 5–14. The third English try, which was scored by number 8 Alex Matthews, came after a strong scrum in the Canadian half. Harrison converted the try to make the score 5–21. In the 33rd minute, Canada captain Sophie de Goede added three points to their tally from a penalty after an English infringement. This made the score 8–21. Cokayne grounded the ball again for England in the first half; however, the try was overturned by the referee as it was deemed England had obstructed the Canadian defenders in the maul. The first half finished 8–21.

England scored their fourth try in the tenth minute of the second half after second row Abbie Ward scored two phases after a dominant English scrum, Harrison's conversion missed after bouncing off the post. This try made the score 8–26. Shortly after the try, England prop Hannah Botterman was given a yellow card for an illegal tackle on Canadian back row Karen Paquin. Hogan-Rochester added Canada's second try after a quick move from their lineout, Sophie de Goede's conversion missed wide. England added their fifth and final try in the final after Alex Matthews went over for the second time, in the 69th minute; Harrison added the conversion. Canada applied pressure to England in the final ten minutes; however, they could not convert this into points and the match ended after England turned over the ball in the eightieth minute.

=== Details ===
27 September 2025
16:00 BST (UTC+1)

Canada	13–33	England
Try: Hogan-Rochester (2) 5' m, 53' m Pen: de Goede (1/1) 34'	Report	Try: Kildunne 8' c Cokayne 19' c Matthews (2) 26' c, 69' c Ward 50' m Con: Harrison (4/5) 8', 20', 27', 70'

Twickenham Stadium, London
Attendance: 81,885
Referee: Hollie Davidson (Scotland)

Canada
LP	1	McKinley Hunt	(substituted off) 41'
HK	2	Emily Tuttosi	(substituted off) 66'
TP	3	DaLeaka Menin	(substituted off) 69'
LL	4	Sophie de Goede
RL	5	Courtney O'Donnell	(substituted off) 53'
BF	6	Caroline Crossley	(substituted off) 66'
OF	7	Karen Paquin	(substituted off) 66'
N8	8	Fabiola Forteza
SH	9	Justine Pelletier	(substituted off) 53'
FH	10	Taylor Perry
LW	11	Asia Hogan-Rochester
IC	12	Alex Tessier (c)
OC	13	Florence Symonds
RW	14	Alysha Corrigan
FB	15	Julia Schell	(substituted off) 73'
Replacements:
HK	16	Gillian Boag	(substituted on) 66'
PR	17	Brittany Kassil	(substituted on) 41'
PR	18	Olivia DeMerchant	(substituted on) 69'
	19	Tyson Beukeboom	(substituted on) 53'
	20	Laetitia Royer	(substituted on) 66'
	21	Gabby Senft	(substituted on) 66'
	22	Olivia Apps	(substituted on) 53'
	23	Shoshanah Seumanutafa	(substituted on) 73'
Coach:
Kévin Rouet

England
LP	1	Hannah Botterman	(yellow card) 52'	(substituted off) 64'
HK	2	Amy Cokayne		(substituted off) 61'
TP	3	Maud Muir		(substituted off) 61'
LL	4	Morwenna Talling		(substituted off) 70'
RL	5	Abbie Ward		(substituted off) 70'
BF	6	Zoe Aldcroft (c)
OF	7	Sadia Kabeya
N8	8	Alex Matthews
SH	9	Natasha Hunt		(substituted off) 61'
FH	10	Zoe Harrison
LW	11	Jess Breach		(substituted off) 59'	(substituted on) 64'	(substituted off) 67'
IC	12	Tatyana Heard		(substituted off) 67'
OC	13	Megan Jones
RW	14	Abby Dow
FB	15	Ellie Kildunne
Replacements:
HK	16	Lark Atkin-Davies		(substituted on) 61'
PR	17	Kelsey Clifford		(substituted on) 64'
PR	18	Sarah Bern		(substituted on) 61'
	19	Rosie Galligan		(substituted on) 70'
	20	Maddie Feaunati		(substituted on) 70'
	21	Lucy Packer		(substituted on) 61'
	22	Holly Aitchison		(substituted on) 67'
	23	Helena Rowland		(substituted on) 67'
Coach:
John Mitchell

Player of the Match:
Sadia Kabeya (England)

Assistant referees:
Aimee Barrett-Theron (South Africa)
Clara Munarini (Italy)
Television match official:
Leo Colgan (Ireland)
Foul play review officer:
Matteo Liperini (Italy)

Notes:

- England won their third Rugby World Cup.
- The crowd of 81,885 was a record for a Women's rugby union match.
- The crowd of 81,885 was the second-highest for any Rugby World Cup final across the men's and women's tournaments.
- Hollie Davidson became the first referee to officiate two Women's Rugby World Cup finals.

=== Statistics ===
Overall
	Canada	England
Tries	2	5
Conversions	0	4
Penalties	1	0
Match stats
Territory	57%	43%
Possession	60%	40%
Attacking
Metres made	487	378
Offloads	12	4
Kicks from hand	19	22
Passes	209	109
Runs	175	90
Defending
Tackles	107	209
Tackle success	73%	81%
Turnovers won	5	5
Rucks won	127	61
Mauls won	6	2
Set pieces
Scrums won	3	8
Line-outs (won/lost)	(11/3)	(10/1)
Discipline
Yellow cards	0	1
Red cards	0	0
Penalties conceded	11	9
