= Gwenllian Pyrs =

Wales international rugby union footballer

- Born: 28 November 1997 (age 28) Bangor, Gwynedd, North Wales
- Height: 5 ft 8 in (1.73 m)
- Weight: 16 st 4 lb (103 kg; 228 lb)
- School: Ysgol Dyffryn Conwy; Ysgol Ysbyty Ifan
- Occupations: Rugby hub officer; Sheepdog breeder and trainer; Farmer
- Height and weight correct as of 14 April 2021

Rugby union career
- Position: Tighthead or loosehead prop
- Current team: Bristol Bears
Senior career
Years	Team	Apps	(Points)
	Scarlets Ladies		(0)
	RGC		(0)
	Caernarfon RFC		(0)
	Firwood Waterloo		(0)
2020–2022	Sale Sharks		(0)
2022–	Bristol Bears		(0)
International career
Years	Team	Apps	(Points)
2017–present	Wales	51	(30)

Gwenllian Pyrs (born 28 November 1997) is a Welsh rugby union player who plays loosehead prop for the Wales women's national rugby union team and Sale Sharks Women of Premier 15s. She made her debut for the Wales rugby union team in 2017 and has played in 15 matches for the national side. Pyrs has played for Scarlets, RGC Women, Caernarfon RFC and Firwood Waterloo at the club level. She works as a farmer, sheepdog breeder and trainer as well as a rugby hub officer for the Welsh Rugby Union while continuing her rugby career.

== Early life and career ==
Pyrs was born on 28 November 1997 in Bangor, Gwynedd, North Wales. She grew up in the Welsh-speaking community of Ysbyty Ifan in the River Conwy area in North West Snowdonia with nine other siblings. She is the daughter of the farmer and publican Eryl, who in 1980, was a founder member of Nant Conwy RFC.

Pyrs was educated at Ysgol Dyffryn Conwy and Ysgol Ysbyty Ifan. She has also taken part in sheepdog trials as a trainer from April to October, and trains and breeds sheepdogs. She works as a farmer as well as a rugby hub officer for the WRU and Urdd Chwaraeon at multiple schools in the Conwy Valley area while continuing her rugby career by commuting long hours three times a week to travel from Blaenau Ffestiniog to the National Centre of Excellence in Cardiff, South Wales for training. Pyrs is fluent in English and Welsh.

Whilst she played rugby union with her siblings on the family farm, she only began to take up the sport seriously when Nant Conwy formed an under-18s team in 2014. She worked as an apprentice for the Welsh Rugby Union and Urdd.

== International career ==
As of 2021, her Welsh Rugby Union (WRU) biography lists her height as 5 ft 8 in (1.73 m) and her weight at 16 stone 4 pounds (103 kg; 228 lb). She plays as loosehead prop and lists her female role model as Dyddgu Hywel.

Pyrs made her international debut for the Wales women's rugby union team, coming on as a second-half replacement in the national side's first round 2017 Women's Six Nations Championship match against Italy, which Wales won 20–8. Pyrs was named to the Wales side for the 2017 Women's Rugby World Cup.

In late January 2019, she sustained soft tissue damage and a cut on her head in a road accident at approximately 70 mph (110 km/h) while travelling with teammate Bethan Davies to Cardiff to train, ruling her out for the whole of the 2019 Women's Six Nations Championship. Pyrs recovered enough to play in the November 2019 international matches against Ireland in Dublin and was omnipresent in the Wales national team for the remainder of the year and the 2020 Women's Six Nations Championship.

Pyrs was selected in Wales squad for the 2021 Rugby World Cup in New Zealand.

She was named in the Welsh side for the 2025 Six Nations Championship in March. She was also selected in the squad to the Women's Rugby World Cup.

== Club career ==
At the club level, she has played for Scarlets, RGC 1404, Caernarfon RFC and Firwood Waterloo of the English Premier 15s. Pyrs was part of the RGC Women team who finished runner-up in the 2018 Regional Championship.

In late July 2020, she signed for Sale Sharks Women also of Premier 15s to expand their roster with experience in the team's front row. Pyrs made the move to Bristol Bears ahead of the 2022/2023 season after signing a professional contract with Wales in January.
