= Monk's Walk School =

Location
- Knightsfield; Welwyn Garden City, Hertfordshire, AL8 7NL; England
- Coordinates: 51°49′11″N 0°12′41″W

Information
- Type: Academy
- Established: 1964; 62 years ago
- Department for Education URN: 138632 Tables
- Ofsted: Reports
- Head teacher: Matt Grinyer
- Staff: 185
- Gender: Mixed
- Age: 11 to 18
- Enrolment: 1,324
- Houses: 4 (Bell, Durrell, Carson, Kroto)
- Colours: Blue and White
- Website: http://www.monkswalk.herts.sch.uk/

Monk's Walk School is a secondary school with academy status located on the outskirts of Welwyn Garden City, Hertfordshire, England. It opened in 1964 and became an Academy in 2012. The school's motto is: "Excellence for All".

The school's annual student intake is approximately 220 eleven- and twelve-year-olds of both sexes, with 1,324 students throughout the school. It also has approximately 185 teachers and staff.

== Alumni ==
- Hannah Botterman, Bristol Bears Women and England women's national rugby union team player
- David Button, West Bromwich Albion F.C. goalkeeper
- Alesha Dixon, singer, rapper, dancer, television personality and author
- Louise Fiddes, swimmer and Paralympics gold medallist
- Tom Lewis, golfer
- Jaguar Skills, DJ
- Lisa Snowdon, television and radio presenter and model
- Abubakar Salim, actor and video-game voice actor
