= Danny Longman =

English ultra-endurance athlete (born 1987)

Danny Longman (born 11 January 1987) is an English ultra-endurance athlete.

== 2017 Polar Row ==
As part of the 2017 Polar Row expedition, Longman rowed 1,251 nautical miles (1,440 mi; 2,317 km) across the Arctic Ocean with teammates Alex Gregory, Fiann Paul, Tyler Carnevale, Samuel Vie and Carlo Facchino. The 6-man team rowed from Longyearbyen, Svalbard to the Arctic ice pack (79'55'500 N) and then onto Jan Mayen. The Polar Row became the most record-breaking ocean row in history as well as the most record-breaking man-powered expedition. The wider expedition claimed over a dozen world records in total, with Longman being awarded 7 world records including being the first to row across the Greenland Sea" and reaching the northernmost latitude in a rowing vessel

== 2019 Lake District Swim Challenge ==
In August 2019, Longman set a new record for swimming the length of each of the 13 publicly-accessible lakes in the English Lake District (totalling 44 miles, 71 km), while cycling between the lakes. Longman began the human-powered journey at the Southern end of Ullswater with Tom Elliott. Three and a half days later, Longman completed Lake Windermere, England's longest lake, completing the challenge in 78 hours. Unfortunately, Elliott failed to complete the challenge.

== 2021 Lake District Swim Challenge ==
Following George Taplin's new record time of 59 hours, set in 2020 (driving rather than cycling between the lakes), Longman attempted the challenge again in August 2021. Longman set a new record for the 44 miles (71 km) route, with a time of 41 hours and 7 minutes.

== 2022 Black Sea Row ==
In June 2022, Longman rowed 1200 km (745 mi) across the Black Sea with teammates Gregg Botterman, Alex Dumbrava and Roland Burr. The 4-man crew rowed from Mangalia, Romania to Batumi, Georgia. The crew set a new world record for the fastest crossing of the Black Sea, with a time of 9 days, 18 hours and 5 minutes
