= Sale Sharks Women =

English rugby union club

- Union: Cheshire RFU
- Founded: 2020
- Ground: Heywood Road
- Coach: Tom Hudson
- Captain: Georgie Perris-Redding
- League: PWR
- 2025–26: 7th of 9

Sale Sharks Women are a women's rugby union club based in Sale, Greater Manchester, England. They were founded in 2020 as the women's team of Premiership Rugby side Sale Sharks. They currently compete in Premiership Women's Rugby, the highest division of women's rugby union in England.

== History ==
On 30 January 2020, Premiership Rugby side Sale Sharks announced that they would apply for place in the Premier 15s League ahead of the 2020–21 season, committing £1 million over a three-year period to their women's section. Their application was successful, and on 6 April, Sale Sharks Women were entered into the league alongside Exeter Chiefs Women, replacing Waterloo and Richmond.

Sale's application to be a part of the Premier 15s from the 2023/24 season onwards was initially rejected by the RFU. The club would later receive a conditional offer to fill one of the two remaining places in the league in February 2023.

At the end of the 2024/25 season, head coach Rachel Taylor and Louise Dalgliesh left the club's coaching setup, with new head coach Tom Hudson being appointed in February 2025 to prepare for the upcoming 25/26 PWR season.

== Home ground ==
Sale Sharks Women play their home matches at Heywood Road in Sale, Greater Manchester, and train at Carrington Lane, the Sale Sharks High Performance Centre owned by Sale FC. In March 2024, the club played their first standalone game at the men's home venue, the Salford Community Stadium, and this was followed up with a double header at the ground in December 2024.

== Season summaries ==
Season Summaries
	League				Cup	
Season	Competition	Final position	Points	Play-offs	Competition	Performance
2020–21	Allianz Premier 15s	9th	19	–	No competition	
2021–22	Allianz Premier 15s	9th	14	–	Allianz Cup	3rd in pool
2022–23	Allianz Premier 15s	7th	35	–	Allianz Cup	7th
2023–24	Allianz Premiership Women's Rugby	8th	13	–	Allianz Cup	6th
2024–25	Allianz Premiership Women's Rugby	9th	4	–	No competition	
2025-26	Premiership Women's Rugby	7th	38	–	PWR Cup	3rd in pool

Gold background denotes champions
Silver background denotes runners-up

== Current players ==
As of September 2025

Note: Flags indicate national union under World Rugby eligibility rules. Players may hold more than one non-World Rugby nationality.

Player	Position	Union
Amy Cokayne	Hooker	England
Scarlett Fielding	Hooker	England
Amelia Hyndman	Hooker	England
Annie Roué	Hooker	Singapore
Molly Wright	Hooker	Scotland
Leah Bartlett	Prop	Scotland
Sophie Benavent	Prop	England
Detysha Harper	Prop	England
Alice Iwanejko	Prop	England
Nick James	Prop	United States
Sophie Lewis	Prop	England
Gwenllian Pyrs	Prop	Wales
Marion Ridegway	Prop	England
Evie Roach	Prop	England
Iona Antwis	Lock	England
Sophie Blakemore	Lock	England
Polly Bowman	Lock	England
Trudy Cowan	Lock	England
Eva Donaldson	Lock	Scotland
Charlotte Fray	Lock	England
Erica Jarrell-Searcy	Lock	United States
Nina Moore	Lock	England
Molly Morrissey	Lock	England
Morwenna Talling	Lock	England
Alba Capell	Back row	Spain
Carmen Castellucci	Back row	Spain
Katie Childs	Back row	England
Trudy Cowan	Back row	England
Brittany Hogan	Back row	Ireland
Sharifa Kasolo	Back row	England
Katie Moore	Back row	England
Georgie Perris-Redding (cc)	Back row	United States
Kay Jarrell-Searcy	Back row	England

Player	Position	Union
Willow Bell	Scrum-half	England
Alicia Calton	Scrum-half	England
Shona Campbell	Scrum-half	Scotland
Izzy Green	Scrum-half	England
Olivia Ortiz	Scrum-half	United States
Amy Relf	Scrum-half	England
Holly Aitchison	Fly-half	England
Lizzie Duffy	Fly-half	Ireland
Katana Howard	Centre	United States
Vicky A Irwin	Centre	Ireland
Courtney Keight	Centre	Wales
Laura Perrin	Centre	England
Rachel Phillips	Centre	Scotland
Beatrice Rigoni	Centre	Italy
Evie Wills	Centre	Scotland
Frankie Harvey	Wing	England
Asia Hogan-Rochester	Wing	Canada
Rhona Lloyd	Wing	Scotland
Nikita Prothero	Wing	England
Holly Thorpe	Wing	England
Eva Wood	Wing	England
Isobel McGuire-Evans	Fullback	Scotland

== Notable players ==
The following are players which have represented their countries at the Rugby World Cup whilst playing for Sale Sharks:

Tournament	Players selected	England players	Other national team players
2021 (New Zealand)	11		Sara Tounesi (Italy) Sarah Law, Rachel McLachlan, Lisa Thomson, Molly Wright (Scotland) Catie Benson, Katana Howard, Nick James, Joanna Kitlinksi, Georgie Perris-Redding, Carly Waters (United States)
2025 (England)	16	Holly Aitchison, Amy Cokayne, Morwenna Talling	Beatrice Rigoni (Italy) Leah Bartlett, Eva Donaldson, Rhona Lloyd, Evie Wills, Molly Wright (Scotland) Alba Capell (Spain) Catie Benson, Erica Jarrell-Searcy, Georgie Perris-Redding, Olivia Ortiz (United States) Courtney Keight, Gwenllian Pyrs (Wales)

== Club staff ==
Role	Name
Head Coach	(England) Tom Hudson
Assistant Coach	(England) Mark Cueto
Defence Coach	(England) Charlie Beckett
Scrum Coach	(England) Luke Stratford
Lineout & Maul Coach	(England) Pete Anglesea

- As of 1 March 2025, for the 2025–26 season.
