= St Catherine's College, Wellington =

St Catherine's College
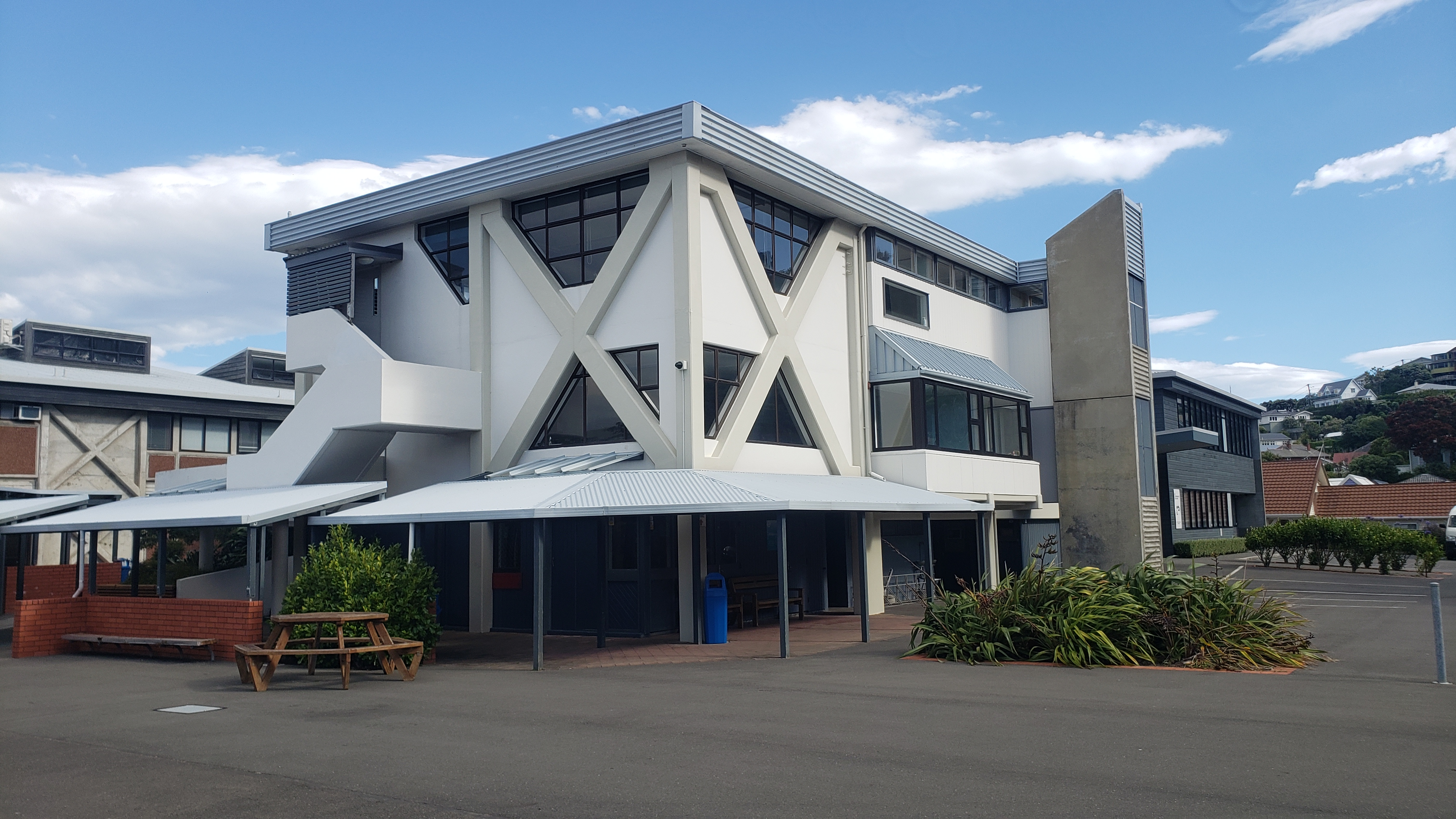
- The Marcia Wilson building at St Catherine's College

Location
- 14 Upper Bourke Street; Kilbirnie, Wellington; New Zealand; 41°19′04″S 174°47′34″E

Information
- Type: State-integrated, secondary
- Motto: Mercy and Wisdom
- Religious affiliation: Roman Catholic
- Established: 1919; 107 years ago
- Founders: Sisters of Mercy
- Ministry of Education Institution no.: 284
- Principal: Amélie Kelder
- Grades: 9–13
- Gender: Girls
- Enrolment: 218 (March 2026)
- Socio-economic decile: 6N
- Website: stcatherinescollege.school.nz

St Catherine's College, a Catholic secondary school for girls, operates in the Wellington suburb of Kilbirnie in New Zealand. The Sisters of Mercy founded St Catherine's in 1919 initially as a primary school before becoming a secondary school in 1950.

On 30 March 1983, St Catherine's College became an integrated school under the Private Schools Conditional Integration Act of 1975. The Board of Trustees was first elected in 1989 and is responsible for the governance of the College. In recent years a new multi-functional hall, called "Mercy Hall", has been opened as well as a Food Technology Centre, a Music Suite, and a new Design Arts Centre. The college also has a new administration area, a chapel, and specialist and multi functional teaching areas which were completed in September 2016.

== Enrolment ==
As a state-integrated school, the proprietors of St Catherine's College charge compulsory attendance dues to cover capital costs. For the 2025 school year, the attendance dues payable is $1,147 per year per student.

As of March 2026, St Catherine's College has a roll of 218 students, of which 23 (10.6%) identify as Māori.

As of 2026, the school has an Equity Index of 435, placing it amongst schools whose students have below average socioeconomic barriers to achievement (roughly equivalent to deciles 6 and 7 under the former socio-economic decile system).

== Principals ==
St Catherine's College principals include:

- Katrina Kerr-Bell (? - 2024)
- Amélie Kelder (2024–present)

== Notable alumnae ==
- Ana-Maria Afuie (born 1997) - rugby union player; Samoa internationally in rugby union and sevens.
- Joanah Ngan-Woo (born 1995) - rugby union player; plays Lock for the Black Ferns.

== Sources ==
- Ernest Richard Simmons, Brief history of the Catholic Church in New Zealand, Catholic Publications Centre, Auckland, 1978.
- Michael King, God's farthest outpost : a history of Catholics in New Zealand, Viking, Auckland 1997.
- Mary de Porres Flannigan R.S.M., Mercy comes to Wellington : a history of St. Mary’s College, St. Mary's College Board of Trustees, Wellington, 2000.
- Michael O'Meeghan S.M., Steadfast in hope : the story of the Catholic Archdiocese of Wellington 1850-2000, Dunmore press, Palmerston North, 2003.
