= Gregg Botterman =

English rugby union player

- Born: Gregg Botterman; 3 March 1968 (age 58) Welwyn Garden City, England
- Height: 1.80 m (5 ft 11 in)
- Weight: 98 kg (216 lb; 15 st 6 lb)
- Notable relative: Hannah Botterman (niece)

Rugby union career
- Position: Hooker
Amateur team(s)
Years	Team	Apps	(Points)
2004–2012	Old Albanian RFC	105	(185)
Senior career
Years	Team	Apps	(Points)
1995-99	Saracens	186	(25)
1999-2004	London Welsh	98	(55)
- Correct as of 15 June 2019
International career
Years	Team	Apps	(Points)
2005	Barbarian F.C.		
–	England A		

Gregg Botterman (born 3 March 1968) is a former rugby union hooker for premiership team Saracens, as well as London Welsh and Old Albanians.

He acted as the first-choice hooker during Saracens' entry into professionalism and played as Saracens won the Tetley's bitter cup. As a Saracens youth player, he received particular notes for playing against Orrell R.U.F.C. despite multiple broken ribs.

Botterman finished his professional rugby career in 2004, but remained involved in rugby with a 9-year stint as both player and part-time coach with Old Albanians. This stint would also include a game with the Barbarians against East Midlands, coming on as a replacement during a 48-17 victory.

His niece, Hannah Botterman is a Bristol and England prop, starting for both Saracens and England aged 18 after being introduced to rugby aged 4 by her uncle and aunt (Jane Everett - also an English prop).

In June 2022, Botterman rowed 1200 km (745 mi) across the Black Sea with teammates Danny Longman, Alex Dumbrava and Roland Burr. The 4-man crew rowed from Mangalia, Romania to Batumi, Georgia. The crew set a new world record for the fastest crossing of the Black Sea, with a time of 9 days, 18 hours and 5 minutes
