= Detysha Harper =

English rugby union player

- Born: 23 October 1998 (age 28) Salford, England
- Height: 1.75 m (5 ft 9 in)

Rugby union career
- Position: Prop
- Current team: Sale Sharks
Amateur team(s)
| Years | Team | Apps | (Points) |
| 2016–2017 | Eccles | | |
Senior career
| Years | Team | Apps | (Points) |
| 2017–2019 | Firwood Waterloo | | |
| 2019–2023 | Loughborough Lightning | | |
| 2023– | Sale Sharks | | |
International career
| Years | Team | Apps | (Points) |
| 2018 | England U20s | | |
| 2020– | England | 5 | (0) |
Medal record
Representing England
Women's rugby union
Rugby World Cup
| Silver medal – second place | 2021 New Zealand | Team competition |

Detysha Martin Harper (born 23 October 1998) is an English rugby union player. She represents the England women's national rugby union team internationally and plays for Sale Sharks at club level.

== International career ==
Harper got her first call-up to the England squad in November 2019, after playing for the Under 20s. She made her international debut playing for England in February 2020. She was called up as a replacement against Ireland at the 2020 Women's Six Nations Championship. England won the championship in late 2020 after delays due to the COVID-19 pandemic.

She was again called up to the England team during the 2021 Women's Six Nations Championships. She played in the final versus France, helping England to take the win and make her a two-time Six Nations champion. Not originally named in the squad for the COVID-delayed 2021 Rugby World Cup, Harper was called up after the first two pool games to replace the injured Laura Keates.

== Club career ==
She first played rugby at 15, joining her local club Eccles RFC. She went on to play in the Premier 15s for Loughborough Lightning. Following 4 years at Loughborough Harper signed for Sale Sharks Women on a two-year contract ahead of the 2023-24 Premiership Women's Rugby season.

== Early and personal life ==
Harper was born in Salford, Manchester. There was no rugby at her school, so she played rounders, netball and football. It wasn't until she was 15 that she first played, after asking why only her two brothers played rugby and not her. She then joined Eccles RFC, which had Under 15s and Under 18s girls' teams.

She is studying for a degree in Psychology at Loughborough University.

Harper is known in the England women's rugby team for plaiting other players' hair before matches.
