= Kittery Wagner-Ruiz =

US international rugby union player & coach

- Born: September 15, 1979 (age 47)

Rugby union career
- Position: Hooker
International career
| Years | Team | Apps | (Points) |
| 2007–2014 | United States | - | (0) |
National sevens team
| Years | Team | | Comps |
| 2008–2009 | United States | | |
Coaching career
- Years: Team
- 2025–: Boston Banshees (Head Coach)
- 2022–: Brown Bears (Assistant Coach)

Kittery Wagner-Ruiz (born September 15, 1979) is an American rugby union coach and former player. She competed for the United States at the 2010 and 2014 Rugby World Cup's. She was recently appointed as Boston Banshees first Head Coach for the inaugural season of the Women's Elite Rugby competition.

== Early life ==
Wagner-Ruiz graduated with a bachelor's degree in mathematics and psychology from SUNY Potsdam in 2003. She later earned her Master of Mathematics for Teachers from Boston University in 2007.

== Rugby career ==
=== Playing career ===
Wagner-Ruiz played on the USA women's national sevens team for two seasons and was selected to the 2009 Rugby World Cup Sevens training squad. She also represented the United States fifteens team at the 2010 and 2014 Rugby World Cup's.

=== Coaching career ===
In 2018, she was appointed as an Assistant Coach for Life University Women's Rugby team. She served as the Commissioner of the Women's Premier League for nearly three years from 2019 to 2022. She was hired as an assistant coach at Brown University for the women's rugby team in 2022.

She was named as Boston Banshees first Head Coach for the inaugural season of the Women's Elite Rugby competition.

== Personal life ==
In 2021, Wagner-Ruiz's wife, Kandis Ruiz, who was a United States Marine Corps Veteran lost her battle with cancer.
