= Ana-Maria Afuie =

Samoa international rugby union player

- Born: 17 April 1997 (age 29)
- Height: 163 cm (5 ft 4 in)
- Weight: 66 kg (146 lb; 10 st 6 lb)

Rugby union career
- Position(s): Halfback, Fullback, Wing
Senior career
Years	Team	Apps	(Points)
	Sunnybank RFC		(0)
Provincial / State sides
Years	Team	Apps	(Points)
2018–2022	Wellington Pride	30	(5)
Super Rugby
Years	Team	Apps	(Points)
2022	Hurricanes Poua	2	(0)
International career
Years	Team	Apps	(Points)
2020–Present	Samoa	9	(0)
National sevens team
Years	Team		Comps
2016–	Samoa		

Ana-Maria Afuie (born 17 April 1997) is a Samoan rugby union player. She represents Samoa internationally in rugby union and sevens. She plays at Halfback, Fullback and Wing.

== Personal life ==
Afuie attended St Catherine's College in Wellington and is of Samoan and Māori descent. Her father is Samoan, her grandmother is from Falefa and her grandfather is from Solosolo and Vailele. Her mother is from Tūrangi and is from Ngāti Tūwharetoa and Ngāti Porou iwi.

== Rugby career ==
Afuie plays provincially for Wellington Pride and club rugby for Marist St Pats. In 2020, she played for the Manusina XV's team against a Port Taranaki Women's Invitational XV. It was a trial match for selectors to finalise the Manusina team. She eventually made the Manusina team, they thrashed Tonga 40–0 and progressed to the Final Qualification Tournament for the 2021 Rugby World Cup.

Afuie was named in the Hurricanes Poua squad for the inaugural season of Super Rugby Aupiki.

In September 2024, she was selected in the Samoan side that competed at the WXV 3 competition in Dubai.

She was named in the Manusina side to the 2025 Women's Rugby World Cup in England.
