= 2014 Women's Rugby World Cup Pool A =

Pool A of the 2014 Women's Rugby World Cup is composed of 2010 World Cup runners-up England, Canada, Samoa and Spain.

== Canada vs Spain ==
1 August 2014

Canada	31-5	Spain
Tries:: Magali Harvey 18', 24', 35'; Mandy Marchak 51'; Cons: Magali Harvey 18', 24', 35', 51'; Pens: Magali Harvey 31'	Team Sheet	Tries:: Rocío García 78'

CNR, Marcoussis Pitch 2
Referee: (New Zealand) Nicky Inwood

FB	15	Elissa Alarie
RW	14	Magali Harvey
OC	13	Mandy Marchak
IC	12	Andrea Burk	(substituted off) 62'
LW	11	Julianne Zussman	(substituted off) 69'
FH	10	Emily Belchos
SH	9	Stephanie Bernier	(substituted off) 75'
N8	8	Kelly Russell (c)
OF	7	Karen Paquin
BF	6	Barbara Mervin	(substituted off) 26'
RL	5	Latoya Blackwood	(substituted off) 52'
LL	4	Maria Samson
TP	3	Hilary Leith	(substituted off) 52'
HK	2	Kim Donaldson	(substituted off) 52'
LP	1	Laura Russell
Replacements:
HK	16	Marie-Pier Pinault-Reid	(substituted in) 52'
PR	17	Olivia DeMerchant	(substituted in) 52' (yellow card) 60'
PR	18	Kayla Mack	(substituted in) 52'
LK	19	Jacey Murphy	(substituted in) 26'
FL	20	Julia Sugawara	(substituted in) 75'
SH	21	Brittany Benn	(substituted in) 62'
FH	22	Jessica Dovanne	(substituted in) 69'
Coach:
(Canada) Francois Ratier

FB	15	Marta Cabané	(substituted off) 64'
RW	14	Beatriz García
OC	13	Marina Bravo
IC	12	Patricia García
LW	11	Elisabeth Martínez
FH	10	Ana Vanessa Rial
SH	9	Bárbara Plà
N8	8	Ana Mª Aigneren (c)
OF	7	Ángela Del Pan	(substituted off) 74'
BF	6	Paula Medín
RL	5	María Ribera
LL	4	Lourdes Alameda	(substituted off) 64'
TP	3	Elena Redondo	(substituted off) 51'
HK	2	Aroa González
LP	1	Mª Carmen Sequedo	(substituted off) 35'
Replacements:
PR	16	Isabel Rico	(substituted in) 35'
PR	17	Rocío García	(substituted in) 51'
FL	18	Diana Gassó	(substituted in) 64'
FL	19	María Casado	(substituted in) 74'
FB	20	Irene Schiavon	(substituted in) 64'
FH	21	Helena Roca
CE	22	África Félez
Coach:
(Spain) Inés Etxegibel

== England vs Samoa ==
1 August 2014

England	65-3	Samoa
Tries:: Katherine Merchant 18', 21'; Lydia Thompson 30', 37'; Natasha Hunt 39', 57'; Kay Wilson 60', 78'; La Toya Mason 65'; Emily Scarratt 68'; Cons: Emily Scarratt 21', 30', 37', 57', 60', 68'; Pens: Emily Scarratt 12'	Team Sheet	Pens: Bella Milo 74'

Centre National de Rugby, Marcoussis, Essonne
Referee: (Australia) Amy Perrett

FB	15	Danielle Waterman
RW	14	Katherine Merchant	(substituted off) 42'
OC	13	Emily Scarratt
IC	12	Rachael Burford
LW	11	Lydia Thompson
FH	10	Katy McLean (c)	(substituted off) 59'
SH	9	Natasha Hunt	(substituted off) 59'
N8	8	Sarah Hunter
OF	7	Margaret Alphonsi
BF	6	Heather Fisher	(substituted off) 52'
RL	5	Tamara Taylor
LL	4	Jo McGilchrist	(substituted off) 52'
TP	3	Laura Keates	(substituted off) 55'
HK	2	Emma Croker	(substituted off) 55'
LP	1	Rochelle Clark
Replacements:
HK	16	Victoria Fleetwood	(substituted in) 55'
PR	17	Claire Purdy	(substituted in) 55'
LK	18	Rebecca Essex	(substituted in) 52'
FL	19	Marlie Packer	(substituted in) 52' (yellow card) 73'
SH	20	La Toya Mason	(substituted in) 59'
FH	21	Ceri Large	(substituted in) 59'
WG	22	Kay Wilson	(substituted in) 42'
Coach:
(England) Gary Street

FB	15	Soteria Pulumu	(red card) 12'
RW	14	Brenda Collins
OC	13	Merenaite Faitala-Mariner		(substituted off) 68'
IC	12	Mary-Ann Collins
LW	11	Justine Luatua		(substituted off) 42'
FH	10	Bella Milo
SH	9	Tulua Leuluaialii		(substituted off) 52'
N8	8	Helen Collins	(yellow card) 49'
OF	7	Rita Lilii
BF	6	Sally Kaokao
RL	5	Cynthia Taala (c)
LL	4	Italia Tipelu		(substituted off) 62'
TP	3	Ala Leavasa-Bakulich		(substituted off) 52'
HK	2	Sharlene Fagalilo
LP	1	Tessa Wright		(substituted off) 66'
Replacements:
FL	17	Cynthia Apineru		(substituted in) 66'
HK	18	Laura Levi
LK	19	Juliana Saumani Sua		(substituted in) 62'
SH	20	Roseanne Leaupepe		(substituted in) 52'
WG	21	Taliilagi Mefi		(substituted in) 76'
FB	22	Mele Leuluaialii		(substituted in) 68'
PR	26	Ginia Muavae		(substituted in) 52'
Coach:
(Samoa) Euini Lale Faumuina

== Canada vs Samoa ==
5 August 2014

Canada	42-7	Samoa
Tries: Mandy Marchak 12'; Brittany Waters 22', 66'; Elissa Alaire 28'; Stepanie Bernier 42'; Andrea Burk 80+1'; Cons: Magali Harvey 12', 22', 28', 42, 66'; Andrea Burk 80+1'	Team Sheet	Tries: Ginia Muavae 54'; Cons: Bella Milo 54'

CNR, Marcoussis Pitch 2
Referee: (Ireland) Helen O'Reilly

FB	15	Elissa Alarie
RW	14	Magali Harvey		(substituted off) 68'
OC	13	Mandy Marchak		(substituted off) 53'
IC	12	Andrea Burk
LW	11	Brittany Waters	(yellow card) 73' to 80'
FH	10	Emily Belchos		(substituted off) 60'
SH	9	Stephanie Bernier
N8	8	Kelly Russell (c)
OF	7	Karen Paquin		(substituted off) 58'
BF	6	Jacey Murphy
RL	5	Latoya Blackwood		(substituted off) 35'	(substituted in) 41'	(substituted off) 51'	(substituted in) 58'
LL	4	Maria Samson		(substituted off) 55'
TP	3	Olivia DeMerchant		(substituted off) 51'
HK	2	Mary Jane Kirby		(substituted off) 51'
LP	1	Marie-Pier Pinault-Reid
Replacements:
HK	16	Hilary Leith		(substituted in) 51'
PR	17	Laura Russell		(substituted in) 51'
PR	18	Tyson Beukeboom		(substituted in) 35'	(substituted off) 41'	(substituted in) 51'
LK	19	Kayla Mack		(substituted in) 55'
FL	20	Julianne Zussman		(substituted in) 60'
SH	21	Amanda Thornborough		(substituted in) 53'
FH	22	Jessica Dovanne		(substituted in) 68'
Coach:
(Canada) Francois Ratier

FB	15	Brenda Collins	(substituted off) 76'
RW	14	Taliilagi Mefi
OC	13	Merenaite Faitala-Mariner
IC	12	Mary-Ann Collins	(substituted off) 24'
LW	11	Justine Luatua
FH	10	Bella Milo
SH	9	Tulua Leuluaialii	(substituted off) 55'
N8	8	Helen Collins
OF	7	Vicki Campbell	(substituted off) 69'
BF	6	Rita Lilii	(yellow card) 14' to 24'
RL	5	Cynthia Taala (c)
LL	4	Italia Tipelu	(substituted off) 61'
TP	3	Ala Leavasa-Bakulich	(substituted off) 51'
HK	2	Sharlene Fagalilo
LP	1	Tessa Wright	(substituted off) 75'
Replacements:
PR	16	Cynthia Apineru	(substituted in) 75'
FL	17	Sally Kaokao	(substituted in) 69'
LK	18	Apaula Kerisiano	(substituted in) 61'
PR	19	Ginia Muavae	(substituted in) 51'
N8	21	Mele Leulauialii	(substituted in) 24'
FB	22	Tile Start	(substituted in) 76'
SH	26	Roseanne Leaupepe	(substituted in) 55'
Coach:
(Samoa) Euini Lale Faumuina

== England vs Spain ==
5 August 2014

England	45-5	Spain
Tries: Kay Wilson 17'; Danielle Waterman 38'; Laura Keates 45'; Claire Allan 50'; Marlie Packer 55', 79'; Cons:Emily Scarratt 17', 38', 45', 50', 55', 79'; Pens:Emily Scarratt 30'	Team Sheet	Tries: Marina Bravo

CNR, Marcoussis Pitch 1
Referee: (New Zealand) Jess Beard

== Spain vs Samoa ==
5 August 2014

Spain	41–5	Samoa
	Team Sheet

CNR, Marcoussis Pitch 2
Referee: (England) Claire Hodnett

== England vs Canada ==
9 August 2014

England	13–13	Canada
Tries: Sarah Hunter 56'; Cons: Emily Scarratt 56'; Pens: Emily Scarratt 8', 40'	Team Sheet	Tries: Karen Paquin 14'; Kayla Mack 44'; Pens: Magali Harvey 73'

CNR, Marcoussis Pitch 1
Referee: (Australia) Amy Perrett
