= Cassidy Bargell =

US international rugby union player

- Born: December 28, 1999 (age 26)

Rugby union career
- Position: Scrum-half
Senior career
Years	Team	Apps	(Points)
2025–	Boston Banshees		
International career
Years	Team	Apps	(Points)
2024–	United States	12	(5)

Cassidy Bargell (born December 28, 1999) is an American rugby union player. She competed for the United States in the 2025 Women's Rugby World Cup. She plays for the Boston Banshees in the Women's Elite Rugby competition.

== Early career ==
Bargell grew up in Colorado and took part in several sports such as skiing, gymnastics, basketball, and volleyball before she found rugby in eighth grade.

In 2018, she joined the national school rugby sevens program. She went to study biology at Harvard University, which she chose in part for the quality of its rugby program. She won a national university title there in 2019.

Bargell overcame ulcerative colitis, she had numerous abdominal surgeries and now lives with an ostomy. She later tore her cruciate ligaments and missed the end of her last season with the Harvard Crimson. In 2023, she was among the players nominated for the MA Sorensen Award, an award that recognizes the best college player of the year.

== Rugby career ==
In 2024, she played for Beantown RFC in the Women's Premier League. She then made her international debut for the United States in March against South Africa. By the end of summer 2024, she has two caps for the United States team when she is selected for the WXV tournament in Canada.

In 2025, she played the first season of Women's Elite Rugby with the Boston Banshees and was then called up to the Eagles for the Pacific Four Series. She was subsequently named in the United States squad for the 2025 Women's Rugby World Cup in England.
