= Sariah Ibarra =

US international rugby union player

- Born: September 19, 2005 (age 21)
- Height: 162 cm (5 ft 4 in)
- Weight: 61 kg (134 lb; 9 st 8 lb)

Rugby union career
- Position: Wing
International career
Years	Team	Apps	(Points)
2024–	United States	8	(0)
National sevens team
Years	Team		Comps
2024–	United States 7s		

Sariah Ibarra (born September 19, 2005) is an American rugby union player. She represented the United States at the 2025 Women's Rugby World Cup. She has also played for the United States women's national sevens team.

== Rugby career ==
Ibarra grew up in Huntington Beach, California, she discovered rugby after her brother who played American football was encouraged by her father to take up rugby to improve his tackling technique. She started playing for Belmont Shore RFC.

As a high school student, she went to New Zealand and enrolled at the prestigious Hamilton Girls' High School. She was selected for the national under-18 rugby sevens team, coached by former Black Fern, Kristina Sue. At the time, she dreamt of becoming a Black Fern.

Back in the United States, she joined the high-level federal program and toured Brazil with the Falcons (the national B team). In July 2024, she was selected for the Eagles tour of Japan, where she earned her first two international caps at just 19 years old. However, she was not selected for the WXV.

After graduating from high school, she received scholarship offers from several universities (Harvard, Dartmouth, Princeton), but chose to sign a contract with USA Rugby to participate in the 2024–2025 SVNS with the United States women's rugby sevens team. She made her international sevens debut for the United States during the Dubai tournament on November 30, 2024.

Throughout these years, she benefited from the support of her high school, Los Alamitos, which demonstrated great flexibility in allowing her to balance rugby and her studies. Her first sevens season culminated in the Cape Town tournament, where her team reached the final against New Zealand.

In March 2025, she returned to the 15-a-side game to compete in the Pacific Four Series. She was named in the Eagles squad for the 2025 Women's Rugby World Cup in England.
