= Erica Jarrell =

US international rugby union player

- Born: February 25, 1999 (age 27)
- Height: 178 cm (5 ft 10 in)
- Weight: 77 kg (170 lb; 12 st 2 lb)
- Notable relative: Dudley Herschbach (grandfather)

Rugby union career
- Position: Lock
- Current team: Sale Sharks Women
Amateur team(s)
Years	Team	Apps	(Points)
	Beantown RFC		(0)
Senior career
Years	Team	Apps	(Points)
2024-	Sale Sharks Women		(0)
International career
Years	Team	Apps	(Points)
2023–	United States	23	(20)

Erica Jarrell-Searcy (born February 25, 1999) is an American rugby union player. She plays lock (rugby union) for Sale Sharks in the Premiership Women's Rugby competition and for the United States at an international level.

== Rugby career ==
Jarrell was named in an Eagles Under-20 side that competed in a Women's Under-20 Tri-Nations Cup against Canada and England in 2019. She featured in both games at Lock.

She graduated from Harvard in 2021, she was a co-captain of the women's rugby team. In 2022, She was selected in the Eagles squad for the postponed 2021 Rugby World Cup in New Zealand.

Jarrell made her international debut against New Zealand on July 14, 2023, at Ottawa.

She signed for Sale Sharks Women in the Premiership Women's Rugby competition in January 2024.

In 2025, she played in the Eagles 33–39 loss to Japan in Los Angeles on April 26, 2025. On July 17, she was selected for the Eagles side to the 2025 Women's Rugby World Cup that will be held in England.

== Personal life ==
Jarrell is a 2017 graduate of Buckingham Browne & Nichols School. Her grandfather is Nobel Prize in Chemistry winner Dudley Herschbach.
