= Holly Aitchison =

Great Britain & England international rugby union footballer

- Born: 13 September 1997 (age 29) Southport, England
- Height: 1.75 m (5 ft 9 in)
- Weight: 69 kg (152 lb)

Rugby union career
- Position(s): Centre, Fly-half
- Current team: Sale Sharks Women
Senior career
Years	Team	Apps	(Points)
2020–2023	Saracens		
2023-2025	Bristol Bears		
2025-	Sale Sharks		
International career
Years	Team	Apps	(Points)
2021–	England	44	(129)
National sevens teams
Years	Team		Comps
2017–	England		
2021	Great Britain		
- Correct as of 1 August 2021
Medal record
Women's rugby union
Representing England
Rugby World Cup
Gold medal – first place	2025 England	Team competition
Silver medal – second place	2021 New Zealand	Team competition

Holly Nielle Aitchison (born 13 September 1997) is an English rugby union player for Sale Sharks Women in Premiership Women's Rugby. She has played international representative rugby at the World Cup, Olympic Games, and Six Nations Championships.

== Early life ==
Born in Southport, she attended St Peter's Primary School and Range High School in Formby where she was coached by Gill Burns. Aitchison is the daughter of former England Saxon and rugby coach Ian Aitchison.

== Career ==
She played for Waterloo Ladies as a junior and Gloucester-Hartpury and Lichfield Ladies. She was a two-time U18 Rugby Europe Women's Sevens champion with England and a member of the squad that lifted the Challenge Trophy at the 2018 Rugby World Cup Sevens.

In September 2020 she joined Saracens Women. She was said to have played a key role as Saracens won the Premier 15s title in 2021–22, and played all 80 minutes of the 43–21 victory over Exeter Chiefs in the final.

On 1 July 2023, Aitchison was announced as signing for Bristol Bears Women.

On 4 June 2025 Sale Sharks Women announced that Aitchison had signed for the club ahead of the 2025–26 Premiership Women's Rugby season.

== International career ==
In 2021 she played for the Great Britain Rugby Sevens squad in the delayed 2020 Summer Games in Tokyo, where they finished fourth.

In October 2021, she scored a try on her debut for the England 15s team. She was named in the England squad for the delayed 2021 Rugby World Cup held in New Zealand in October and November 2022. She was named in the starting 15 for the World Cup final against New Zealand.

For the 2023 Six Nations Championship, Aitchison reverted to starting at fly-half for England. The England side completed a grand-slam in the tournament. In May 2023, she was shortlisted for the ‘best player’ award at the 2023 Six Nations.

On 17 March 2025, she was called into England's squad for the Women's Six Nations Championship. In July 2025, she was named in the England squad for the 2025 Rugby World Cup.

She was named at fly-half for her 50th England cap in the 2026 WXV opening game against Australia on 12 September 2026.

== Honours ==
England

- Women's Rugby World Cup
  - (gold) Champion (1): 2025

== Personal life ==
Aitchison was previously in a relationship with fellow rugby union player Hannah Botterman.
