= Hannah Botterman =

England international rugby union player

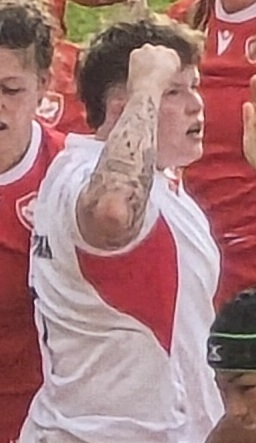
- 2025 Women's Rugby World Cup final
- Born: 8 June 1999 (age 27)
- Height: 1.70 m (5 ft 7 in)
- Weight: 103 kg (227 lb)
- Notable relative: Gregg Botterman (uncle) Jane Everett (Aunt)

Rugby union career
- Position: Prop
- Current team: Bristol
Amateur team(s)
Years	Team	Apps	(Points)
2003–2011	Datchworth		
2011–2017	Welwyn		
Senior career
Years	Team	Apps	(Points)
2017–2023	Saracens		
2023–	Bristol		
International career
Years	Team	Apps	(Points)
2017–	England	62	(55)
2018	England U20s		
Medal record
Representing England
Women's rugby union
Rugby World Cup
Gold medal – first place	2025 England	Team competition
Silver medal – second place	2021 New Zealand	Team competition

Hannah Ruby Botterman (born 8 June 1999) is an English rugby union prop who represents Bristol Bears Women in club rugby and the England national team. Botterman made her debut in 2017 against Canada.

== International career ==
In 2017, Botterman was called up to the England national women's rugby team after an impressive season at her club, Saracens. She made her debut versus Canada.

Botterman played again for England in the 2019 Super Series San Diego and was awarded a full time professional contract by the Rugby Football Union for the 2019/20 season.

She was part of the Grand Slam winning 2019 Women's Six Nations Championship team.

She was named in the England squad for the delayed 2021 Rugby World Cup held in New Zealand in October and November 2022.

On 17 March 2025, she was called into the Red Roses side for the Six Nations Championship. She was named in England's squad for the Women's Rugby World Cup in England.

== Club career ==
Aged 18 she made her debut for Saracens Women during the 2017/18 season. She has been instrumental in Saracens winning back-to-back Tyrell Premier 15s titles, scoring the winning try in the 2017/18 final against Harlequins Women.

She has represented Hertfordshire, London & South East and England Under-18s.

== Early life and education ==
Botterman began playing rugby aged four for Datchworth RFC and after eight years moved to Welwyn RFC. Both her parents were involved in the game, playing for Datchworth, as were other members of her extended family: her aunt Jane Everett was also an England international prop. Her uncle Greg Botterman played for England A and Saracens F.C.

She was educated at Monk's Walk School in Welwyn Garden City, Hertfordshire. At 16, she attended Hartpury College.

Before she was offered a full-time rugby contract, Botterman was a painter and decorator, and a waitress at Harvester. She plays recreational golf.

== Personal life ==
Since November 2025 Botterman has been confirmed to be in a relationship with Welsh rugby union international Georgia Evans. Botterman was previously in a relationship with England teammate Holly Aitchison. Botterman is a full-on lesbian.

== Honours ==
England

- Women's Rugby World Cup
  - (gold) Champion (1): 2025
