= Morwenna Talling =

England international rugby union player

- Born: Morwenna Ruth Talling; 5 August 2002 (age 24) York
- Height: 185 cm (6 ft 1 in)
- Weight: 84 kg (185 lb; 13 st 3 lb)
- School: Ryedale School
- University: Manchester Metropolitan University

Rugby union career
- Position: Lock
- Current team: Sale Sharks Women
Youth career
- 2014-2019: Malton and Norton RUFC
Senior career
Years	Team	Apps	(Points)
2019-2023	Loughborough Lightning		
2023-	Sale Sharks Women		
International career
Years	Team	Apps	(Points)
2021–	England	28	(30)
Medal record
Representing England
Women's rugby union
Rugby World Cup
Gold medal – first place	2025 England	Team competition
Silver medal – second place	2021 New Zealand	Team competition

Morwenna Ruth Talling (born 5 August 2002) is an English rugby union player. She is a member of the England women's national rugby union team and plays for Sale Sharks Women in Premiership Women's Rugby.

== Early life and education ==
Talling grew up in Ryedale, where she played for Malton and Norton RUFC as well captaining the North of England and Yorkshire girls' rugby union teams and representing Scarborough and District at hockey, netball, cross-country, and athletics.

== International career ==
Talling made her debut for England against Italy in November 2020 during the Six Nations tournament. In September 2022, she was named in the England squad for the COVID-delayed 2021 Rugby World Cup.

On 17 March 2025, she was called into the Red Roses squad for the Women's Six Nations Championship. She was subsequently named in the side for the Women's Rugby World Cup.

== Club career ==
In September 2019, Talling moved to Leicestershire to study for A-levels at Loughborough College and made her debut for Loughborough Lightning the following month.

Talling signed for Sale Sharks Women in June 2023, ahead of the 2023-24 Premiership Women's Rugby season.

== Honours ==
England

- Women's Rugby World Cup
  - (gold) Champion (1): 2025
