= Waterloo Ladies =

- Full name: Firwood Waterloo Ladies Football Club
- Union: RFUW
- Founded: 1989

Waterloo Ladies Rugby Football Club, known for sponsorship reasons as Firwood Waterloo Ladies Rugby Football Club, is a women's rugby union club based in Blundellsands, Merseyside, England. They are the women's team of Waterloo FC. They were established in 1989 by England national women's rugby union team player Gill Burns. In 2020 they lost their place in the Premier 15s after their re-applications were rejected.

== History ==
Waterloo Ladies were founded in 1989 by Gill Burns as a way for local women to be able to play rugby in their hometown. By 2001, Waterloo Ladies were playing in the Women's Premiership. A large number of Waterloo Ladies' players took part in the 2006 Women's Rugby World Cup, which meant that Waterloo Ladies were unable to put out strong team leading to relegation from the Women's Premiership. Despite this, they became the most successful women's rugby club in Merseyside. In 2012, the club's name was changed to Firwood Waterloo following a sponsorship deal with a Liverpool based timber merchant, which included all of the club's teams including the Ladies. In 2013, Waterloo Ladies joined the Sale Sharks men's team for training. In 2016, Waterloo Ladies were champions of Championship 1 North.

In 2017, Waterloo Ladies were selected as one of ten successful bids for a franchise in the new Women's Super Rugby competition, later renamed Premier 15s, designed to replace the Women's Premiership due to a reconstitution of women's rugby in England. The decision was welcomed by Lichfield Ladies who congratulated Waterloo Ladies on their return, despite Lichfield being controversially omitted from the new league.
