= Emma Moran =

Northern-Irish comedy writer

- Education: Enniskillen Collegiate Grammar School; University College London (BA); University of Manchester (MA)
- Notable work: Extraordinary

Comedy career
- Years active: 2017–
- Medium: Television, theatre
- Genre: Comedy

Emma Moran is an Irish screenwriter and comedian from County Fermanagh in Northern Ireland. She is best known as the creator and writer of 2023 Hulu comedy series Extraordinary.

== Early life ==
From Killadeas, a village a few miles north of Enniskillen in County Fermanagh, Moran attended Enniskillen Collegiate Grammar School. She moved to London to complete an undergraduate degree at the University College London. Moran relocated for her post-grad degree, graduating with an MA in screenwriting from the University of Manchester in 2020.

== Career ==
Moran started performing stand-up comedy whilst at University and performed a sketch show Galpals at the 2017 Edinburgh Fringe Festival with comedy partner Sarah King.

Moran wrote and produced comedy sketches for digital publisher The Hook and became part of the BBC's Comedy Room development group in 2019, following an application process in which she was selected from 2,728 received scripts. There, she was involved in writing for BBC comedy shows such as Have I Got News for You and Newsjack. She has guested on long-running BBC Radio 4 show Loose Ends, hosted by Clive Anderson and Emma Freud. Moran has also appeared as a guest on The Ryan Tubridy Show, a programme that was formerly broadcast on RTÉ Radio 1, part of RTÉ, the state broadcaster of the Republic of Ireland.

=== Extraordinary ===
Moran started writing the screenplay that became the Disney+ television series Extraordinary during her master's degree in Manchester. Initially, it was a flat share comedy without any superhero elements. After starting the script in 2020 she continued writing it during the lockdowns of the COVID-19 pandemic and called it her "lockdown baby". With the script she won the inaugural Thousand Films scriptwriting competition.

The script was optioned by Star Original for Disney+ in 2021 and executive producer Sally Woodward Gentle said "Emma Moran is Extraordinary. An extraordinary new writer with a brilliantly distinctive and ingenious voice." The first series of Extraordinary was released in January 2023 and was renewed for a second series that same month. Moran's work on the series has been praised by numerous critics. Time said "remember the name Emma Moran. She has achieved what once seemed impossible: She’s created a superhero comedy that’s actually funny.” Lucy Mangan in The Guardian described the first series as having “enough heart and good, unexpected one-liners..to keep you coming back for more and to mark 28-year-old debut writer Emma Moran as one to watch". Mike Hale in The New York Times said that Moran kept "various strains combined in a charming and consistently amusing fashion" adding "It helps that Moran’s comic sensibility is dirty-mouthed and dirty-minded in a completely disarming, sometimes painfully funny way". The series won Best Scripted Comedy at the Royal Television Society Programme Awards in March 2024. That month, the series was also nominated in the “Best Scripted Comedy” category at the 2024 British Academy Television Awards. The series was nominated for Best Comedy at the 2024 Broadcasting Press Guild Awards.

=== Other projects ===
In August 2024, she was announced to be adapting the Bella Mackie novel How to Kill Your Family for Netflix with Anya Taylor-Joy attached to the lead role.

In March 2025, it was announced that she would be writing and starting in a six-part BBC One Cold War spy drama Honey, which premiered on 14 November 2026.
