= Orlando Norman =

Australian actor

- Born: Adelaide, Australia
- Occupations: Actor, Filmmaker
- Years active: 2020–present

Orlando Norman is an Australian actor and filmmaker.

== Career ==
From Adelaide, Australia, Norman won the Boden International Film Festival award for Best Actor for his short film Dipsomaniac (2021), which he wrote and produced as well as appeared, and shot in South Australia. Norman was credited as an actor and script writer on collaborative Scottish dark comedy film Tummy Monster. The film was nominated for Best Film at the 2025 British Academy Scotland Awards. He appeared alongside Madelyn Cline in romantic drama film The Map That Leads to You (2025). He portrayed the character Cruz in young adult romantic drama film Your Fault: London (2026). He has an upcoming role in musical drama film And Out Comes the Wolf.

Norman's television credits include Netflix drama series Eric (2024). That year, he could also be seen in the second series of British comedy horror Wreck. In 2025, Norman joined the cast of Apple TV+ science-fiction drama series Silo in the second series, as Rick, a young adult hiding in Silo 17, discovered by Juliette (Rebecca Ferguson). Norman has a role in 2026 coming-of-age Netflix series The Body. In August 2026, he joined Anya Taylor Joy in the cast of Netflix series How to Kill Your Family.

== Filmography ==
=== Film ===
Key
†	Denotes films that have not yet been released

Year	Title	Role	Notes
2020	Pretty Boy	Kevin	Short film
2021	Boys on Film 21: Beautiful Secret	Kevin	
2021	Hustlers	Rabbit	Short film. Also writer
2021	Dipsomanic	Ted	Short film. Also director, writer and producer
2023	In the Dark	Daniel	Short film
2024	Sebastian	Theo	
2024	Tummy Monster	Tummy	Also writer
2025	Heavyweight	Diego	
2025	Una Notte	Rory	Short film
2025	The Map That Leads to You	Reef	
2026	Flavia	Sgt. Graves	
2026	Your Fault: London	Cruz	
2026	And Out Comes the Wolf †		

=== Television ===
Key
†	Denotes television productions that have not yet been released

Year	Title	Role	Notes
2024	Wreck	Ben Matthews	5 episodes
2024	Eric	Ricardo	4 episodes
2025-present	Silo	Rick	4 episodes
2026	The Body	Steven Maxwell	8 episodes
TBA	How to Kill Your Family †	TBA	
