= 2026–27 Celtic Challenge =

Women's rugby union competition in Europe

- Countries: Ireland; Wales; Scotland
- Number of teams: 6
- Matches played: 33

Official website
- celticrugbycomp.com

The 2026–27 Celtic Challenge is the fifth season of the Celtic Challenge, a cross-border women's rugby union competition with teams from Ireland, Wales, and Scotland. The six team tournament features a full double round robin fixture series, with each team playing the others both home and away. As with last yeaar, the competition will include a single elimination play-off with semi-finals and a grand final to be held at the home of the finalist with the highest seed from the league season.

Wolfhounds enter the competition as three–time defending champions.

== Teams and locations ==
There have been no team changes from the 2025–26 season.

Team	Country	Coach / Director of Rugby	Affiliation
Brython Thunder	Wales	Ashley Beck	Scarlets, Ospreys
Clovers	Ireland	Denis Fogarty	Munster, Connacht
Edinburgh Rugby	Scotland	Claire Cruikshank	Edinburgh Rugby
Glasgow Warriors	Scotland	Lindsey Smith	Glasgow Warriors
Gwalia Lightning	Wales	Catrina Nicholas-McLaughlin	Cardiff, Dragons RFC
Wolfhounds	Ireland	Neill Alcorn	Leinster, Ulster

== Table ==
Pos	Team	Pld	W	D	L	PF	PA	PD	TF	TA	TB	LB	Pts	Qualification
1	(Ireland) Wolfhounds (Q)	0	0	0	0	0	0	0	0	0	0	0	0	Play-offs
2	(Ireland) Clovers (Q)	0	0	0	0	0	0	0	0	0	0	0	0	Play-offs
3	(Wales) Gwalia Lightning (Q)	0	0	0	0	0	0	0	0	0	0	0	0	Play-offs
4	(Wales) Brython Thunder (Q)	0	0	0	0	0	0	0	0	0	0	0	0	Play-offs
5	(Scotland) Glasgow Warriors	0	0	0	0	0	0	0	0	0	0	0	0	
6	(Scotland) Edinburgh Rugby	0	0	0	0	0	0	0	0	0	0	0	0	

First match(es) will be played: 20 December 2025. Source: Celtic Challenge
Rules for classification: Four points for a win, two points for a draw. One bonus point for scoring four or more tries in a match; one bonus point for losing by a margin of seven or less.

== Match grid ==
The following are the fixtures and results for the 2026–27 Celtic Challenge regular season:

Home \ Away		BRY	CLO	EDI	GLA	GWA	WOL
(Wales)	Brython Thunder	—	–	–	–	–	–
(Ireland)	Clovers	–	—	–	–	–	–
(Scotland)	Edinburgh Rugby	–	–	—	–	–	–
(Scotland)	Glasgow Warriors	–	–	–	—	–	–
(Wales)	Gwalia Lightning	–	–	–	–	—	–
(Ireland)	Wolfhounds	–	–	–	–	–	—

Colours: Green: home team win; Yellow: draw; Red: away team win; Blue: upcoming matches

== Regular season ==
The fixtures were announced in October 2026. The first round of fixtures will take place on 5 December 2025. All times shown are local times.

== Play-offs ==
As with the previous season, the Celtic Challenge will have play-offs to crown a champion, with the top four teams in the regular season advancing to semi-finals, followed by a grand final hosted by the highest remaining seed.

Semi-finals
13 March 2027 – TBD
TBD
TBD	-
13 March 2027 – TBD
TBD
-

Final
27 March 2027 – TBD
TBD
TBD

=== Semi-finals ===
13 March 2027

v

13 March 2027

v

=== Final ===
27 March 2027

v

== Try scorers ==
The top try scorers in the competition were as follows:

== Discipline ==
The bans incurred during the competition were as follows:
