= David Shields (actor) =

British actor

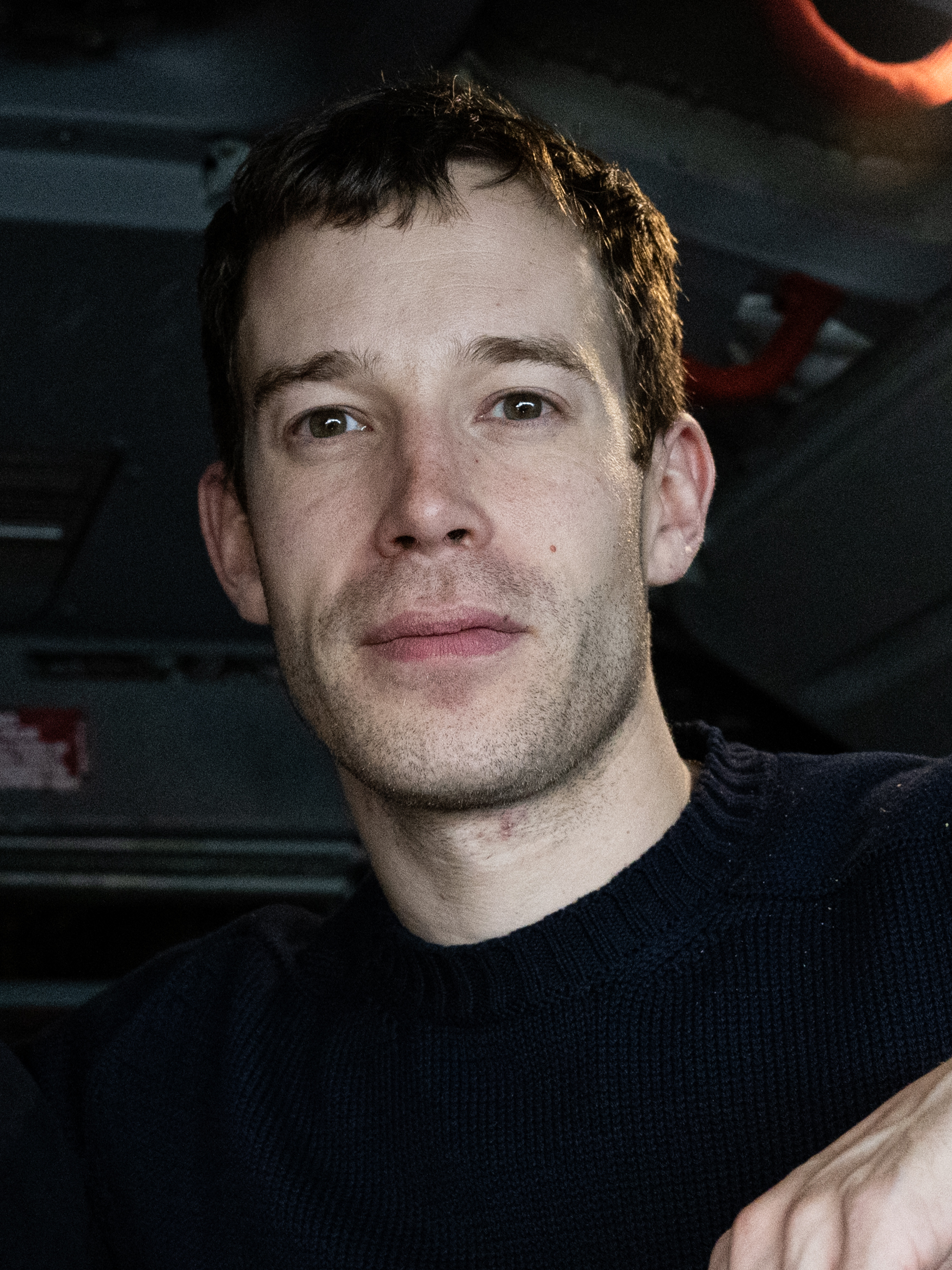
Shields in 2024

David Shields is a British actor.

== Early life ==
Born in Derby, Shields was initially studying theology at the University of Oxford, where he earned his degree, before he began studying acting at the Royal Welsh College of Music & Drama, graduating in 2017.

== Career ==
In 2023, he was revealed as part of the cast for the Apple TV+ miniseries Masters of the Air, and also appeared in the Black Mirror episode "Demon 79".

In 2024, Shields began appearing in the play Punch. It premiered at the Nottingham Playhouse on 4 May 2024, with Shields continuing in his role for the play's runs at the Young Vic beginning on 1 March 2025, and at the Apollo Theatre from 22 September to 29 November 2025. For his performance, Shields was nominated for the Laurence Olivier Award for Best Actor.

In July 2025, Shields joined the cast of Dear England, a BBC television adaptation of the stage play. Shields plays footballer Jordan Henderson.

== Acting credits ==
=== Film ===
Year	Title	Role	Notes
2015	The Bad Education Movie	The Shep	
2016	Una	Man in Nightclub	
2019	Judy	Photographer	
2019	Two Heads Creek	Man in TV Programme (voice)	
2021	Benediction	Alexander Fenton	
2021	The Most Reluctant Convert	Hugo Dyson	
2023	Freud's Last Session	Weldon	
2025	Dracula	Henry Spencer	

=== Television ===
Year	Title	Role	Notes
2016	The Crown	Colin Tennant	2 episodes
2018	Doctors	Nolan Sutcliffe	1 episode
2018	Doctor Who	Ronan	Episode: "The Tsuranga Conundrum"
2019	Treadstone	CIA Tech #4	1 episode
2020	The Liberator	Colonel Avery	Miniseries, 2 episodes
2023	Black Mirror	Michael Smart	Episode: "Demon 79"
2024	Masters of the Air	Major Everett Blakely	Miniseries, 8 episodes
2024	Van der Valk	Ruben Mesman	1 episode
2026	Dear England	Jordan Henderson	Miniseries, 4 episodes
TBA	How to Kill Your Family †		Upcoming miniseries

=== Theatre ===
Year	Title	Role	Theatre
2024–2025	Punch	Jacob Dunne	Nottingham Playhouse
2024–2025	Punch	Jacob Dunne	Young Vic
2024–2025	Punch	Jacob Dunne	Apollo Theatre

== Awards and nominations ==
Year	Award	Category	Work	Result
2026	Laurence Olivier Awards	Best Actor	Punch	Nominated
2026	Critics' Circle Theatre Awards	Best Actor	Punch	Nominated
2026	Standard Theatre Awards	Best Actor	Punch	Nominated

== See also ==
- List of British actors
