= Ken Fleming =

Ken Fleming may refer to:

- Ken Fleming (engineer) (1933–2001), piling engineer
- Ken Fleming (musician) (born 1962), Canadian punk rock musician
- Ken Fleming (politician), member of the Kentucky House of Representatives
- Kenneth Fleming (cricketer) (1909–1996), South African cricketer
