= Madison Thompson (actress) =

American actress (born 2000/01)

- Born: 2000 or 2001 (age 25–26); Atlanta, Georgia, U.S.
- Occupation: Actor
- Years active: 2013–present
- Notable work: Ozark
- Website: www.madison-thompson.com

Madison Thompson (born 2000 or 2001) is an American actress. She is best known for her portrayal of Erin Pierce on the Netflix series Ozark. She has also held guest and recurring roles on other television shows, including American Housewife, NCIS: New Orleans, and Kevin (Probably) Saves the World.

== Early life and education ==
Thompson was born and raised in Atlanta, Georgia. She also partially grew up in New York City. She attended high school at the Lovett School in Atlanta where she participated in several stage productions. In 2018, Thompson was nominated for the Shuler Hensley Award for Best Performance By a Supporting Actress for her role as Wendy in a school production of Peter Pan. She graduated from the Lovett School in 2019. Thompson attended the University of Southern California (USC), graduating summa cum laude with a business degree in cinematic arts and a minor in musical theatre. She was a Presidential Merit Scholar and a member of the Kappa Alpha Theta sorority.

== Career ==
Thompson achieved her first major television roles in 2016, appearing on an episode of TNT's Major Crimes and on Nickelodeon's Henry Danger that year. In 2017 and 2018, she had recurring roles on Fox's Shots Fired and on ABC's Kevin (Probably) Saves the World. She later appeared on single episodes of NCIS: New Orleans, Creepshow, and American Housewife. In July 2019, it was announced that Thompson had been added to the cast for season three of the Netflix series Ozark as Erin Pierce. The third season was released onto Netflix in March 2020. The following year, she was cast in the role of Jordan on The Young and the Restless.

In January 2022, Thompson was cast in a leading role for the Paramount+ series Grease: Rise of the Pink Ladies.

== Filmography ==
List of television roles
Year	Title	Role	Notes
2016	Major Crimes	Amanda Pond	Episode 5.1: "Present Tense"
2016	Henry Danger	Tipper	Episode 3.4: "Mouth Candy"
2017	Shots Fired	Katie Eamons	2 episodes
2018	Kevin (Probably) Saves the World	Jessica Garnett	3 episodes
2018	NCIS: New Orleans	Leah Bell	Episode 5.9: "Risk Assessment"
2019	Creepshow	Jill	Episode 1.3: "All Hallow's Eve"
2020-2022	Ozark	Erin Pierce	10 episodes
2020–present	The Young and the Restless	Jordan	Recurring role
2020–21	American Housewife	Lindsey Coolidge	Episode 4.20: "Prom" & Episode 5.11: "The Guardian"
2022	Boo, Bitch	Emma	Guest appearance
2023	Grease: Rise of the Pink Ladies	Susan	Main role, 10 episodes
2026	Euphoria	Oceana	3 episodes

List of film roles
Year	Title	Role	Notes
2025	The Map That Leads to You	Amy	
