= Luke Rollason =

British actor

- Born: 26 May 1992 (age 34)
- Education: Mansfield College, Oxford École Philippe Gaulier
- Occupations: Actor, stand-up comedian, clown
- Television: Extraordinary
- Awards: BAFTA

Luke Rollason is a BAFTA-award-winning British actor and physical comedian. He played Jizzlord in the Disney+ series Extraordinary.

== Early life ==
Rollason studied English at the University of Oxford where he received the Mansfield Scholarship. He performed with the Oxford University Light Entertainment Society in December 2012.

== Career ==
Rollason attended clown school in France at the École Philippe Gaulier. After university, he moved to London and began performing on the alternative comedy scene. Seeing mime Trygve Wakenshaw was “a revelation” to him, expanding his ideas of what could be done onstage. Rollason said the best advice Gaulier gave him was, "We are always searching. When you find your style, that is a good day to die".

At the 2021 Brighton Festival, Rollason set up The Luke Rollason Memorial Bursary to encourage performers from alternative backgrounds to bring unusual approaches to comedy. The bursary offers the cost of their registration fee, contributions to marketing costs and free rehearsal space. To date, he has performed four solo shows at the Edinburgh Festival Fringe.

In December 2021, Rollason was cast in the Disney+ series Extraordinary as Jizzlord, a shapeshifting cat/human. The show was broadcast in January 2023 and was renewed for a second season by Disney+ that same month. Mike Hale of The New York Times wrote that Rollason played the part "with great charm". His performance was named one of the 10 best TV performances of 2023 by The Hollywood Reporter. Other telelvision roles include Becoming Elizabeth and Industry.

In 2025, Rollason's short film Quiet Life won the BAFTA for Best Shortform at the British Academy Television Awards. Released in 2024, the short film was made by Open Mike Productions for BBC Three and BBC iPlayer. That year, he became one of the regular cast members and writers of CBBC's new sketch comedy Horrible Science.

== Selected filmography ==
Year	Title	Role	Notes
2022	Becoming Elizabeth	King's Player	1 episode
2022	Industry	Eric's assistant	1 episode
2023	Jack	Charlie Meredith Bones	Film
2023–2024	Extraordinary	Jizzlord	Main cast, 16 episodes
2024	Quiet Life	Geoffrey (Also writer)	Short TV Film
2025	Two Big Feet	Lad	Film
2025–present	Horrible Science	Various (Also writer)	Sketch series, 30 episodes
2026	Literally	Various (Also writer)	Sketch series, 10 episodes
2026	Supergirl	Rest Stop Clerk	Film
