= Women's rugby union =

Team sport

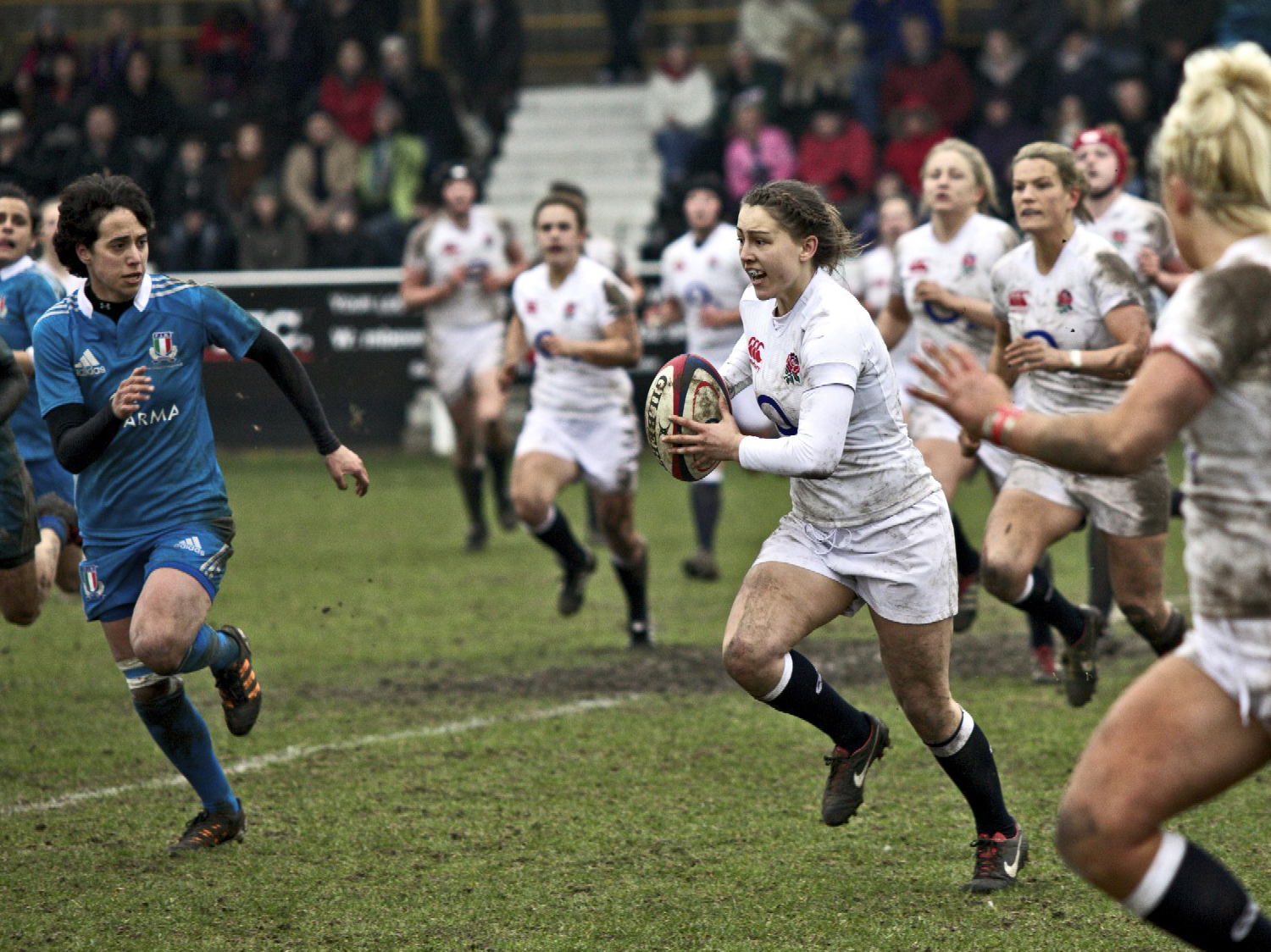
- England's Lauren Cattell runs with the ball as Italy's Manuela Furlan chases, in a scene from a Women's Six Nations match
- Highest governing body: World Rugby
- Nicknames: Rugger
- First played: 19th century

Characteristics
- Contact: Full Contact
- Team members: Fifteen
- Type: Team sport, Outdoor
- Equipment: Rugby ball

Women’s rugby union is a full-contact team sport in which players run with the ball in hand. It is played under the same laws as men’s rugby union, using the same-sized pitch and equipment. The sport has grown in popularity in recent years, aided by increased exposure through international tournaments and greater financial investment.

== History ==
=== The early years: 1880–1950s ===
Cigarette card, 1895.

The origins of women's rugby are unclear. Initially, public reaction to women playing contact sports proved negative. In 1881, when two teams played exhibition "football" games in Scotland and northern England, several games had to be abandoned due to rioting.

While most of these games appear to have been played to the new association football rules, it is clear from reports in the Liverpool Mercury of 27 June 1881 that at least one of these games, played at the Cattle Market Inn Athletic Grounds, Stanley, Liverpool on the 25th, involved scoring goals following "touchdowns" and may therefore have been played to at least a version of rugby rules.

A series of sporting cigarette cards published 1895 in Liverpool includes an image of a woman playing what looks like rugby in kit similar to that described in reports of the 1881 team. It is therefore possible that exhibition games similar to those in 1881 may have continued (with no press reporting) or the pictures may have been reprints for earlier illustrations inspired by the 1881 games, or they may just be an "amusing" cartoon or an illustration of a sport that was not actually being played.

Other than this the official record is silent for most of the nineteenth century. Some girls played the game unofficially as part of their school teams—and the earliest confirmed record of any woman or girl definitely playing rugby at any level anywhere in the world comes from a school game.

This happened at Portora Royal School in Enniskillen, County Fermanagh. Emily Valentine's brothers were responsible for the formation of the school's first rugby team in c1884. Emily practised with the team and in c1887 she played for the school, scoring a try.

The first documented evidence of an attempt to form a purely women's team is from 1891 when a tour of New Zealand by a team of female rugby players was cancelled due to a public outcry.

There are also early reports of women's rugby union being played in France (1903) and England (1913) but in both cases the game was largely behind closed doors.

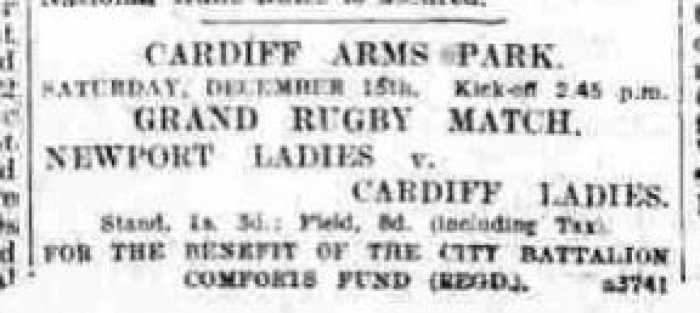
Announcement in the Western Morning News of the very first women's rugby union match, Cardiff, Wales, 15 December 1917

During the First World War some women's charity games were organised, the most well documented taking place at Cardiff Arms Park on 16 December 1917, when Cardiff Ladies beat Newport Ladies 6–0. Maria Eley played full-back for Cardiff and went on to become probably the oldest women's rugby player before she died in Cardiff in 2007 at the age of 106. The Cardiff team (who all worked for Hancocks a local brewery) all wore protective headgear, which predates their male counterparts by some decades.

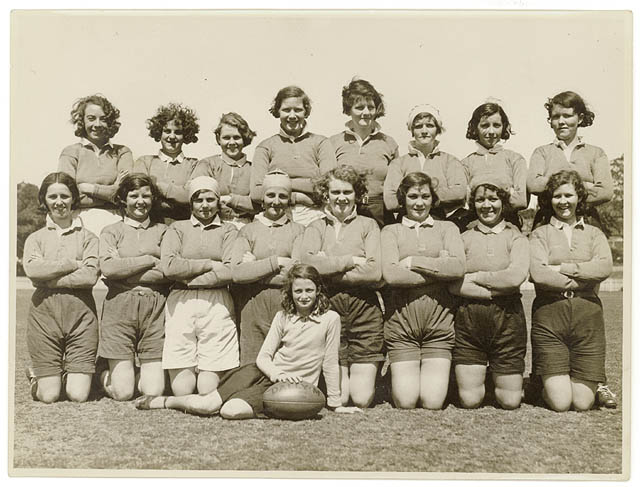
Women's rugby union team, New South Wales, Australia, 1930s

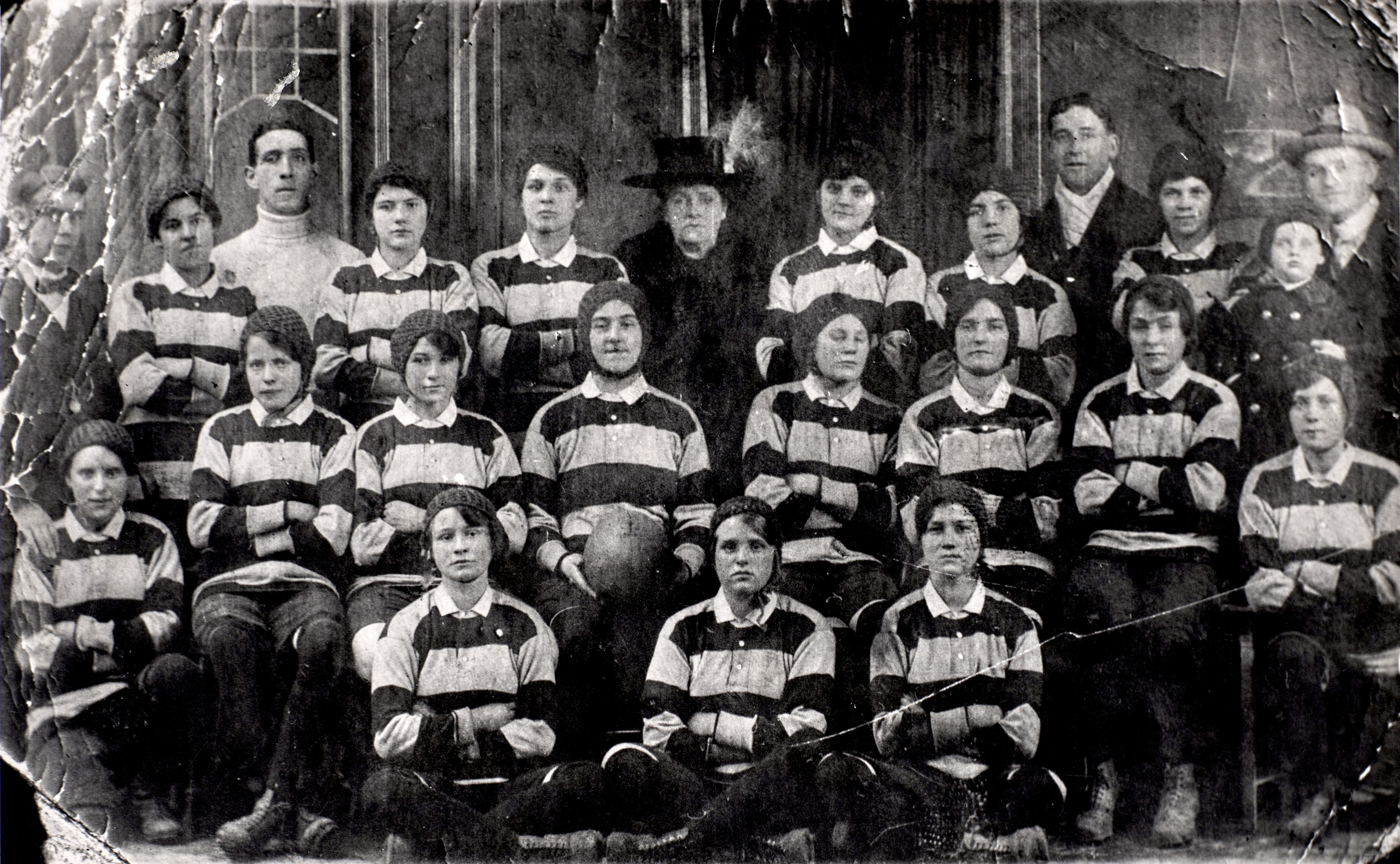
Cardiff Ladies XV in the Cardiff clubhouse, 1917

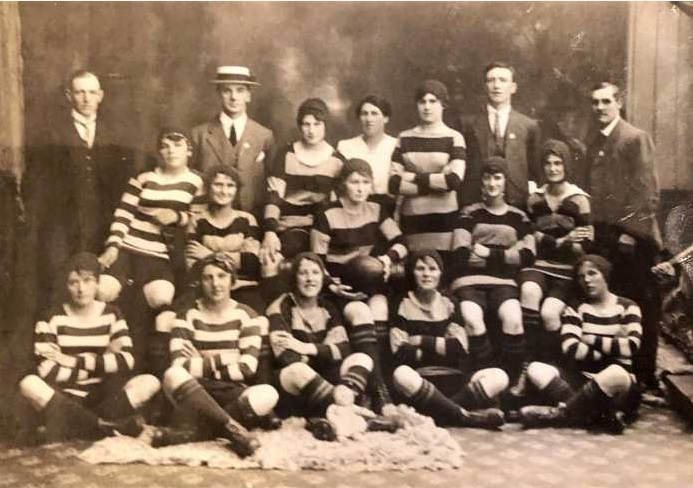
Welsh Munitions factory women's rugby team, 1918

In Sydney in 1921, two women's teams played a game of rugby league in front a crowd of 30,000—a photograph appeared in The Times in 1922—but pressure from authorities ensured that they did not play again. Throughout the 1920s a popular form of women's football game very similar to rugby called "barette" was played across France. The game had only minor differences to the full game (games were 10-a-side and had some minor restrictions on tackling) and there were national championships throughout the decade. It received support from several male rugby players and film also exists of a game being played in 1928. Both barette and the full game of rugby featured in several newspaper cartoons and many photographs exist. For reasons unknown the game appears to fade away in the 1930s.

In 1930 a women's league playing the full game was formed in Australia, in the New South Wales areas of Tamworth and Armidale, which ran until halted by World War Two. Photographs of women's teams also exist from New Zealand from the same period and during the war Maori women took up the game. After the war in 1956 The Belles of St Mary’s—an Australian women's rugby league team—played games in New South Wales—but even as late as the 1960s Women's rugby was banned in Samoa.

=== 1960s–1990 ===
The 1960s was the decade in which the game finally began to put down roots, initially in the universities of Western Europe. In 1962 the first recorded UK women's rugby union team appears at Edinburgh University, in 1963 female students participate in matches against male students in London, and in 1965 university sides are being formed in France.

As the pioneering students left university an adult game began to evolve. Initially (1966) this tended to be confined to charity matches between male and female teams (especially at Worthing RFC, England), though the UK's Daily Herald newspaper includes photographs of girls' teams training in Thornhill, near Dewsbury in Yorkshire in 1965, and at Tadley in Hampshire in 1966—and appealing for fixtures. It is not recorded whether these teams did arrange any games, and so it is not until 1 May 1968 that the first fully documented and recorded women's club match takes place, in France, at Toulouse Fémina Sports in front of "thousands of spectators". The success of the event lead to the formation of the first national association for women's rugby union—the Association Francaise de Rugby Feminin (AFRF) at Toulouse, in 1970.

1970 also saw the first reports of women's rugby union in Canada, and by 1972 four universities in the United States were playing the game: University of Colorado, Colorado State University, the University of Illinois and the University of Missouri. By 1975 university students at Wageningen in the Netherlands were playing, and in the same year clubs appeared in Spain (Arquitectura in Madrid and Osas in Barcelona). The first non-university clubs formed in 1978 in Canada and Netherlands, and in Italy (Milan) a year later.

By 1980 there were club championships in the United States and Sweden, and provincial championships in New Zealand. The game first appeared in Japan in 1981 and in February 1982 University College, London's women's team went on a tour to France playing, amongst other teams, Pontoise—the first recorded overseas tour by a UK team (and possibly the first international tour by any team). A few months later on 13 June 1982 the first women's international—Netherlands 0, France 4—took place at Utrecht (see Women's international rugby union for more details on the history of the international game).

In the UK 1983 saw the Women's Rugby Football Union (WRFU) formed to govern the game across the British Isles. Founder member clubs are: Leicester Polytechnic, Sheffield University, University College London, University of Keele, Warwick University, Imperial College, Leeds University, Magor Maidens, York University and Loughborough University.

The game began to be organised on a more formal basis elsewhere, including:

- 1984 The LNRF (Lega Nazionale Rugby Feminile) formed in Italy
- 1986 First UK National League and Cup competitions established
- 1987 Canadian Rugby Union bylaws amended to include a Vice President Women's Rugby on CRU Board of Directors
- 1988 Japanese Women's Rugby Football Union formed
- 1988 Women's International Rugby Board (WIRB) formed
- 1989 Women's rugby union began to be organized in the USSR
- 1989 ARFR is formally integrated into the Fédération Française de Rugby (FFR), and
- 1990 First Irish club teams formed
- 1990 The US team become the "Eagles" and play-officially for USA Rugby for the first time.

1990 also saw the first international tournament—RugbyFest held in Christchurch, New Zealand. As well as a variety of club sides, including teams from Japan (but not the Japanese national team), were four "national" teams—USA, New Zealand, USSR, and the Netherlands—who played a round-robin tournament. The winner was New Zealand, who then played—and beat—a combined "World XV".

=== A world game in the making: 1990–1998 ===
Rugbyfest 1990 led to the first women's Rugby World cup, which took place in Wales the following year.

Timed to coincide with the second men's World Cup being held in England, it did not meet with official approval from World Rugby (then known as the International Rugby Football Board), a decision which threatened the competition and was a factor in the New Zealand RFU not supporting their entry. However, this did not stop the New Zealanders from taking part, and there were also teams from Wales, the United States, England, France, Canada, Sweden, USSR, Japan, Spain, Italy, and the Netherlands.

The competition was run on a shoestring: Russian players sold souvenirs before and during matches to raise funds to cover their expenses, while four England administrators re-mortgaged their houses to cover the expenses of attending the competition. But after fifteen matches, the first world champions were crowned: the United States, who beat England in the final. Despite the lack of support from the men's game, and very little media coverage, the competition had been a success, and the women's game continued to grow.

- 1991 Netherlands Rugby Union take control of the women's game
- 1991 Women's rugby revived in Australia by Wal Fitzgerald in Newcastle, New South Wales
- 1992 Irish women split from the WRFU to form their own Irish Women's Rugby Football Union
- 1992 The New Zealand women are taken under the umbrella of the NZRFU
- 1993 Scottish women split from the WRFU to be governed by their own Union (the Scottish Women's Rugby Union)
- 1993 Australian Women's Rugby Union formed
- 1994 The WRFU disband, with the Rugby Football Union for Women (RFUW) being formed in England, while the Welsh Women's Rugby Union affiliates with the Welsh Rugby Union

In 1994 a second World Cup was awarded to the Netherlands, but constant prevarication by the IRFB about whether they would (or would not) give the tournament official status caused huge problems for the hosts. Without IRFB support, there was a fear that many unions would not send teams, which would threaten the not only the tournament, but the insolvent Dutch union's viability. In fact, the IRFB went so far as to threaten sanctions against any unions, players and officials who did take part: with this threat, New Zealand, Sweden and Germany withdrew. Faced with this, and the risk of major financial losses, the Dutch withdrew both as hosts and participants with barely weeks to go.

It was Scotland who stepped in to save the event with only 90 days to organise it. The second World Cup was in the end, a purely northern hemisphere affair with 11 competing teams (consisting of the four home nations, France, the United States, Japan, Sweden, Russia, Canada and Kazakhstan) joined by an invited Scottish Students XV. The final was a repeat of 1991, but with this time England overcoming the United States 38–23, the final being played at Raeburn Place, Edinburgh. Despite the events beforehand, the tournament had been a success, and the game continued to grow.

In 1996 the IRFB established a Women's Advisory Committee which produced a five-year development plan for the game. One of its main targets was a 100% increase in player numbers by 2001. Elsewhere in the world:

- 1996 First Home Nations competition held between England, Ireland, Scotland and Wales: won by England.
- 1997 First Hong Kong Sevens tournament for women
- 1998 New Zealand dropped the nickname "Gal Blacks" to become the "Black Ferns", the female version of the "silver fern" used by the male team.
- 1998 The 1998 Women's Rugby World Cup was the first Women's Rugby World Cup to be fully sanctioned by the newly-renamed International Rugby Board, now World Rugby.

=== Acceptance and growth: 1998–present ===
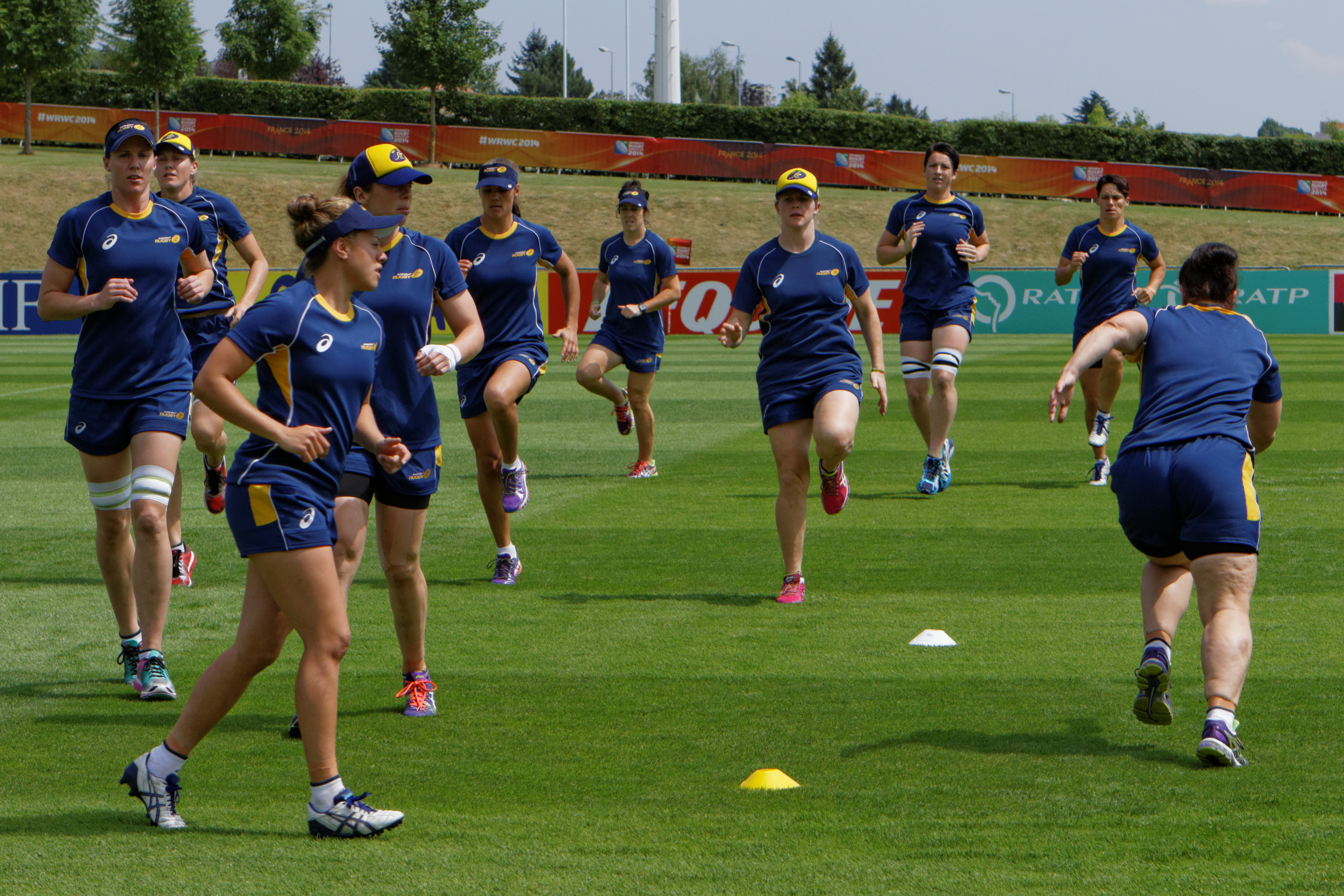
The ARU's decision to drop its support for an Australian women's team in 2002 was deeply controversial, and was reversed two years later.

Widespread acceptance of the game led to women's versions of other major rugby union tournaments (the women's Five Nations commenced in 1999), and growing numbers of headlines. In 2000 the Irish WRFU affiliated fully with the IRFU, but there were still set-backs: in 2002 the Australian RFU dropped support for the women's team's entry to the World Cup. The decision was seen as a factor in IOC rejection of rugby as an Olympic sport for 2004, and amid criticism by the Australian players, this was reversed two years later.

Despite this, women's teams were now being accepted on the main stage. In 2002, Scotland played their first women's match at Murrayfield, and in 2003 England staged the first women's international at Twickenham.

In 2006, the RFU devoted the rugby museum's main annual exhibition to the history of women's rugby— "Women's Rugby — A Work in Progress", and the same year the Women's Rugby World Cup was broadcast live on the internet.

The growth in popularity among women attracted women in both developed and emerging nations, being the fastest growing sport in the world. The participation rates in both rugby sevens and rugby unions (with 15 players) has close to 500,000 new players joining every year globally. According to World Rugby, women's rugby is growing faster (if not as fast) as men's rugby, and it is estimated that by 2026 40% of the total number of rugby players will be female. The game remains an amateur, minority sport, but a fast-growing one played in over 80 countries worldwide. Cost and player numbers mean that, in many of these nations, sevens tends to dominate, but 15-a-side championships have now been established in all regions.

- 1999
  - Irish WRFU affiliate fully with the IRFU
  - The Women's Home Nations Championship becomes the Women's Five Nations with the addition of France.
- 2000
  - South African women affiliate with South African Rugby Football Union.
  - The addition of Spain establishes the Women's Six Nations.
- 2002 Australian RFU drops their support for women's team's entry to world cup; this decision seen as a factor in IOC rejection of rugby as an Olympic sport. Reversed two years later.
- 2004 Wales restrict national team selections to players from Welsh teams. Slump in performance significant factor in rejection of entry for 2006 World Cup. Decision reversed in time for 2006 Six Nations.
- 2005
  - Canada controversially selected as hosts for 2006 World Cup—despite major bid from England. Believed that selection was part of an IRB policy to host tournaments outside of Europe.
  - Ugandan women form Uganda Women's Rugby Association (UWRA) and affiliate to the Uganda Rugby Union (URU).
- 2006
  - Major exhibition on history of women's rugby—"Women's Rugby—A Work in Progress" held at Twickenham
  - The inaugural Confederation of African Rugby (CAR) women's 7s. Uganda are the hosts and lose to South Africa in the final.
  - New Zealand's Black Ferns defeat England in the IRB's Rugby World Cup Women's Final in Canada.
- 2007
  - Donna Kennedy becomes Scotland's most-capped player and the World's most-capped female player with 100 caps. Her last game a narrow defeat to France. This record has now been overtaken by Louise Rickard of Wales, who equalled Kennedy's record in the 2008 6 Nations.
  - Welsh Women's Rugby Union merges with the Welsh Rugby Union.
  - The Women's Six Nations is formally adopted by the men's Six Nations organisation; as a result, Spain are replaced by Italy.
  - Third Caribbean Championship in the Cayman Islands are cancelled less than 48 hours before they are due to start due to Hurricane Dean
- 2009
  - Australia take the title at the inaugural IRB Women's Rugby World Cup Sevens in Dubai, which was fully integrated into the men's competition. Australia beat New Zealand after extra time in the final. Tournament favourites England go out in the quarter-finals.
  - Wales defeat England for the first time in the 22-year history of the fixture, bringing to an end England's quest for a fourth consecutive 6 Nations Grand Slam.
  - England's women's rugby governing body, the RFUW, establish a mirror to the existing boys' AASE (Advanced Apprenticeship in Sporting Excellence) programme at Hartpury College, Gloucestershire and Moulton College, Northamptonshire. AASE programmes are offered at RFU Academies at Guinness Premiership clubs across England. For the programme to be made available to girls is a landmark.
  - A record number of countries bid to host the 2014 Women's World Cup.
  - In June, Scottish Women's Rugby Union merges with the Scottish Rugby Union.
- 2010 Crowd of 13,253—a world record for a women's match—watches the World Cup final at Twickenham Stoop.
- 2011 The first IRB-sponsored women's sevens event apart from the World Cup Sevens, the IRB Women's Sevens Challenge Cup, was held in Dubai as part of the 2011 Dubai Sevens.
- 2012 The IRB, renamed in 2014 as World Rugby, launches the competition now known as the World Rugby Women's Sevens Series, analogous to the men's World Rugby Sevens Series.
- 2016 The Rio Summer 2016 Olympics included men's and women's rugby sevens—with the women's tournament being given absolute equality with the men's in terms of both player and team numbers.
- 2018
  - A new attendance record for a women's international is set, with 17,440 in attendance at Stade des Alpes in Grenoble for the France–England fixture in the 2018 Women's Six Nations.
  - The Commonwealth Games featured a women's sevens tournament for the first time. New Zealand won the gold medal, matching the finish of their men's team at these Games.
- 2019
  - The Women's Rugby Super Series is expanded to the top five ranked teams, providing another top level competition series.
  - World Rugby officially removed sex/gender designations from the title of the Women's World Cup; all future World Cups, whether for men or women, will be officially known as the "Rugby World Cup" with a year designation. The first tournament to be affected by this change is the 2021 women's World Cup in New Zealand.

== Rugby World Cup ==
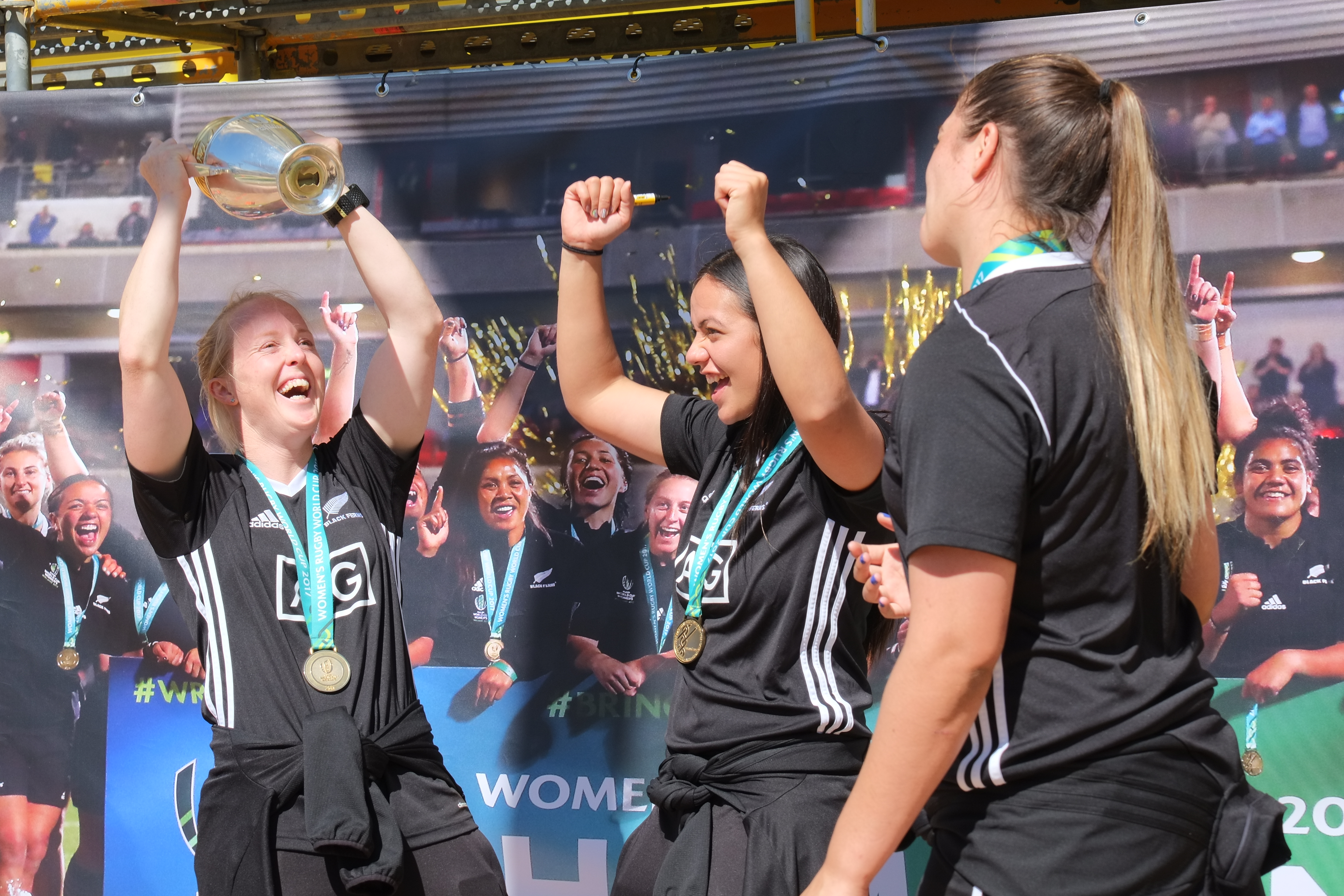
Kendra Cocksedge, a three-time winner of the Rugby World Cup with the Black Ferns, hoists the trophy.

The highest profile women's rugby tournament is the Rugby World Cup, historically known as the Women's Rugby World Cup. The women's World Cup began in 1991, and has generally been played every four years. The most recent World Cup was held in Ireland in 2017, where New Zealand were the winners. In 2019, World Rugby announced that sex/gender designations would officially be removed from the title of the World Cup; the first tournament affected was the World Cup in 2022, hosted by New Zealand.

The most successful nations in the World Cup have been New Zealand, who have won it six times, and England, who have reached the final nine times.

== Women's rugby sevens ==
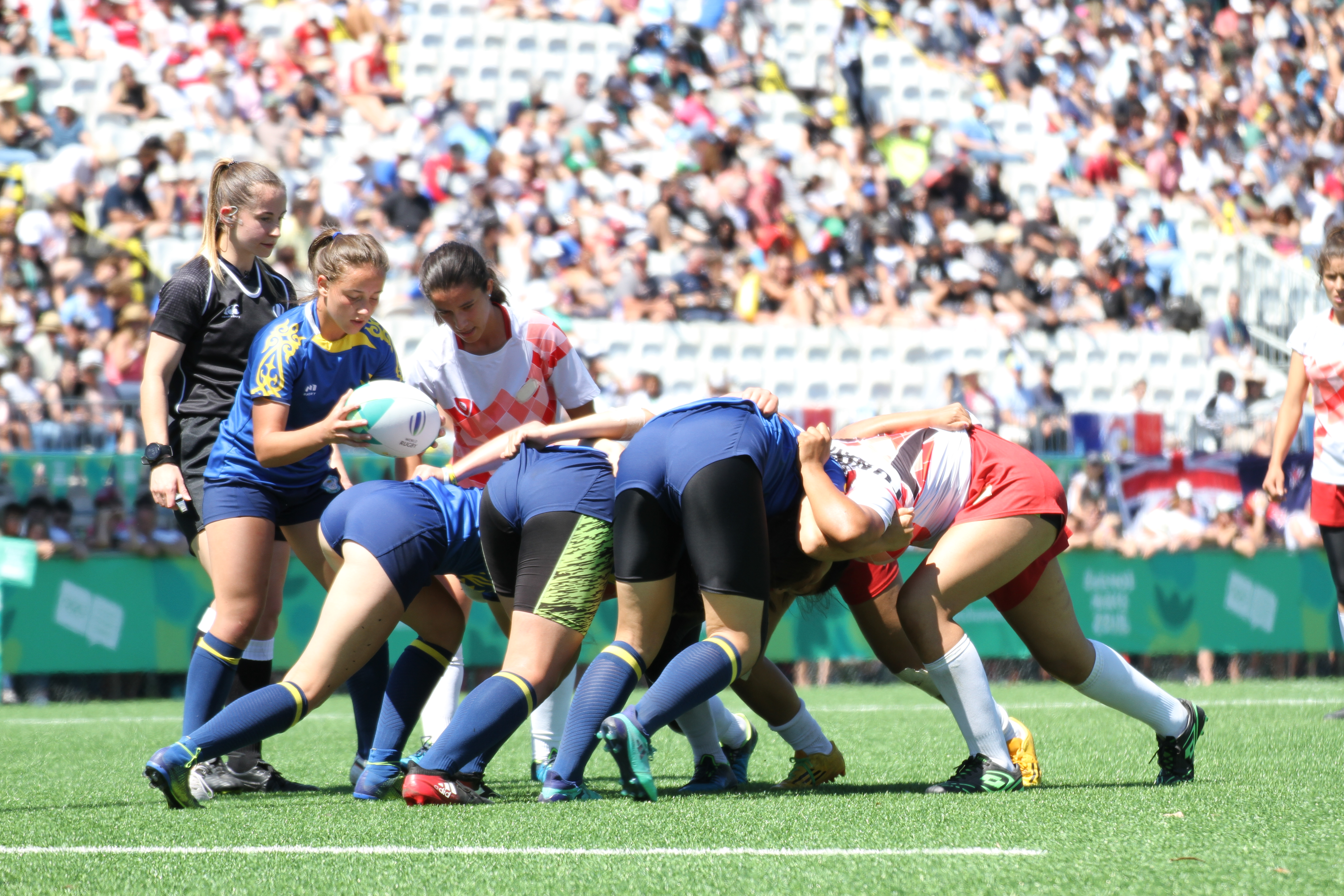
Players participating in a scrum during a women's rugby sevens game at the Summer Youth Olympics.

The primary annual global competition for women's rugby sevens is the World Rugby Women's World Series. The Women's Series was launched in the 2012-13 season. It features 4-6 tournaments each year.

Women's rugby sevens at the Hong Kong Sevens has been dominated by New Zealand, with either the New Zealand team (1999–2001) or the Aotearoa Maori team (playing as New Zealand) winning the annual tournament from 1997 until 2007. The United States won the Hong Kong Sevens in 2008 by defeating Canada in the final (New Zealand did not send a team).

The inaugural Women's Rugby World Cup Sevens tournament took place in Dubai together with the men's tournament in 2009. Australia defeated New Zealand 15–10 in extra-time to become the first to win the Women's Rugby World Cup.

Women's rugby sevens was included in World Rugby's successful bid to reintroduce rugby to the Olympics in 2016. At the 2016 Olympics, Australia defeated New Zealand in the final to win the gold medal.

Women's rugby sevens has also been added to several regional multi-sport tournaments, including the Pan American Games in 2015 and the Commonwealth Games in 2018.

== See also ==
- Canada Cup
- Caribbean Women's Rugby Championship
- Emil Signes
- FIRA Women's European Championship
- Nomads Women's rugby team
- Women's international rugby union
- Pacific Tri-Nations
- Women's Six Nations Championship
- Women's Rugby World Cup
- Women's rugby league

== Sources ==
- An exhibition on the history of women's rugby union, organised by the Museum of Rugby at Twickenham in 2006.
- The Timeline of Women's rugby
- The World Rugby Museum.
