= Punch (play) =

2024 play by James Graham

- West End Promotional Poster
- Written by: James Graham
- Based on: Right from Wrong by Jacob Dunne
- Genre: Drama
- Setting: Nottingham

Premiere
- Date: 4 May 2024
- Place: Nottingham Playhouse
- Directed by: Adam Penford

Punch is a 2024 play written by British playwright James Graham. It is based on the non-fiction book Right from Wrong by Jacob Dunne. It premiered at Nottingham Playhouse in 2024, before transferring to Young Vic in 2025.

It subsequently transferred to the Apollo Theatre in the West End from 22 September to 29 November 2025, where it ran concurrently with its Broadway counterpart.

== Synopsis ==
Jacob Dunne punches a man with fatal consequences.

== Background ==
The play is based on Jacob Dunne's memoir, Right From Wrong. Dunne was jailed for the manslaughter of trainee paramedic James Hodgkinson in 2011. Hodgkinson had been visiting Nottingham to attend a test match, and was killed as a result of an unprovoked single punch. Through Restorative justice, Hodgkinson's mother Joan Scourfield later forgave Dunne. Dunne and Scourfield have subsequently campaigned about the risks of a single punch, and taken part in Question and Answer sessions together following some performances of the play.

After only a handful of performances Dunne was no longer able to watch the second act of the play. After the interval Punch explores him meeting Hodgkinson's mum, a meeting that Dunne acknowledged had a profound effect on him.

Punch was written by James Graham, with direction by Adam Penford. Graham is an Olivier Award-winner who is often described as a state of the nation playwright. His previous work includes Best of Enemies, Dear England, This House, and Sherwood. The original productions featured design by Anna Fleischle, with lighting by Robbie Butler, sound design by Alexandra Faye Braithwaite, and movement direction by Leanne Pinder.

The play was published by Methuen Drama in March 2025. Jacob Dunne and James Graham appeared as guests on the Rest is Politics: Leading podcast to discuss the play and its significance.

== Production history ==
=== Nottingham (2024) ===
The world premiere of Punch opened on 4 May 2024, at the Nottingham Playhouse for a limited run and closed on 25 May 2024. The cast included Julie Hesmondhalgh, Tony Hirst, David Shields, Alec Boaden, Shalisha James-Davis, and Emma Pallant. The production received critical acclaim and was nominated for two WhatsOnStage Awards, including Best New Play.

=== Off-West End (2025) ===
Punch transferred to Young Vic the following year. Previews began 1 March 2025, with an opening night on 6 March. The original cast returned, with the show running until 26 April.

=== West End (2025) ===
The show was transferred to the Apollo Theatre in the West End from 22 September to 29 November 2025, where it ran concurrently with the Broadway production.

=== Broadway (2025) ===
Punch premiered on Broadway on 10 September 2025 as part of the Manhattan Theatre Club's 2025-2026 season at the Samuel J. Friedman Theatre. Initial casting was announced in June 2025, with Will Harrison playing Jacob.

=== Uk Tours ===
Following the West End run the play returned to Nottingham Playhouse in March 2026, before a short tour at Leeds Playhouse from 7 to 11 April and Theatre Royal, Plymouth from 14 to 18 April 2026.

== Cast and characters ==
Character	Nottingham	Off-West End	Broadway	West End
Character	2024	2025		
Jacob	David Shields	David Shields	Will Harrison	David Shields
Joan	Julie Hesmondhalgh	Julie Hesmondhalgh	Victoria Clark	Julie Hesmondhalgh
David, Derek, Raf's Dad, and Tony	Tony Hirst	Tony Hirst	Sam Robards	Tony Hirst
Raf, DS Villiers, and Sam	Alec Boaden	Alec Boaden	Cody Kostro	Alec Boaden
Nicola, Teacher, and Clare	Shalisha James-Davis	Shalisha James-Davis	Camila Canó-Flaviá	Shalisha James-Davis
Wendy, Jacob's Mum, and Sandra	Emma Pallant	Emma Pallant	Lucy Taylor	Emma Pallant

== Awards and nominations ==
=== 2026 West End production ===
Year	Award	Category	Nominee	Result
2026	Laurence Olivier Awards	Best New Play	James Graham	Won
2026	Laurence Olivier Awards	Best Actor	David Shields	Nominated
2026	Laurence Olivier Awards	Best Actress in a Supporting Role	Julie Hesmondhalgh	Won
2026	Laurence Olivier Awards	Best Lighting Design	Robbie Butler	Nominated
2026	Critics' Circle Theatre Awards	Best New Play	James Graham	Won
2026	Critics' Circle Theatre Awards	Best Actor	David Shields	Nominated
2026	Critics' Circle Theatre Awards	Best Actress	Julie Hesmondhalgh	Nominated
2026	Standard Theatre Awards	Best New Play	James Graham	Won
2026	Standard Theatre Awards	Best Actor	David Shields	Nominated

=== 2026 Broadway production ===
Year	Award	Category	Nominee	Result	Ref.
2026	Outer Critics Circle Award	Outstanding New Broadway Play		Nominated	
2026	Outer Critics Circle Award	Outstanding Lead Performer in a Broadway Play	Will Harrison	Nominated	
2026	Tony Award	Best Actor in a Play	Will Harrison	Nominated	
2026	Dorian Award	Outstanding Broadway Play		Nominated	
2026	Dorian Award	Outstanding Lead Performance in a Broadway Play	Will Harrison	Nominated	
2026	Dorian Award	Outstanding Script of a Broadway Play	James Graham	Nominated	
