= Will Harrison (actor) =

American actor (born 1996)

- Born: 1996 (age 29–30)
- Education: Carnegie Mellon University (BFA)

Will Harrison (born 1996) is an American actor.

A native of Ithaca, New York, Harrison grew up in Hadley, Massachusetts. He graduated from the Carnegie Mellon School of Drama in 2019.

In February 2020, Harrison was cast in a lead role in the miniseries Daisy Jones & the Six. In May 2022, he was added to the cast of the miniseries Manhunt, portraying David Herold. He also had a role in A Complete Unknown, a biopic about Bob Dylan directed by James Mangold. Alongside his Daisy Jones & the Six cast, he would win the Guild of Music Supervisors Award for Best Song Written and/or Recorded for Television in 2024.

On stage, Harrison appeared in the play Punch, his performance earning him a nomination for the Tony Award for Best Actor in a Play at the 79th Tony Awards.

== Acting credits ==
=== Film ===
Year	Title	Role	Notes
2024	A Complete Unknown	Bob Neuwirth	
2026	Play House	Elliot	
TBA	Rubber Hut †	Matty	Filming

=== Television ===
Year	Title	Role	Notes	Ref.
2019	Madam Secretary	Zach Barnow	1 episode	
2023	Daisy Jones & the Six	Graham Dunne	Miniseries, 10 episodes	
2024	Manhunt	David Herold	Miniseries, 7 episodes	
2025	Murdaugh: Death in the Family	Buster Murdaugh	Miniseries, 8 episodes	

=== Theater ===
Year	Title	Role	Theatre
2025	Punch	Jacob Dunne	Samuel J. Friedman Theatre, Broadway

== Awards and nominations ==
Year	Award	Category	Work	Result	Ref.
2026	Tony Award	Best Leading Actor in a Play	Punch	Nominated	
2026	Outer Critics Circle Award	Outstanding Lead Performer in a Broadway Play	Punch	Nominated	
2026	Dorian Award	Outstanding Lead Performance in a Broadway Play	Punch	Nominated	
