= Honey (TV series) =

British–German spy television series

- Poster featuring Ann Skelly and Rory Kinnear
- Genre: Espionage
- Created by: Emma Moran
- Written by: Emma Moran; Emme Hoy
- Directed by: Toby MacDonald; Michelle Savill
- Starring: Ann Skelly; Nate Mann; Jannis Niewöhner; Rory Kinnear
- Music by: David Holmes
- Countries of origin: United Kingdom; Germany
- Original language: English
- No. of series: 1
- No. of episodes: 3

Production
- Executive producers: Sally Woodward Gentle; Lee Morris; Emma Moran
- Producer: Christopher Hall
- Cinematography: Wojciech Szepel
- Editor: Adam Moss
- Production companies: Sid Gentle Films; Fifth Season

Original release
- Network: BBC One (UK); ZDF (Germany)
- Release: 14 November 2026 – present

Related
- Killing Eve

Honey is a British-German espionage television series created by Emma Moran for the BBC and ZDF. It is a prequel to Killing Eve. It premiered in the United Kingdom on BBC One on 14 November 2026.

== Premise ==
An undercover MI6 agent undertaking counterespionage in Berlin in 1982 during the Cold War gets drawn into a dangerous ménage-à-trois.

== Cast and characters ==
=== Main ===
- Ann Skelly as Martha Schmitt / Carolyn Martens
- Nate Mann as Kurt Fischer
- Jannis Niewöhner as Friedrich Bauman
- Rory Kinnear as Graham Anderson

=== Supporting ===
- Sofia Oxenham as Greta Abstreiter
- Oliver Cudbill as Stefan Weiss
- Sonita Henry as Anne Anderson
- Victoria Mayer as Ingrid Schimmel
- Valentino Dalle Mura as Rolf Muller
- July Namir as Kamilla Akhmedova
- Julian Niedermeier as Otto Kowalski
- Daniel Zielinski as Tomas Klein

== Episodes ==
No.	Title	Directed by	Written by	Original release date
1	"Episode 1"	Toby MacDonald	Emma Moran	14 November 2026
2	"Episode 2"	Toby MacDonald	Emma Moran	14 November 2026
3	"Episode 3"	Toby MacDonald	Emme Hoy	21 November 2026
4	"Episode 4"	Michelle Savill	TBA	28 November 2026
5	"Episode 5"	Michelle Savill	TBA	5 December 2026
6	"Episode 6"	Michelle Savill	TBA	12 December 2026

== Production ==
=== Development ===
The six-part series is created and executive produced by Emma Moran for BBC and ZDF. It is made in association with Fifth Season. Emme Hoy served as a writer on the series alongside Moran. It is executive produced by Sally Woodward Gentle and Lee Morris for Sid Gentle Films. The producer is Christopher Hall. It was reported in April 2025 that the series is a prequel to television series Killing Eve featuring the character Carolyn Martens, the head of MI6's Russia Desk from that series, played by Fiona Shaw, though the broadcasters declined to comment on a connection between the two series. The directors include Toby MacDonald and Michelle Savill.

=== Casting ===
The cast is led by Ann Skelly, Nate Mann, Jannis Niewöhner, Rory Kinnear and Sofia Oxenham. First-look images from filming were released in February 2026.

=== Filming ===
Filming locations included Vilnius, Lithuania, standing in for 1980s Berlin with local production company Baltic Film Services working in collaboration with Sid Gentle Films in January through to March 2026. Districts used for filming included Naujamiestis and Lazdynai, as well as the Vilnius Palace of Culture, Entertainment and Sports. Filming was scheduled to last for 57 days in Vilnius, with additional filming also taking place in Lithuanian cities Kaunas, Klaipėda and Palanga.

== Broadcast ==
The series premiered in the United Kingdom on BBC One and BBC iPlayer on 14 November 2026. It had its world premiere earlier at 2026 MIPCOM in Cannes.
