= Emily Valentine =

Northern Irish rugby player

Emily Galway
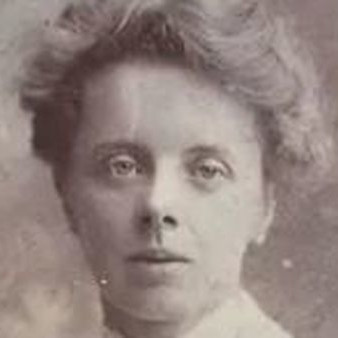
- Born: Emily Frances Valentine; 14 March 1878 Enniskillen, County Fermanagh, Ireland
- Died: 1967 London, England
- School: Portora Royal School
- Occupation: Nurse

Rugby union career
- Position: wing
Youth career
- 1887-?: Portora Royal School Wasps

Emily Frances Valentine, designated the first lady of rugby and "female William Web Ellis" by the media, is the earliest documented female rugby player (at the age of 10) in 1887, and provides the only confirmed record of a woman playing in the nineteenth century. Prior to the discovery of Valentine, the earliest named female rugby player was Mary Eley in 1917, who at the age of sixteen played for the Cardiff Ladies.

== Rugby ==
Valentine, born in Enniskillen, County Fermanagh, Ireland on 14 March 1878, was the youngest of six brothers and sisters, as the daughter of William John Valentine, a teacher of classics, and Grace Valentine (nee Dalton). She played her first match of rugby union at the Portora Royal School, three years after her father William Valentine was named Assistant Headmaster. According to her memoirs, in the winter of 1887, she removed her hat and overcoat to play alongside her two brothers (William, aged 16, and John, aged 10 or 11) as their team was a man short. Valentine first kicked place, but then scored a try in her first game after moving to the wing alongside her brothers in the backline. Valentine would continue to participate with the team in practices and intra-school matches according to the school's records which also includes correspondence from Valentine in 1951.

== Personal life ==
Valentine moved to South Africa in the late 19th century. She became a nurse and changed her name to Galway after marrying military doctor Major John Galeway OBE in 1909. Valentine moved to India until about 1915 (and possibly Canada) before settling in England.
