= Robert Burrowes (priest) =

Former Irish Anglican priest

Robert Burrowes, D.D., was an Anglican priest in Ireland during the second half of the 18th and the first half of the 19th centuries.

Burrowes was educated at Trinity College, Dublin. He was Rector of Cappagh and later Archdeacon of Ferns from 1796 to 1798, At the height of the 1798 rising, he resigned as Archdeacon of Ferns and Rector of Adamstown, County Wexford, and became Master of the Royal School at Enniskillen; in 1819 he was appointed as Dean of Cork and remained in post until his death in 1841.
