= And Out Comes the Wolf =

Upcoming American music drama film

- Directed by: Danny Peykoff
- Story by: Danny Peykoff; Jason Neese; Jamie Neese
- Based on: ...And Out Come the Wolves by Rancid
- Produced by: Danny Peykoff; Jason Neese; Jamie Neese; Glenn Kleczkowski; Paul Hadad
- Starring: Orlando Norman; Spence Moore II; Heidi Grace Engerman; Cassady McClincy Zhang; Giancarlo Esposito; Harold Perrineau; Taryn Manning; Ryan Hurst
- Production company: Big Newport Studios
- Release date: October 16, 2026 (Newport Beach Film Festival)
- Country: United States
- Language: English

And Out Comes the Wolf is an upcoming American musical drama film inspired by the Rancid 1995 album ...And Out Come the Wolves. The film marks the directorial debut of producer Danny Peykoff and stars Orlando Norman, Spence Moore II, Heidi Grace Engerman, Cassady McClincy Zhang, Giancarlo Esposito, Harold Perrineau, Taryn Manning, and Ryan Hurst.

== Cast ==
- Orlando Norman
- Spence Moore II
- Heidi Grace Engerman
- Cassady McClincy Zhang
- Giancarlo Esposito
- Harold Perrineau
- Taryn Manning
- Ryan Hurst

== Production ==
=== Casting ===
In November 2024, the film was announced as producer Danny Peykoff's directorial debut and that Orlando Norman, Spence Moore II, Heidi Grace Engerman, and Cassady McClincy Zhang would star in the film along with Sam Rechner, West Mulholland, and Curran Walters.

By December 2024, Giancarlo Esposito, Harold Perrineau, Taryn Manning, Ryan Hurst, Ayanna Berkshire, Cole Failing, and Katie O'Grady had joined the cast.

=== Filming ===
Filming took place in Portland, Oregon.

=== Post-production ===
In August 2025, the film's trailer was released and the title was changed from Out Come the Wolves to And Out Comes the Wolf. It was scheduled for release in fall 2025.

== Release ==
The film will have its world premiere at the Newport Beach Film Festival on Friday, October 16, 2026.
