= Sofia Oxenham =

English actress

- Education: Royal Academy of Dramatic Art (BA)
- Occupation: Actress
- Years active: 2019-present
- Television: Extraordinary

Sofia Oxenham is an English television actress. She played Tess Tregidden on the BBC One series Poldark and Carrie on the Disney+ series Extraordinary.

== Early life ==
Oxenham has an Australian father and Cornish mother, two brothers and a sister. Oxenham was born in France but grew up in Devon before the family moved to Cornwall when she was a teenager.

Oxenham was a keen actress and participated in school plays and local amateur dramatic productions in Cornwall.

== Career ==
Oxenham's television roles have included playing series 5 regular Tess Tregidden on BBC One’s series Poldark, a recurring role as Eydis on Netflix series Cursed, as well as having parts on Doc Martin, Dracula, Soulmates, and Grantchester.

Since 2023 Oxenham played in the lead role of Carrie in the Disney+ superhero comedy series Extraordinary. Carrie has the ability to communicate with spirits from beyond the world of living. Oxenham described it as the first comedic role she had ever performed. Mike Hale in The New York Times praised her for the communicating beyond the grave scenes which “a lip-syncing Oxenham does to great comic effect”. The show was well received and renewed for a second season by Disney+ in January 2023. In March 2024, she was nominated in the “Female performance in a comedy programme” category at the 2024 British Academy Television Awards.

In 2024, she appeared in Amazon Prime Video true-life series A Very Royal Scandal, appearing alongside Michael Sheen, playing Princess Eugenie. In 2025, she will play Harriet Smith in Ava Pickett's adaptation of Jane Austen's Emma. The following year, she was cast in BBC Cold War espionage thriller Honey.

== Filmography ==
Key
†	Denotes works that have not yet been released

Year	Title	Role	Notes
2019	Grantchester	Lottie	Series 4; episode 2
2019	Poldark	Tess Tregidden	Series 5; episodes 1–8
2019	Doc Martin	Ally	Series 9; episode 6: "Equilibrium"
2020	Dracula	Sam	Mini-series; episode 3: "The Dark Compass"
2020	Cursed	Eydis	Episodes 5 and 7–10
2020	Soulmates	Hannah	Season 1; episode 2: "The Lovers"
2023–2024	Extraordinary	Carrie	Lead role. Series 1 and 2; 16 episodes
2024	A Very Royal Scandal	Princess Eugenie	Mini-series; episodes 1–3
2025	Death in Paradise	Lisa Bulmer	Series 14; episode 2
2025	Ovary-Acting	Ovy	Short film
2026	Honey†	Greta Abstreiter	
