= Play House (film) =

2026 horror film by Nicolas Curcio

- Directed by: Nicolas Curcio
- Written by: Nicolas Curcio; Kirby Gladstein
- Produced by: Nicolas Curcio; Kirby Gladstein; Ben Gojer; Jack Forbes; Derek Tramont
- Starring: Will Harrison; Jessica Sula; Jordan Gonzalez; James Urbaniak
- Cinematography: Zayd Ezzeldine
- Edited by: Chester Howie; Chris Visser
- Music by: Gavin Brivik; Cali Wang
- Production companies: Skinny Ghost; Chroma; Divide/Conquer; Blumhouse Atomic
- Distributed by: Focus Features
- Release dates: September 19, 2026 (Fantastic Fest); April 2, 2027 (United States)
- Running time: 85 minutes
- Country: United States
- Language: English
- Budget: $100,000

Play House is a 2026 American horror film directed by Nicolas Curcio in his directorial debut and written by Curcio and Kirby Gladstein. It stars Will Harrison, Jessica Sula, Jordan Gonzalez and James Urbaniak. Jason Blum serves as an executive producer through his Blumhouse Atomic banner.

Play House had its world premiere at Fantastic Fest on September 19, 2026, and is scheduled for a theatrical release in the United States on April 2, 2027, by Focus Features.

== Premise ==
While renovating a dilapidated house to win back his ex, a young man named Elliot discovers VHS tapes of an unaired children's TV show in the basement. But as the show’s dark history surfaces, it seeps into his life, threatening his last chance at reconciliation.

== Cast ==
- Will Harrison as Elliot
- Jessica Sula as Cath
- Jordan Gonzalez as Alden
- James Urbaniak as Mr. Morton

== Production ==
On February 20, 2026, it was announced that Nicolas Curcio was set to co-write and direct the horror film Play House, with Will Harrison, Jessica Sula, Jordan Gonzalez, and James Urbaniak starring in the film. Adam Hendricks and Greg Gilreath would serve as executive producers through their Divide/Conquer banner. Principal photography started that same month in Los Angeles.

== Release ==
Play House had its world premiere at Fantastic Fest on September 19, 2026. In October 2026, Focus Features and Blumhouse Atomic acquired the film for seven figures, with Jason Blum joining the film as an executive producer; although a press release from Focus stated the companies had acquired worldwide rights to the film, a Deadline Hollywood article claimed the deal excluded Latin America and India. The following month, Focus scheduled the film for a theatrical release in the United States on April 2, 2027.

== Reception ==
On the review aggregator website Rotten Tomatoes, 100% of 11 critics' reviews are positive, with an average rating of 6.8/10.
