= Horrible Science (TV series) =

British children's television series

Horrible Science is the name of 2 TV series based on the Scholastic book series of the same name and stylistically fashioned after the Horrible Histories children's sketch show, both of which are part of the Horrible Histories franchise.

== CITV series ==
In 2015, CITV ordered a 10-part series of the children's sketch show Horrible Science starring actor Ben Miller, who had previously completed a PhD in solid state physics at Cambridge University. Miller had recently guest starred in a Horrible Histories episode marking 800 years of Magna Carta as King John. Horrible Science was co-funded by ITV, The Wellcome Trust, ABC Australia, and Discovery Asia, and was produced by Miller's production company, Toff Media. Filming took place in Wimbledon, South West London.

The cast included Chris Martin, Letty Butler, Tom Bell, Eleanor Lawrence, Jason Forbes and Susan Wokoma. On the tone, the show's producers commented, "Horrible Science delights in the messy, gory and macabre, but as well as wallowing in all things yucky, it is full of fascinating science. Miller explained, "With this series, we really wanted it to be funny first and scientific second. We wanted to connect with children who had been put off science.” Each episode had a central theme, for example Gruesome Guts and Chemical Chaos, which was expounded through comedy sketches, science experiments, and songs. Each episode also featured a guest actor portraying a historical scientist being interviewed.

== CBBC series ==
In 2025, CBBC released a new series based on the Horrible Science books.

Starring Jessica Ransom, Tom Stourton, James McNicholas, Richard David-Caine, Harrie Hayes, Inel Tomlinson, Timmika Ramsay, Emily Lloyd-Saini, Luke Rollason and Halema Hussain, the series premiered on the 9th of May.

A second series was ordered by CBBC in April 2025, ahead of the first season's premiere.

Horrible Science was nominated for Best Children / Youth Series at the 2025 Venice TV Awards.
