= 2025 British Academy Scotland Awards =

Edition of the British Academy Scotland Awards

- Date: 16 November 2025
- Site: Glasgow, Scotland
- Hosted by: Edith Bowman

The 2025 British Academy Scotland Awards took place on 16 November 2025 in Glasgow, Scotland. The ceremony was hosted by Edith Bowman.

== Nominations ==
The nominations were announced on 1 October. Winners will be listed first and highlighted in boldface.

| Best Actor (Film/Television) | Best Actress (Film/Television) |
|---|---|
| **James McArdle – Four Mothers**; David Tennant – Rivals; James McAvoy – Speak No Evil; Ncuti Gatwa – Doctor Who; Peter Capaldi – Black Mirror; Ruaridh Mollica – Sebastian | **Saoirse Ronan – The Outrun**; Anna Próchniak – The Tattooist of Auschwitz; Catherine McCormack – Lockerbie: A Search for Truth; Izuka Hoyle – Big Boys; Karen Gillan – Douglas Is Cancelled; Tilda Swinton – The End |
| Best Director (Factual) | Best Director (Fiction) |
| **Matt Pinder – The Hunt for Peter Tobin**; Anne-Clair Pilley – Lena Zavaroni: The Forgotten Child Star; Jack Cocker – From Roger Moore with Love; Suzanne Raes – Where Dragons Live | **Nora Fingscheidt – The Outrun**; Johnny Allan – The Devil’s Hour; Niall MacCormick – Rebus; Robert McKillop – Ludwig |
| Best Entertainment | Best Factual Entertainment |
| **Up Late with Nicola Benedetti – IWC Media/Sky Arts**; The All Star Euros Sketch Show – The Comedy Unit/BBC Scotland; Burns Night – BBC Scotland | **All Aboard! Scotland's Poshest Train – 14th Floor Productions/Channel 4**; Designing the Hebrides – DSP/BBC Scotland; Location, Location, Location – IWC Media/Channel 4; Scotland's Home of the Year – IWC Media/BBC Scotland |
| Best Factual Series | Best Feature Film |
| **The Hunt for Peter Tobin – Firecrest Films/BBC Scotland**; Highland Cops – Firecrest Films/BBC Scotland; Inside Barlinnie – Friel Kean Films/BBC Scotland | **On Falling**; The Outrun; Tummy Monster |
| Best News & Current Affairs | Best Short Film & Animation |
| **Kids on the Psychiatric Ward – BBC Scotland/BBC One**; Hunting the Whisky Bandits – BBC Scotland/BBC One; Salmond and Sturgeon: A Troubled Union – Firecrest Films/BBC Scotland | **Parental Advice**; The Flowers Stand Silently, Witnessing; My Dad and the Volcano; Seeking |
| Best Single Documentary | Best Television Scripted |
| **Imagine...The Academy of Armando – BBC Studios/BBC One**; From Roger Moore with Love – WhyNow Studios/BBC Two; Lena Zavaroni: The Forgotten Child Star – Specky Productions/BBC Scotland | **Lockerbie: A Search for Truth – Carnival Films/Sky Atlantic**; An t-Eilean/The Island – Black Camel Pictures/BBC Alba; The Tattooist of Auschwitz – Synchronicity Films, Sky Studios, All3Media International/Sky Atlantic |
| Best Writer (Film/Television) | Audience Award |
| **Laura Carreira – On Falling**; Amy Liptrot, Nora Fingscheidt – The Outrun; David Harrower – Lockerbie: A Search for Truth; Gregory Burke – Rebus | **Sheli McCoy (Sabre) – Gladiators**; Ashley Jensen – Shetland; Gary Lamont – Rivals; Kiran Sonia Sawar – Slow Horses; Ncuti Gatwa – Doctor Who; Richard Rankin – Rebus |

=== Outstanding Contribution awards ===
- Outstanding Contribution to Film and Television – Ewan McGregor
- Outstanding Contribution to the Scottish Industry – Location, Location, Location
