= Extraordinary (TV series) =

British superhero comedy television series

- Genre: Superhero; Comedy
- Created by: Emma Moran
- Written by: Emma Moran
- Starring: Máiréad Tyers; Sofia Oxenham; Bilal Hasna; Luke Rollason
- Composer: Will Gregory
- Country of origin: United Kingdom
- Original language: English
- No. of series: 2
- No. of episodes: 16

Production
- Executive producers: Sally Woodward Gentle; Lee Morris; Charles Dawson; Johanna Devereaux
- Producer: Charles Palmer
- Running time: 27–33 minutes
- Production company: Sid Gentle Films

Original release
- Network: Disney+
- Release: 25 January 2023 – 6 March 2024

Extraordinary is a British superhero comedy television series created by Emma Moran. It premiered on the Disney+ Star platform internationally, Star+ in Latin America and Hulu in the United States, on 25 January 2023. The series received generally positive reviews from critics and was renewed for a second series on 23 January 2023, ahead of its premiere. The second series was released on 6 March 2024 on Hulu in the United States and on Disney+ in other territories. In January 2025, the series was cancelled after two seasons.

== Premise ==
Extraordinary is set in a world where every person develops a superpower upon turning 18. The series follows Jen, a 25-year-old woman who has yet to manifest any ability, making her an anomaly in a society where superpowers are the norm.

Jen works in a costume shop and lives with her best friend Carrie, who can channel the spirits of the dead, and Carrie's boyfriend Kash, who can rewind time and aspires to be a superhero. Their lives are disrupted by a shapeshifter who had been trapped as a cat for several years and has no memory of his previous life, quickly earning the nickname Jizzlord. As Jen searches for her own power, the series explores themes of identity, belonging, and adulthood through a comedic lens.

== Cast and characters ==
=== Main ===
- Máiréad Tyers as Jen, a 25-year-old costume-shop worker who doesn't have any superpowers. She struggles to deal with it in a world where almost everyone develops a superpower at the age of 18.
- Sofia Oxenham as Carrie, Jen's best friend and flatmate who can channel spirits of the dead. She works at a legal firm.
- Bilal Hasna as Kash, Carrie's boyfriend and Jen's other flatmate. He can rewind time and has aspirations of being a serious superhero.
- Luke Rollason as Jizzlord, a shapeshifter who was stuck as a cat for several years. Jen adopted (and named) him before learning what he was but allowed him to stay when it was revealed he had no memory of his previous life.

=== Supporting ===
- Siobhán McSweeney as Mary, Jen's mother who can control technology.
- Robbie Gee as Ian, Jen's stepdad who can sense emotions in other people.
- Safia Oakley-Green as Andy (series 1), Jen's half sister who is super strong.
- Ned Porteous as Luke (series 1), a guy Jen occasionally dates who has the power of flight.
- Darcey Porter-Cassidy as Ange, Jen's boss at the costume shop. She's in her 50s but looks like a preteen.
- Eros Vlahos as Gordon, a guy Jen goes on a date with who has the power to induce orgasms with a touch.
- Ardal O'Hanlon as Martin, Jen's deceased father (voice).
- Sam Haygarth as Seb (series 1), a member of Kash's team with the power to summon fish.
- Chris Lew Kum Hoi as Gregor, a member of Kash's team with the power of super speed.
- Shaun Mason as Randall, a member of Kash's team with a 3D-printing anus.
- Abraham Popoola as Ade, a member of Kash's team who can phase through walls.
- Patricia Allison as Hannah, another person without powers.
- Rosa Robson as Nora (series 2), a telepath from Jizzlord's previous life.
- Julian Barratt as George (series 2), Jen's power coach with the ability to enter mindspaces.
- Kwaku Mills as Clark (series 2), Carrie's coworker with the power of duplication.

== Episodes ==
=== Series overview ===
| Series | Episodes | Originally released |
|---|---|---|
| 1 | 8 | 25 January 2023 |
| 2 | 8 | 6 March 2024 |

=== Series 1 (2023) ===
| No. overall | No. in series | Title | Directed by | Written by | Original release date |
|---|---|---|---|---|---|
| 1 | 1 | "Have Nots" | Toby MacDonald | Emma Moran | 25 January 2023 |
In a world where all individuals develop a superpower at the age of 18, 25-year-old Jen remains one of the few adults without any ability. Living in London with her best friend Carrie and Carrie's boyfriend Kash, she struggles with feelings of exclusion and inadequacy in a society where powers define identity and status. The episode establishes Jen’s workplace at a costume shop and her ongoing attempts to understand why she has not developed a power.
| 2 | 2 | "Magic Bullets" | Toby MacDonald | Emma Moran | 25 January 2023 |
Jen’s friends attempt to force the emergence of her power by exposing her to controlled stressors, reflecting the common belief in their world that abilities can be triggered. The experiment fails, reinforcing Jen’s lack of powers. Meanwhile, Jen discovers that the stray cat she previously adopted is in fact Jizzlord, a shapeshifter who had been trapped in feline form for several years and has no memory of his past life.
| 3 | 3 | "Dead End Jobs" | Toby MacDonald | Emma Moran | 25 January 2023 |
Carrie is assigned to channel a deceased musician during a legal consultation, revealing ethical tensions in her ability to communicate with the dead. She seeks Jen’s support in managing the situation. At the same time, Kash begins assembling a group of aspiring vigilantes to form a superhero team, while Jizzlord attempts to adjust to human life and rebuild basic social understanding.
| 4 | 4 | "Pet Project" | Toby MacDonald | Emma Moran | 25 January 2023 |
Jen attempts to help Jizzlord recover fragments of his memory by exposing him to familiar environments and experiences. Kash prepares for the public debut of his newly formed vigilante team, prioritising his ambitions over his relationship with Carrie. Carrie, increasingly frustrated and emotionally conflicted, seeks other outlets for her impulses while tensions within the group grow.
| 5 | 5 | "The Jen Show" | Jennifer Sheridan | Emma Moran | 25 January 2023 |
Jen and Carrie revisit their former school, where a classmate with memory-based abilities exposes uncomfortable truths about Jen’s past behaviour as a friend. This causes a strain in their relationship. Meanwhile, Kash struggles with the failure of his vigilante team’s public debut, prompting reflection on his aspirations and leadership.
| 6 | 6 | "The Real Power Is The Friends We Made" | Nadira Amrani | Emma Moran | 25 January 2023 |
Efforts are made to repair the fractured friendship between Jen and Carrie, with Jizzlord acting as a mediator. However, Jen forms a new friendship with another individual without powers, highlighting her search for belonging outside the dominant superpowered social structure. Kash attempts to reconcile with members of his vigilante group following earlier failures.
| 7 | 7 | "The Merry Monarch" | Jennifer Sheridan | Emma Moran | 25 January 2023 |
Jen attempts to earn money by entering Jizzlord into a cat show, which forces her to confront her emotional attachment to him. Kash prioritises vigilante activities over his relationship with Carrie, leading to further strain between them. Carrie, left isolated, becomes involved with the spirit of a deceased royal figure she channels, escalating her emotional instability.
| 8 | 8 | "Surprise!" | Jennifer Sheridan | Emma Moran | 25 January 2023 |
Jen attempts to redefine her relationship with Jizzlord following an unexpected kiss, but the situation becomes complicated when Luke, a man from her past, reappears. Carrie tries to end her relationship with Kash, but he repeatedly uses his time-rewinding ability to avoid the breakup. The series concludes on a cliffhanger when a young boy encounters Jizzlord and suggests he resembles his father, raising questions about Jizzlord’s past identity.

=== Series 2 (2024) ===
| No. overall | No. in series | Title | Directed by | Written by | Original release date |
|---|---|---|---|---|---|
| 9 | 1 | "The Void" | Toby MacDonald | Emma Moran | 6 March 2024 |
Following the events of the first series, Jen and Jizzlord struggle with the emergence of Jizz’s previously unknown family, which disrupts their living situation and emotional stability. Kash and Carrie continue to adjust to their breakup, navigating the practical and emotional consequences of separating while still sharing social circles. In parallel, Jen begins attending therapy in an effort to understand why she remains without a superpower, introducing a more introspective strand to her character arc.
| 10 | 2 | "Hello Stranger" | Toby MacDonald | Emma Moran | 6 March 2024 |
Jizzlord’s wife Nora and son Alfie arrive unexpectedly, forcing Jen to confront unresolved tensions around Jizz’s past identity and loyalties. Nora’s presence introduces suspicion regarding her motives and her relationship with Jizzlord’s former life. Meanwhile, Carrie pressures Kash to secure stable employment, leading him to become her assistant, further complicating their post-breakup dynamic and shared dependency.
| 11 | 3 | "The Exorcism of Carrie Jackson" | Toby MacDonald | Emma Moran | 6 March 2024 |
Encouraged by Jen to embrace single life, Carrie attends a Halloween party where she channels a deceased Hollywood actress who subsequently possesses her. This forces Jen and Kash to attempt an improvised exorcism, combining their limited understanding of the supernatural consequences of Carrie’s ability. Concurrently, Jizzlord becomes overwhelmed by resurfacing aspects of his former life and temporarily reverts to cat form, experiencing a disorienting and dangerous encounter.
| 12 | 4 | "Ready to Rumble" | Toby MacDonald | Emma Moran | 6 March 2024 |
Jizzlord attempts to reconnect with a former friend in an effort to reconstruct his pre-cat identity, while Jen’s ongoing conflict with Nora escalates during Nora’s public book launch. Carrie explores new romantic prospects, including an encounter with an invisible man, reflecting her attempt to move on from Kash. Kash, meanwhile, experiences a creative block that undermines his ambition to develop a serious superhero persona.
| 13 | 5 | "Meet the Parent" | Jennifer Sheridan | Emma Moran | 6 March 2024 |
Jen reflects on a disastrous family dinner during therapy, highlighting ongoing difficulties in her relationship with her mother and stepfather. Jizzlord attempts to demonstrate to Nora that Jen is a trustworthy influence in his life through a structured evaluation of her character. Elsewhere, Carrie and Kash briefly agree to set each other up with new partners, but the arrangement quickly becomes emotionally complicated.
| 14 | 6 | "Jen V Nora: Ultimate Showdown" | Jennifer Sheridan | Emma Moran | 6 March 2024 |
Jen and Jizz attend Alfie’s birthday party, where tensions between Jen and Nora escalate into a direct confrontation. Carrie reacts to Kash’s growing closeness with his colleague Clark by attempting to assert control over social situations involving Kash’s friends. A major revelation occurs when Jizzlord learns that Nora and his former best friend had an affair prior to his disappearance, and that Alfie is not his biological son, explaining his memory loss and emotional trauma.
| 15 | 7 | "Be the Daddy You Want to See in the World" | Jennifer Sheridan | Emma Moran | 6 March 2024 |
Jen confronts unresolved issues relating to her absent father, who ultimately limits their contact following increasing tension. After crossing professional boundaries with her therapist, Jen’s emotional state becomes increasingly unstable, influencing her behaviour toward Jizzlord. Carrie and Kash begin to reassess their relationship, recognising lingering attachment despite their breakup and considering a return to friendship.
| 16 | 8 | "Well, Goodbye Forever" | Jennifer Sheridan | Emma Moran | 6 March 2024 |
Kash stages a performance of his musical "The Vigilante", marking a culmination of his superhero ambitions. Jen is advised by her therapist that accessing her power requires severing her emotional dependence on her father, leading to a final conversation and farewell. At a subsequent gathering, Jen attempts again to discover her ability without success. She is later sent to deliver a microwave into the Void, but is accidentally pushed inside by Kash, becoming trapped in an unfamiliar but seemingly recognisable environment, ending the series on a cliffhanger.

== Production ==
Emma Moran developed Extraordinary while completing her Master of Arts in Screenwriting at the University of Manchester, from which she graduated in 2020. Alongside Wedding Season, Extraordinary was on the first slate of UK productions to be commissioned by Disney+ under the Star brand, as announced in April 2021. Sally Woodward Gentle, Lee Morris, and Charles Dawson of Sid Gentle Films as well as Johanna Devereaux of Disney+ executive produced the series. Charlie Palmer served as producer. Toby MacDonald and Jennifer Sheridan directed across both series'. Episode six in series one was directed by Nadia Amrani.

The cast were announced in December 2021, with Máiréad Tyers set to lead the series alongside Sofia Oxenham, Bilal Hasna, and Luke Rollason. Also joining the cast were Siobhán McSweeney, Safia Oakley-Green, and Robbie Gee. At the 2023 Edinburgh Television Festival, it was announced Julian Barratt, Rosa Robson, and Kwaku Mills had joined the cast of Extraordinary for its second season. Derek Jacobi would also make a voice cameo.

Principal photography took place in London.

== Release ==
First-look images for the series were released in November 2022. A trailer was released in December 2022, providing the first full preview of the series’ premise and characters.

The first series premiered on 25 January 2023, and consisted of eight episodes released simultaneously across Disney+ internationally, Star+ in Latin America, and Hulu in the United States. The series was renewed for a second series prior to its premiere.

In late 2023, Disney+ entered into a licensing agreement with ITV to make several of its titles, including Extraordinary, available on the UK streaming platform ITVX, with additional planned linear broadcast on ITV2. The first series was made available on ITVX on 12 February 2024.

The second series premiered on 6 March 2024.

In January 2025, it was confirmed that the series would not be renewed beyond two series, effectively concluding the show.

== Reception ==
=== Critical response ===
For the first series, Rotten Tomatoes reported an approval rating of 100% based on 23 reviews, with an average rating of 7.10/10. The site's critics consensus stated, "Amiable and cleverly constructed, Extraordinary grounds the fantastical and makes it all the more accessible and thrilling as a result." On Metacritic, the series has a weighted average score of 74 out of 100 based on 9 critic reviews, indicating "generally favorable reviews".

Critical commentary highlighted the series’ use of the superhero genre to explore everyday life and relationships. Judy Berman of Time described it as an "instant classic among superhero comedies", noting that it "combines and tweaks familiar tropes into something genuinely unique". Keith Watson of Metro awarded the series 4 out of 5 stars, praising its subversion of superhero conventions and comparing its tone to The Boys, albeit with a smaller production scale. Polly Conway of Common Sense Media also gave the series 4 out of 5 stars, describing it as an "amusing teen comedy".

=== Accolades ===
Extraordinary was among 200 television productions to receive the ReFrame Stamp for 2022–2023, an award administered by the gender equity coalition ReFrame and IMDbPro recognising productions with demonstrated gender-balanced hiring practices across key creative roles.

The series won Best Comedy Programme at the 2023 Broadcast Digital Awards. At the 2024 Royal Television Society Programme Awards, the series was nominated for Best Scripted Comedy, while Máiréad Tyers received a nomination for Best Female Comedy Performance.
