= Enniskillen Royal Grammar School =

Coordinates: 54.351297°N 7.654477°W

Location
- Lough Shore Site - 1 Lough Shore Road, BT74 5HD; Cooper Crescent Site - 1 Cooper Crescent, BT74, 6DQ; Enniskillen; Northern Ireland

Information
- Type: Grammar School
- Motto: Latin: Perstare et Praestare (Persevere and Excel)
- Established: 1 September 2016; 9 years ago
- Principal: Elizabeth Armstrong
- Deputy Principal: Phillip Beddard
- Teaching staff: Roughly 80
- Gender: Mixed
- Age: 11 to 18
- Enrollment: Roughly 900
- Colours: Red, gold and navy blue
- Nickname: ERGS
- Website: enniskillenroyalgs.com

Enniskillen Royal Grammar School, located in Enniskillen, County Fermanagh, Northern Ireland, is an academically selective, co-educational, non-denominational voluntary grammar school. The school opened its doors on 1 September 2016. Two former Enniskillen grammar schools (Portora Royal School and the Enniskillen Collegiate Grammar School) were amalgamated to form the school. It is located on two sites (the former sites of Portora Royal School and the Enniskillen Collegiate Grammar School).

== History ==
=== History of Portora Royal School ===
Portora Royal School was one of the public schools founded by a royal charter in 1608, by James I, making it one of the oldest schools in Ireland at the time of its closure. Originally called Enniskillen Royal School, the school was established some ten years after the Royal Decree, in 1618, 15 miles outside Enniskillen at Ballybalfour, before moving to Enniskillen in 1661. It was not until 1778 that the school moved to its final location on Portora Hill, Enniskillen, where the nucleus of the later all-boys school was built. The school admitted a mixture of boarders and day pupils for much of its history, but became a day school in the 1990s.

=== History of Enniskillen Collegiate Grammar School ===
Enniskillen Collegiate Grammar School was founded under the name the "Enniskillen Royal School for Girls" in 1916. The name changed when the school was taken over by the Fermanagh Regional Education Committee in 1925. The school opened at its former east Enniskillen location in October 1931. It originally catered for eighty-eight pupils, with only four classrooms. It was the first grammar school in the province to be erected by a public body. Pupils were originally admitted using the 11+, however, this was abolished in 2009 and replaced with Common Entrance Assessments. Over the years, many extensions were made to the original building and from September 2006 to June 2007 the school celebrated seventy-five years on the site. At its closure, approximately 500 females, aged between 11 and 18 years old, attended the school and the principal was Elizabeth Armstrong, who later went on to become the principal of ERGS.

=== Formation of Enniskillen Royal Grammar School ===
A proposal by the Department of Education to merge Portora Royal School with the Enniskillen Collegiate Grammar School to form "Enniskillen Royal Grammar School" was approved by the Minister of Education, John O'Dowd, in June 2015, but the matter was taken to the High Court in October 2015 due to local opposition. However, the High Court bid to stop the amalgamation of the two Enniskillen grammar schools failed.

Subsequently, Portora Royal School and the Enniskillen Collegiate Grammar School closed at the end of the 2015/2016 school year. Enniskillen Royal Grammar School then opened on 1 September 2016. Initially, the school is operating on two sites. However, there are plans to build a single new school at the current Lough Shore site.

== Curriculum ==
=== Key Stage 3 ===
In year 8, pupils study Art and Design, Drama, English, French, Games, Geography, History, Home Economics, IT, Mathematics, Music, Personal Development, Physical Education, Religious Education, Science, and Technology and Design.
In year 9, pupils study the above, but also choose between German and Spanish.
In year 10, pupils study the same subjects as in year 9, but with Biology, Chemistry and Physics instead of Science.

=== Key Stage 4 ===
Pupils must study nine or ten GCSEs, all offered from CCEA.
Pupils are required to study GCSE English Language, GCSE Mathematics, GCSE Science (Double Award), and either GCSE Learning for Life and Work, or GCSE Religious Studies.
Pupils must choose four GCSEs from the following: GCSE Art and Design, GCSE Business Studies, GCSE Digital Technology - Programming, GCSE Drama, GCSE English Literature, GCSE French, GCSE Geography, GCSE German, GCSE History, GCSE Home Economics: Food and Nutrition, GCSE Moving Image Arts, GCSE Music, GCSE Physical Education, GCSE Spanish, and GCSE Technology and Design.
Pupils who can use mathematics to a very high standard are offered GCSE Further Mathematics.

=== Post-16 ===
Enniskillen Royal Grammar School offers AS and A2 Levels as post-16 qualifications. Options include: Art, Biology, Chemistry, Digital Technology, Economics, English Literature, Further Mathematics, French, Geography, German, Government and Politics, Health and Social Care, History, Life and Health Sciences, Mathematics, Moving Image Arts, Music, Nutrition and Food Science, Performing Arts, Physics, Religious Studies, Spanish, Sports Science and the Active Leisure Industry, and Technology and Design.
A BTEC in Engineering is also offered.

== Sports ==
Rowing and rugby are the biggest sports at Enniskillen Royal Grammar School.

The school's rowing club has established itself as one of the top rowing clubs in all of the UK and Ireland. The club is based at the grounds of the school's Lough Shore site, at the Portora Boat House. Students from all schools in the local area are allowed to join the club. Around eight volunteers, supported by the head coach, coach the club. Two members of the coaching team, Derek Holland (Head coach) and Iain Kennedy, are former Olympians.

On Friday 22 September 2017, the outstanding level of success achieved by the boat club was recognised in an event at Enniskillen Castle Museum where the Chairman of Fermanagh and Omagh District Council, Stephen McCann, presented the rowing coach, Derek Holland, with a trophy to mark the occasion.

== See also ==
- Portora Castle
- Portora Royal School
- Enniskillen Collegiate Grammar School
