= How to Kill Your Family =

British television series

- Created by: Emma Moran
- Based on: How To Kill Your Family by Bella Mackie
- Written by: Emma Moran
- Starring: Anya Taylor-Joy; Clive Owen; Orlando Norman; David Shields
- Country of origin: United Kingdom
- Original language: English

Production
- Executive producers: Anya Taylor-Joy; Bella Mackie; Sally Woodward Gentle; Lee Morris; Emma Moran; Lizzie Rusbridger
- Production companies: Sid Gentle Films; LadyKiller

Original release
- Network: Netflix

How To Kill Your Family is an upcoming black comedy thriller television series starring Anya Taylor-Joy. It is developed and co-written by Emma Moran from the Bella Mackie's novel of the same name, which is loosely based on the movie Kind Hearts and Coronets.

== Premise ==
The estranged daughter of a ruthless social-climbing billionaire plots her way to a denied inheritance.

== Cast ==
- Anya Taylor-Joy as Grace Bernard
- Clive Owen
- Orlando Norman
- David Shields
- Arlet Fabregà

== Production ==
=== Development ===
The eight-part series was commissioned by Netflix in August 2024. It is adapted by Emma Moran from the novel by British writer Bella Mackie of the same name. That month, Anya Taylor-Joy was cast in the lead role. The series has executive producers including Mackie, Taylor-Joy, Moran Sally Woodward Gentle, Lee Morris, and Lizzie Rusbridger, and is being produced by Sid Gentle and LadyKiller. A lawsuit with StudioCanal who own the rights to Kind Hearts and Coronets was settled in October 2025.

=== Casting ===
Clive Owen, Orlando Norman and David Shields joined Anya Taylor Joy in the cast in August 2026.

=== Filming ===
First-look images from filming in London were released to the media in October 2026.
