= Tummy Monster =

British horror comedy film

- Directed by: Ciaran Lyons
- Screenplay by: Ciaran Lyons; Lorn Macdonald; Orlando Norman
- Produced by: Beth Allan
- Starring: Lorn Macdonald; Orlando Norman; Michael Akinsulire
- Cinematography: David Liddell
- Production company: Forest of Black
- Release date: 2024
- Country: United Kingdom
- Language: English

Tummy Monster is a 2024 Scottish black comedy psychological horror film directed by Ciaran Lyons and starring Lorn Macdonald, Orlando Norman, and Michael Akinsulire. It was nominated for Best Film at the 2025 British Academy Scotland Awards.

== Premise ==
A Glaswegian tattoo artist gets involved in a battle of wills with an American pop star and his minder, after being refused a selfie. The majority of the film focuses upon an unusual tummy-rubbing game that somewhat resembles chicken, and operates upon the basis of mutually assured destruction.

== Cast ==
- Lorn Macdonald as Tales
- Michael Akinsulire as Truth
- Orlando Norman as Tummy
- Dawn Sievewright as Francesca
- Gudrun Roy as Shimmy

== Production ==
The film is the feature length debut of writer-director Ciaran Lyons and stars Lorn Macdonald, Orlando Norman and Michael Akinsulire, with Macdonald and Norman also credited with collaborating on the script.

Produced by Beth Allan from Scottish company Forest of Black, Principal photography took place over five days in Glasgow with director of photography David Liddell.

== Release ==
The film premiered at the 2024 Glasgow Film Festival in February 2024. It was later also shown at international festivals such as the Austin Film Festival and the Brussels International Fantastic Film Festival. It was later shown on a British tour of independent cinemas in 2025.

== Reception ==
The film was nominated for Best Film at the 2025 British Academy Scotland Awards. It won the Méliès d'Argent for Best European Feature Film at the 2025 Lund International Fantastic Film Festival. It was awarded Best Feature Film at the 2025 Spirit of Independence Film Festival, as well as Best Performance in a Feature Film for Lorn Macdonald.
