= The Map That Leads to You =

2025 film by Lasse Hallström

- Release poster
- Directed by: Lasse Hallström
- Screenplay by: Vera Herbert; Les Bohem
- Story by: Les Bohem
- Based on: The Map That Leads to You by J.P. Monninger
- Produced by: Marty Bowen; Wyck Godfrey; John Fischer; Isaac Klausner; Adrián Guerra
- Starring: KJ Apa; Madelyn Cline; Sofia Wylie; Madison Thompson; Orlando Norman; Josh Lucas
- Cinematography: Elías M. Félix
- Edited by: Brad Turner; Douglas Crise
- Music by: Sarah Trevino
- Production company: Temple Hill Entertainment
- Distributed by: Amazon MGM Studios
- Release date: August 20, 2025
- Running time: 98 minutes
- Country: United States
- Language: English

The Map That Leads to You is a 2025 American romantic drama film directed by Lasse Hallström. It is an adaptation of the novel of the same name by J.P. Monninger, and stars Madelyn Cline, KJ Apa, Sofia Wylie, Madison Thompson, Orlando Norman, and Josh Lucas.

Heather Mulgrew's European adventure with her two college friends takes an unexpected turn upon meeting New Zealand backpacker Jack-sparking an unforeseen romance neither of them saw coming.

Released by Amazon MGM Studios onto Amazon Prime Video on August 20, 2025, the film received generally mixed reviews from critics.

== Plot ==
Before taking a banking job in New York City, Heather Mulgrew, after graduating from college in Boston, travels to Europe with her friends Amy and Connie. On the night train to Barcelona, she meets Jack, a New Zealander who is following the diary of his great-grandfather, who was stationed in Europe after World War II. The two are reading the same book, The Sun Also Rises by Ernest Hemingway, so begin to discuss it.

They arrive in Barcelona, where Amy mentions they have been invited to a nightclub by Viktor, with whom Amy hooked up on the train. Jack goes to the club to meet Heather, along with his friend Raef, who Connie takes an interest in. Hitting it off, Jack and Heather break into a tower of the Barcelona harbor cable car, where they kiss. The next day, Amy shows up with her money, passport, cell phone, and jacket stolen by Viktor. Jack, Raef, Heather, Amy, and Connie search for Viktor and retrieve the items from him. They go on a short trip down to Cadaqués with the money they took from the thief Viktor's residence.

Connie leaves a day later with Raef, while Amy sets out on the Camino de Santiago. Jack and Heather drive to Bilbao. She has a plane ticket home, as she is due to start her new job in two weeks and plans to move into her new apartment beforehand. However, Jack persuades Heather not to take the flight. After a tour of the Guggenheim Museum, they spend the night together. During the running of the bulls in Pamplona, Jack injures his shoulder so is treated in the hospital.

In Porto they visit, among other places, the Livraria Lello. While Heather is sleeping next to Jack on the bus, he receives a call from the Pamplona hospital, stating that they have discovered an abnormality in his scans. In Rome, Heather and Jack argue over their differing plans for the future. After storming off, Jack spontaneously decides to accompany Heather to the US.

At the airport, Jack receives a call from an oncology clinic in Rome informing him that his test results are in. Jack tells Heather how much he enjoyed the trip and leaves, causing a distraught Heather to board the plane to New York alone. She sends him a message, with Jack simply responding "I'm really sorry" before blocking her. Heather returns home to Texas for Christmas, questioning if she should stay in New York. Heather's dad tells her not to be upset at Jack, as he gave her the gift of freedom.

Heather and Amy return to Barcelona as bridesmaids for Connie's wedding to Raef. Raef gives Heather a letter from Jack. He explains his disappearance was because he did not want her to see him die of cancer and wishes she would plan a future without him.

Jack refers to the journal as the map that led him to her. So, Heather recognizes a line from the letter as a line from the diary, referring to a festival in Santa Pau. Encouraged by Connie and Amy, she travels to Santa Pau, where she finds Jack and they confess their love for each other.

== Cast ==
- Madelyn Cline as Heather Mulgrew
- KJ Apa as Jack
- Sofia Wylie as Connie
- Madison Thompson as Amy
- Orlando Norman as Raef
- Josh Lucas as Greg Mulgrew

== Production ==
The film is directed by Lasse Hallström and is an adaptation of the novel of the same name by J.P. Monninger. It has been adapted by Les Bohem and Vera Herbert. The film is from Amazon MGM Studios and producers include Temple Hill Entertainment's Marty Bowen, Wyck Godfrey, Isaac Klausner and John Fischer. The cast is led by Madelyn Cline and KJ Apa, and also includes Sofia Wylie, Madison Thompson, Orlando Norman and Josh Lucas. Music composed by Sarah Trevino.

Principal photography took place in Terrassa, Spain in 2024.

== Release ==
The Map That Leads to You was released by Amazon MGM Studios on August 20, 2025.

== Reception ==
On the review aggregator website Rotten Tomatoes, 39% of 38 critics' reviews are positive, with an average rating of 5.1/10. The website's consensus reads: "Offering little lasting impact despite its attractive cast and scenic backdrops, The Map That Leads to You is a glossy, picturesque, and ultimately underwhelming love story." Metacritic, which uses a weighted average, assigned the film a score of 48 out of 100, based on 11 critics, indicating "mixed or average" reviews.
