= Peter Webb (Irish cricketer) =

Irish cricketer

Personal information
- Full name: Peter Mitchell Webb
- Born: 5 February 1932 (age 94); Dublin, Leinster, Ireland
- Batting: Right-handed
- Bowling: Right-arm medium

Domestic team information
- Years: Team
- 1953: Ireland

Career statistics
Competition	First-class
Matches	2
Runs scored	3
Batting average	3.00
100s/50s	0/0
Top score	3*
Balls bowled	167
Wickets	4
Bowling average	14.75
5 wickets in innings	0
10 wickets in match	0
Best bowling	2/11
Catches/stumpings	3/–
- Source: Cricinfo, 28 October 2018

Peter Mitchell Webb (born 5 February 1932) is a former Irish first-class cricketer.

Webb was born at Dublin and was first educated in the city at Avoca School, before attending Portora Royal School in Northern Ireland. Playing his club cricket for Dublin University, Webb made his debut in first-class cricket for Ireland against Glamorgan at Margam on Ireland's 1953 tour of England and Wales. Later that year, he played a second first-class match against Scotland at Belfast. Playing as a medium pace bowler, Webb took 4 wickets in his two first-class matches. He appeared once more for Ireland, in a minor match against Lancashire in 1954. Webb later played club cricket for Pembroke. Over twenty years after he last played for Ireland, he worked as an executive for Rothmans (Ireland), with the company sponsoring the visits of the touring West Indians in 1976, and the touring Australians in 1977.
