= Madelyn Cline =

American actress (born 1997)

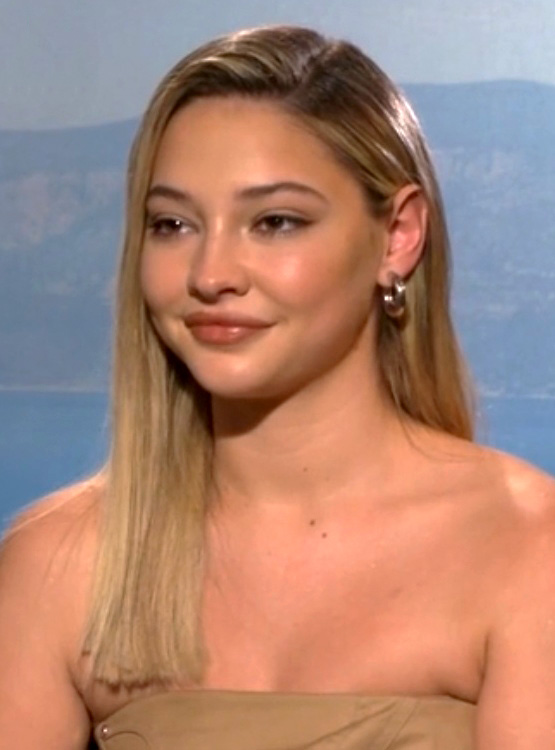
- Cline in 2022
- Born: December 21, 1997 (age 28); Goose Creek, South Carolina, U.S.
- Education: Pinewood Preparatory School; Woodward Academy; College of Charleston (no degree)
- Occupations: Actress; model
- Years active: 2009–present
- Height: 168 cm (5 ft 6 in)

Madelyn Cline (born December 21, 1997) is an American actress and model. She is best known for her roles in the Netflix teen drama series Outer Banks (2020–2026), in Rian Johnson's mystery film Glass Onion: A Knives Out Mystery (2022), and in the slasher film I Know What You Did Last Summer (2025).

== Early life ==
Cline was born on December 21, 1997, to estate agent Pam and engineer Mark and was raised in Goose Creek, South Carolina, near Charleston. She briefly was enrolled in college at Coastal Carolina University, but dropped out and moved to Los Angeles to further pursue acting. As a child, she appeared in a television commercial for a Chuck E. Cheese's.

== Career ==
She got her start with Lewis Models & Talent agency in Charleston and, at age 10, Cline participated in AMTC modeling and talent competition. She subsequently appeared on the cover of Parent and Parent & Child magazines. Cline spent some of her early summers in New York City working on television commercials and print ads for T-Mobile, Flow Automotive, Next clothing and Sunny D. She later got minor roles such as Chloe in Boy Erased (2018) and Taylor Watts in Vice Principals (2016–2017) She also had small recurring roles in The Originals (2017) and Stranger Things (2017).

In 2020, Cline began starring as Sarah Cameron in the Netflix teen adventure drama Outer Banks. The series has received positive reviews from critics, with her role considered a breakout. Cline next starred in Rian Johnson's mystery comedy Glass Onion: A Knives Out Mystery, released on Netflix in 2022, to critical acclaim.

As a model, Cline has appeared in ad campaigns for American Girl, Toys "R" Us, American Eagle, Stella McCartney, Versace, Elle, and Cosmo. In 2023, she became a brand ambassador for Tommy Hilfiger and appeared in the "Summer Essentials" lifestyle campaign with Mason Gooding.

In 2025, Cline was cast in the thriller film Day Drinker, alongside Johnny Depp and Penélope Cruz.

== Personal life ==
In June 2020 to October 2021, Cline announced she was in a relationship with her Outer Banks co-star Chase Stokes. She was then briefly linked to DJ Zack Bia from late 2021 to early 2022. From summer 2022 to July 2023, Cline was in a relationship with singer Jackson Guthy. She was then in a relationship with comedian Pete Davidson from September 2023 to July 2024. From April to June 2026, Cline was in a brief relationship with influencer Henry Smith.

Cline has stated that she struggled with an unspecified eating disorder and her body image as a teenager.

== Filmography ==
=== Film ===
| Year | Title | Role | Notes | Ref. |
|---|---|---|---|---|
| 2011 | 23rd Psalm: Redemption | Maya Smith | Short film | |
| 2012 | Children of Wax | Ashlyn | Short film | |
| 2014 | Bridge the Cap | Tanya | Short film | |
| 2016 | Savannah Sunrise | Willow | | |
| 2018 | Boy Erased | Chloe | | |
| 2020 | What Breaks the Ice | Emily | | |
| 2021 | This Is the Night | Sophia Larocca | | |
| 2022 | Glass Onion: A Knives Out Mystery | Whiskey | | |
| 2025 | I Know What You Did Last Summer | Danica Richards | | |
| 2025 | The Map That Leads to You | Heather Mulgrew | | |
| 2027 | The Comeback King | Missy | Filming | |
| 2027 | Day Drinker | Lorna | Post-production | |

=== Television ===
| Year | Title | Role | Notes | Ref. |
|---|---|---|---|---|
| 2016 | The Jury | Grace Alexander | Television film | |
| 2016–2017 | Vice Principals | Taylor Watts | 3 episodes | |
| 2017 | The Originals | Jessica | 3 episodes | |
| 2017 | Stranger Things | Tina | 2 episodes | |
| 2020–2026 | Outer Banks | Sarah Cameron | Main role | |

=== Music video appearances ===
| Year | Title | Artist | Role | Ref. |
|---|---|---|---|---|
| 2020 | "Hot Stuff" | Kygo featuring Donna Summer | Herself | |
| 2026 | "House Tour" | Sabrina Carpenter | Herself | |

== Awards and nominations ==
| Year | Ceremony | Award | Work | Result | Ref. |
|---|---|---|---|---|---|
| 2021 | MTV Movie & TV Awards | Best Kiss (shared with Chase Stokes) | Outer Banks | Won | |
| 2022 | Just Jared Jr Fan Awards | Favorite Young Actress | Glass Onion: A Knives Out Mystery | Nominated | |
| 2023 | Critics' Choice Movie Awards | Best Acting Ensemble | Glass Onion: A Knives Out Mystery | Won | |
| 2023 | Gold Derby Awards | Ensemble Cast (Note: Shared with Dave Bautista, Daniel Craig, Kathryn Hahn, Jessica Henwick, Jackie Hoffman, Kate Hudson, Janelle Monáe, Edward Norton, Leslie Odom Jr., Dallas Roberts, Noah Segan) | Glass Onion: A Knives Out Mystery | Nominated | |
| 2025 | Glamour Women of the Year Awards | Next Gen Icon Award | Career / Personal Honor | Won | |
