= Nottingham Playhouse =

Theatre in Nottingham, England

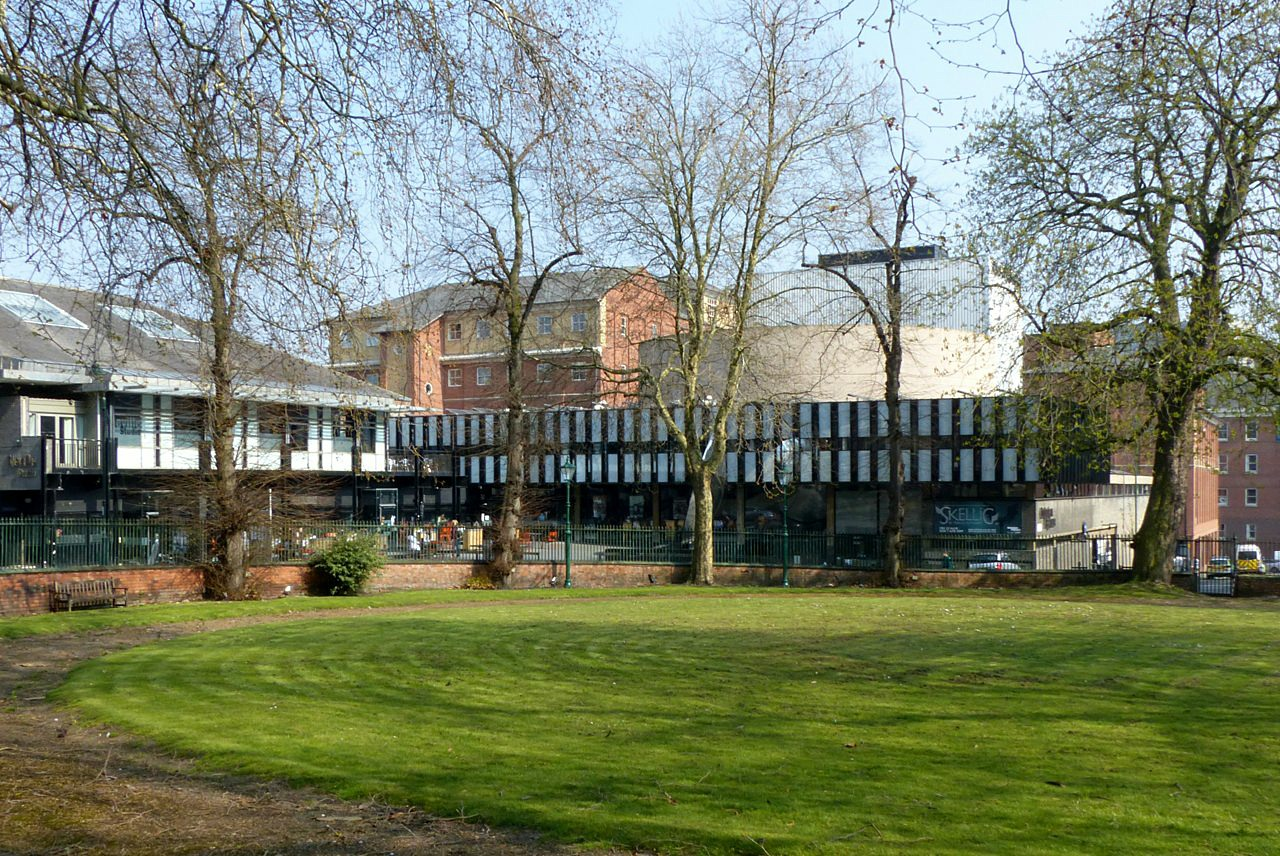
- A view of the playhouse
- Interactive map of Nottingham Playhouse
- Address: Wellington Circus, Nottingham, NG1 5AF
- Coordinates: 52.9537°N 1.1577°W
- Operator: Nottingham Playhouse Trust Ltd
- Capacity: 770 Main House; 100 (Neville Studio)
- Type: Proscenium
- Designation: Grade II* Listed Building
- Current use: Producing Theatre

Construction
- Opened: 1963
- Years active: 60 years
- Architect: Peter Moro

Website
- Nottingham Playhouse

Nottingham Playhouse is a theatre in Nottingham, England. It was first established as a repertory theatre in 1948 when it operated from a former cinema in Goldsmith Street. Directors during this period included Val May and Frank Dunlop. The current building opened in 1963.

== The building ==
The architect of the current theatre, constructed as an example of Modern architecture, was Peter Moro who had worked on the interior design of the Royal Festival Hall in London When the theatre was completed, it was controversial as it faces Nottingham Cathedral, designed in Gothic Revival style by Augustus Pugin. However, the buildings received a Civic Trust Award in 1965. Despite the modern external appearance and the circular auditorium walls, the theatre has a proscenium layout, seating an audience of 770.

During the 1980s, when the concrete interiors were out of fashion, the Playhouse suffered from insensitive "refurbishment" that sought to hide its character. Since 1996, it has been a Grade II* listed building and in 2004, the theatre was sympathetically restored and refurbished with a grant from the Heritage Lottery Fund.

The Sky Mirror sculpture by Anish Kapoor was installed between the theatre and the adjacent green space of Wellington Circus in 2001 at a cost of £1.25m (equivalent to £2,350,000 in 2025). In 2007 it won the Nottingham Pride of Place award in a public vote to determine the city's favourite landmark.

In 2014–15, Nottingham Playhouse underwent a complete environmental upgrade including insulation of the fly tower, secondary and double glazing and installing PV panels. The works were jointly funded by Arts Council England, Nottingham City Council, patron donations and philanthropist Sir Harry Djanogly. The award-winning works have been calculated to cut annual energy usage by over 35%.

In 2019, Nottingham Playhouse was named The Stage Regional Theatre of the Year. and in 2023 named UK Theatre's Most Welcoming Theatre for its access work.

== Performance history ==
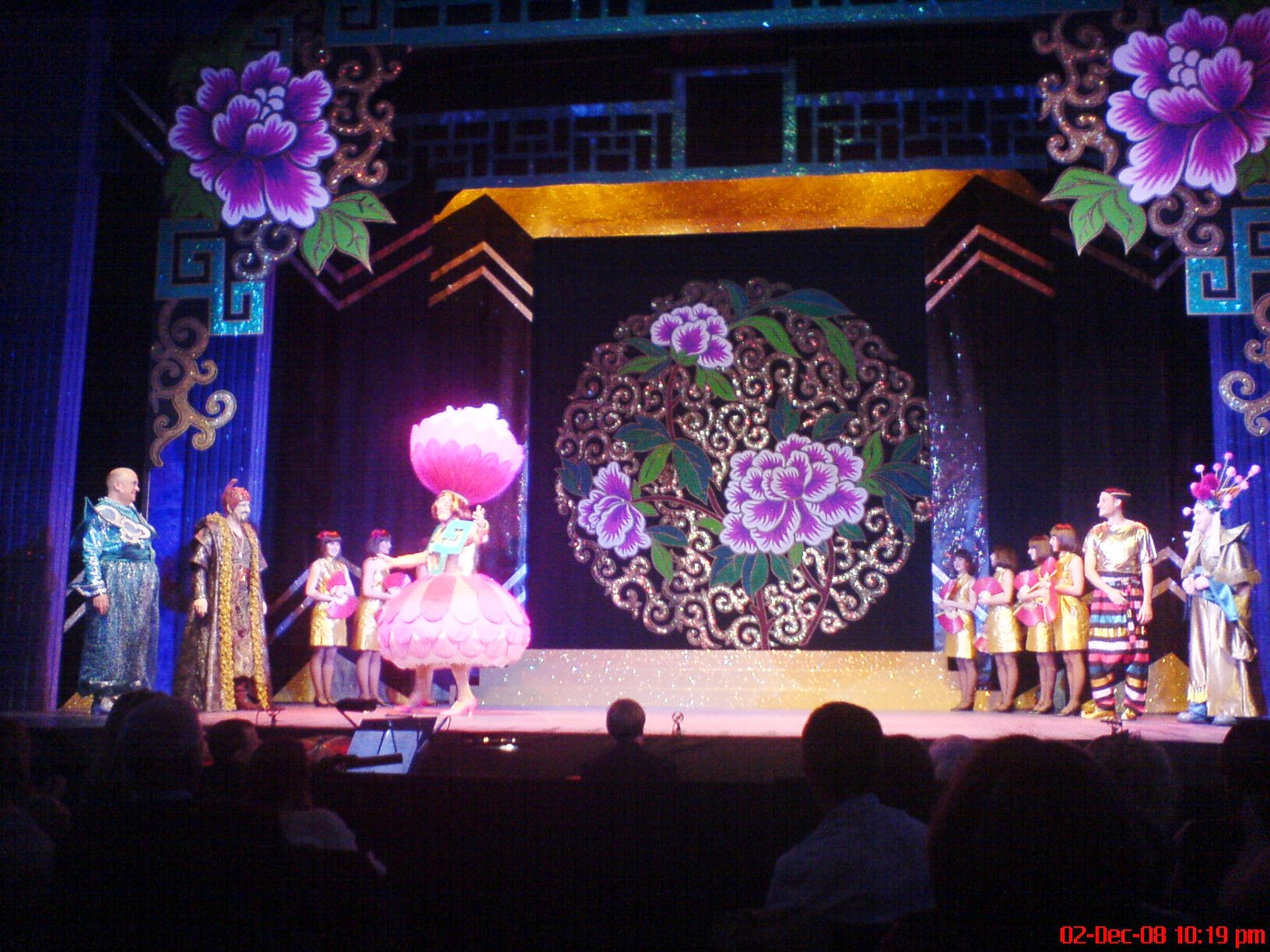
Aladdin Pantomime in 2008

The new theatre's artistic direction was shared between Frank Dunlop and actor John Neville with Peter Ustinov as associate.

The first production in the new theatre was Shakespeare's Coriolanus in a production by Tyrone Guthrie. This included a young Ian McKellen as Tullus Aufidius opposite Neville in the title role.

Subsequent artistic directors were Stuart Burge, Richard Eyre, Geoffrey Reeves, Richard Digby Day, Kenneth Alan Taylor, Pip Broughton, Martin Duncan and Giles Croft. The Playhouse is under the leadership of CEO Stephanie Sirr MBE, and Adam Penford, artistic director.

Nottingham Playhouse has a strong tradition of new works for children, both in the form of original writing and more recently in the form of classic pantomimes.

In common with most producing theatres, Nottingham Playhouse no longer has a repertory approach to programming, although it continues to create up to 13 new productions per annum. Its recent successes include Olivier awards-winning Punch by James Graham (Nottingham Playhouse, Young Vic, Apollo Theatre, Manhattan Theatre Club); A Christmas Carol by Mark Gatiss, from the novel by Charles Dickens (Nottingham Playhouse, Alexandra Palace, BBC4, Birmingham Rep); Old Big 'Ead in the Spirit of the Man, an homage to Nottingham legend Brian Clough; Rat Pack Confidential and Summer and Smoke, which both transferred to the West End; and The Burial at Thebes, which was part of the Barbican BITE season of autumn 2007 and toured the US in 2008. Its production of Oedipus, created by Steven Berkoff, toured to the Spoleto Festival, and a stage adaptation of On the Waterfront to the West End for an extended run.

In 2013, an adaptation of The Kite Runner by Matthew Spangler produced by Nottingham Playhouse became the theatre's best-selling ever drama up to that point in time. Autumn 2014 saw a successful UK tour of the piece and in summer 2022 a Broadway revival at the Helen Haynes Theatre, again directed by Giles Croft.

In 2014, 2015 and 2016, the Nottingham Playhouse and Headlong Theatre production of 1984 played at the Playhouse Theatre in London's West End to positive reviews. In Autumn 2015' it toured to Australia and the USA. In 2016' it was announced that the award-winning Nottingham Playhouse production of The Kite Runner would transfer to the West End from December 2016 to March 2017. The run was subsequently extended to the Playhouse Theatre in summer 2017 prior to a second UK tour.

In 2013, the theatre was awarded £1m from Arts Council England to undertake upgrading of the theatre's energy efficiency. Fiona Buffini's Mass Bolero marked 2014 - a tribute to Nottingham-born Jayne Torvill and Christopher Dean's gold medal-winning performance at the 1984 Winter Olympics in Sarajevo by the people of Nottingham. Over 800 Nottingham residents took part.

In 2017, Touched by Nottingham writer Stephen Lowe and starring Nottingham-born actress Vicky McClure became the Playhouse's then best-selling ever drama.

The highlight of its 70th anniversary 2018 season was The Madness of George III by Alan Bennett starring Mark Gatiss, Debra Gillett and Adrian Scarborough which achieved record-breaking box office figures and was seen by around 500,000 people internationally through NTLive.

In 2020–21 the theatre presented a range of live and digital productions including the world premiere of James Graham’s new play inspired by the COVID-19 pandemic, titled Bubble. Autumn 2021 saw the world premiere of Mark Gatiss’s adaptation of A Christmas Carol: A Ghost Story before a London transfer to the Alexandra Palace. A filmed version was released in cinemas in 2022. It was revived in 2023 starring Keith Allen and again transferred to Alexandra Palace.

In November 2023 it was announced the first production of Dear Evan Hansen outside of London's West End would be co-produced by ATG Productions and Nottingham Playhouse. The new production was directed by the Playhouse's artistic director Adam Penford and premiere at the Nottingham Playhouse on 9 September 2024 prior to a UK & Ireland Tour.

== Participation and education ==
Through its Theatre In education (TIE) company Roundabout and, since 2004, in its own name, Nottingham Playhouse has toured professional theatre in schools across the East Midlands. Its TIE work has also toured internationally. It now runs 65 different classes and courses for all ages and includes a programme for people at risk of homelessness, learning disabled adults, a Conversation Cafe for refugees and asylum seekers and runs thirteen youth theatres free of charge in the community.

== Awards ==
- Olivier Awards Best New Play for ‘’ Punch by James Graham
- Critics Circle Award Best New Play for Punch by James Graham 2026
- Evening Standard Award Best New Play Punch by James Graham 2026
- The Stage Awards 2025 Theatre of the Year
- UK Theatre Best Performance in a Play - David Shields, Punch 2024
- UK Theatre Most Welcoming Theatre 2023
- The Stage Regional Theatre of The Year 2019
- What's On Stage Best Revival The Madness of George III 2018
- What's on Stage Best Supporting actor Adrian Scarborough The Madness of George III 2018
- UK Theatre Best Performance in a Musical Rebecca Trehearn Sweet Charity 2019.
- UK Theatre Best Design Morgan Large, Wonderland 2018

== See also ==
- Grade II* listed buildings in Nottinghamshire
- Listed buildings in Nottingham (Radford and Park ward)
