= Ken Fleming (engineer) =

Wilfred George Kenneth Fleming
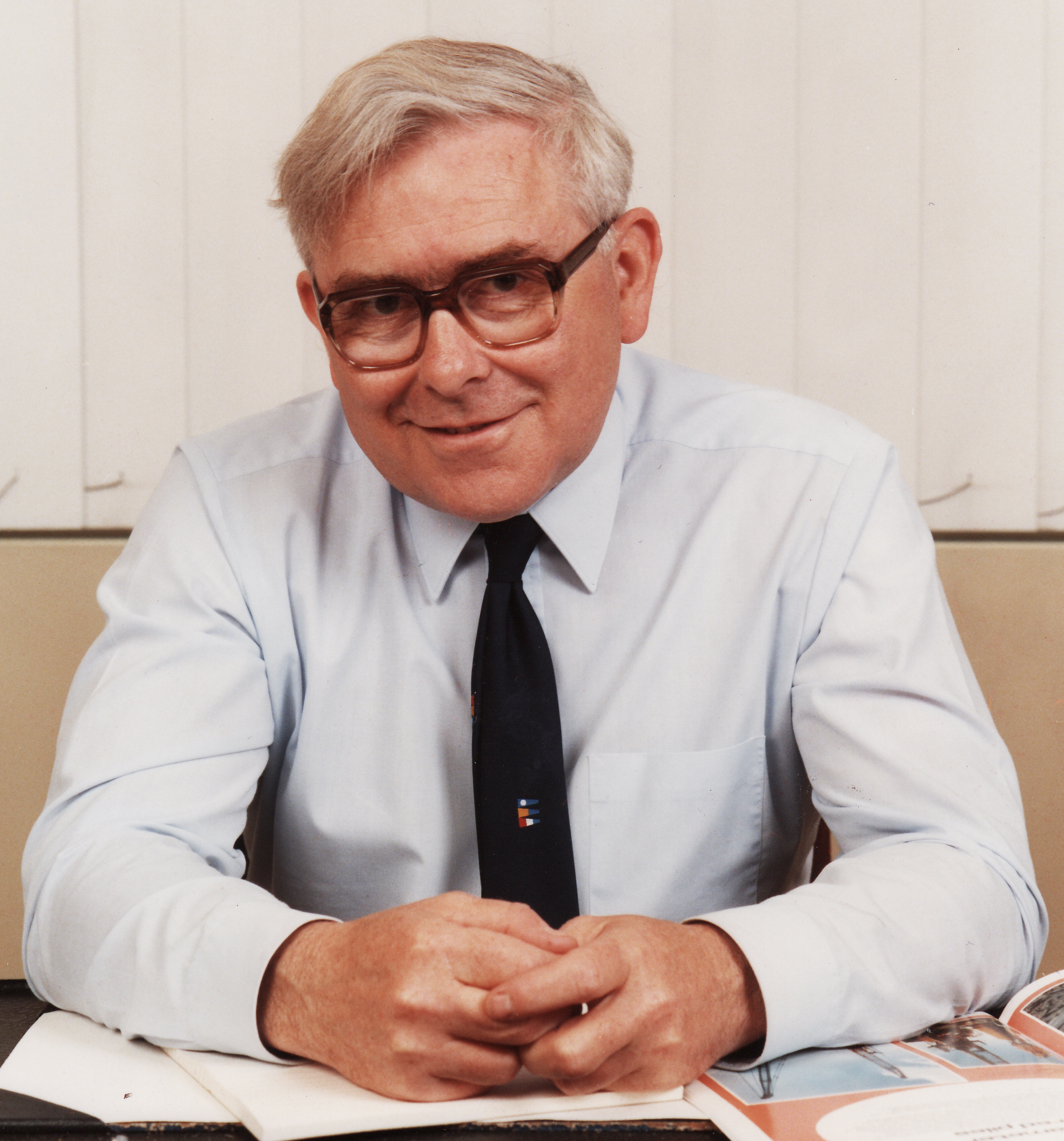
- Born: 1 February 1933; Maguiresbridge, Northern Ireland
- Died: 31 December 2001 (aged 68); Chorleywood, England
- Occupation: Civil Engineer

Wilfred George Kenneth Fleming (known as Ken) was an influential piling engineer and former chairman of the Federation of Piling Contractors.

== Early life and education ==
Born in Maguiresbridge, County Fermanagh Ken Fleming was the son of a Church of Ireland minister.

In July 1945, he won the Seale Scholarship to Portora Royal School.

He graduated from Queen's University Belfast (1955) and became an assistant lecturer, later being awarded a PhD in 1958.

== Working life ==
In 1958 Ken Fleming joined J. Laing and Sons (in Mill Hill, London, NW7). When Laing’s joined up to form McKinney Foundations, Fleming was involved as a technical advisor for the piling foundations for London's Centre Point. He also travelled to America where he spent time with company founder Jack McKinney who encouraged his interest in developing improved piling techniques.

McKinney Foundations was bought by Cementation Foundations in 1968 and Ken Fleming became chief engineer. At Cementation, Fleming was involved in the development of a series of new systems for improving the receptiveness of the ground to secure piles and to provide reliable information on the settlement of piles. Ken Fleming created the "Cemset" system which forecasts pile settlement under load.

He became chairman of the Federation of Piling Contractors, and in 1975 chairman and founder member of the Federation of Piling Specialists.

In 1985 he was the lead author of Piling Engineering, which has become an industry standard reference book. The third edition of Piling Engineering, still containing much of Fleming's original material, published in September 2008.

Fleming influenced European piling through the European Federation of Foundation Contractors. He disagreed with parts of the Eurocode EC7. Among other objections he believed it had fundamental technical flaws in relation to pile testing.

The British Standards Institution awarded Fleming its Distinguished Service award in 1992. In 1999 the British Geotechnical Society honoured him with the prestigious Skempton Medal for his lifelong contribution to geotechnical engineering.

In 2000 the British Geotechnical Association joined with Cementation (now part of Skanska) to mark Fleming's contribution to geotechnical engineering by inaugurating the Fleming Award. This international award is presented annually for excellence in geotechnical design and construction.

A visiting Professor at Queen's University Belfast, Fleming was also a prominent figure in the Institution of Civil Engineers.
