= Enniskillen Collegiate Grammar School =

Location
- 1 Cooper Crescent, BT74 6DQ; Enniskillen; Northern Ireland

Information
- Established: 1931
- Closed: 1 September 2016

Enniskillen Collegiate Grammar School was a secondary school located in Enniskillen, County Fermanagh, Northern Ireland. Informally known as the Collegiate, the school was founded under the name the Enniskillen Royal School for Girls in 1916. This name was changed when the school was taken over by the Fermanagh Regional Education Committee in 1925.

The school opened at its former east Enniskillen location in October 1931. It originally catered for eighty-eight pupils, with only four classrooms. It was the first grammar school in the province to be erected by a public body. Over the years, many extensions were made to the original building and from September 2006 to June 2007 the school celebrated seventy-five years on the site. At its closure approximately 500 pupils attended the school.

The Collegiate Grammar School merged with Portora Royal School to form the co-educational Enniskillen Royal Grammar School, as from 1 September 2016.

== Principals ==
- Doreen Ewing: 1957-1964
- Ada Malone: 1965-1976
- George Young: 1976-1997
- Kate Doherty: 1997-2004
- Elizabeth Armstrong: 2004-2016

== Musicals and Operas ==
- (2006) - Crazy for You
- (2001) - Good News
- (1999) - Me and My Girl
- (1997) - Hello, Dolly!
- (1995) - Calamity Jane
- (1993) - Class Acts!
- (1991) - Oliver!
- (1989) - Annie
- (1987) - Annie Get Your Gun
- (1985) - Half a Sixpence
- (1983) - The Boy Friend
- (1981) - The King and I
- (1979) - Fiddler on the Roof
- (1977) - My Fair Lady
- (1975) - Oliver!
- (1973) -
- (1971) - The Mikado
