= Bella Mackie =

English novelist and journalist (born 1983)

- Born: Isabella Kathleen Rusbridger; 28 July 1983 (age 43); Kentish Town, London, England
- Occupations: Author, journalist
- Spouse: Greg James (m. 2018)
- Father: Alan Rusbridger

Isabella Kathleen Rusbridger (born 28 July 1983), known professionally as Bella Mackie, is an English author, journalist, and comedy writer.

== Early life ==
Mackie is one of two daughters of Alan Rusbridger, former editor-in-chief of The Guardian, and Lindsay Mackie, whose father was the Liberal politician, George Mackie.

Mackie, grew up in Kentish Town, North London, where she continues to live. Mackie began her studies at university, but withdrew for mental health reasons. She had dealt with anxiety, agoraphobia, panic attacks, and OCD since childhood.

== Career ==
After working as a Guardian journalist, Mackie's first book was published with the title, Jog On, a non-fiction account of how running helped her to alleviate mental health problems.

Her second book How to Kill Your Family, a loose adaptation of the movie Kind Hearts and Coronets, explores funny ways for women to kill people in an attempt to subvert the attention given to men who murder women. A television adaptation of the book was commissioned by Netflix in 2024, with Anya Taylor-Joy attached to star.

== Personal life ==
Mackie met her first husband at age 28, but they divorced less than two years later. She took up running in the aftermath of her divorce. In 2018, Mackie married Greg James, a DJ on BBC Radio 1 and television presenter.

Mackie has spoken and written extensively about being child free.

== Bibliography ==
=== Nonfiction ===
- Jog On: How Running Saved My Life (2019)
- Jog On Journal: A Practical Guide to Getting Up and Running (2019)

=== Fiction ===
- How to Kill Your Family (2021)
- What a Way to Go (2024)
- Claws Out! (2026)
