= From Roger Moore with Love =

2024 documentary film about Roger Moore

- Cinema release poster
- Directed by: Jack Cocker
- Produced by: Karen Steyn
- Narrated by: Steve Coogan
- Cinematography: Jack Cocker
- Edited by: David G. Hill; Noel Nelis
- Production companies: Dartmouth Films; Whynow
- Distributed by: Dartmouth Films
- Release date: 13 December 2024
- Running time: 79 minutes
- Country: United Kingdom
- Language: English
- Box office: $8,143

From Roger Moore with Love is a 2024 British documentary film which explores the life of actor Roger Moore. The film was shot and directed by Jack Cocker. It was given a limited release on 13 December 2024.

== Reception ==
Pat Stacey of the Irish Independent wrote, "As well as film and TV series clips, the documentary has a wealth of terrific archive material: behind the scenes footage from film sets, television interviews and Moore's previously unseen home movies."

Peter Bradshaw of The Guardian gave the film four out of five stars and wrote, "This is a very enjoyable watch for Moore devotees, though the long stretch of home videos towards the end might test your patience a little bit."
