= Portora Royal School =

Coordinates: 54.351°N 7.655°W

Location
- 1 Lough Shore Road, BT74 7HA; Enniskillen; Northern Ireland

Information
- Type: Grammar school, Public School
- Motto: Omnes Honorate
- Established: 1618
- Founder: James I
- Status: Closed
- Closed: 28 June 2016
- Chairman: John McDowell
- Last principal: J.N. Morton
- Chaplain: Kenny Hall
- Enrolment: 491 (2013/14)
- Houses: Ulster, Munster, Connaught, Leinster
- Colours: Black and gold
- Nickname: Wasps
- Affiliations: HMC
- Alumni: Old Portorans
- Website: www.portoraroyal.co.uk

Portora Royal School located in Enniskillen, County Fermanagh, Northern Ireland, was one of the five "free schools" (now known as Royal Schools) founded by royal charter in 1608, by James I, making it one of the oldest schools in Ireland at the time of its closure. Originally called Enniskillen Royal School, the school was established some ten years after the Royal Decree, in 1618, 15 miles outside Enniskillen at Ballybalfour under the direction of Sir William Cole, before moving to Enniskillen in 1661. It was not until 1778 that the school moved to its final location on Portora Hill, Enniskillen, where the nucleus of the later all boys school was built. The school admitted a mixture of boarders and day pupils for much of its history, but became a day school in the 1990s.

On 28 June 2016, Portora Royal School closed. Portora Royal School amalgamated with Enniskillen Collegiate Grammar School which launched the co-educational Enniskillen Royal Grammar School on 1 September 2016, which is partially based on the original site of Portora Hill and the site of Enniskillen Collegiate Grammar School.

== Notable headmasters ==
- 1795–??:Joseph Stock (1740–1813), later Bishop of Killala and Achonry and afterwards Bishop of Waterford and Lismore.
- 1798–1819: Robert Burrowes
- 1935–1945: I. M. B. Stuart, Ireland rugby footballer.

== Notable alumni ==
- Desmond Arthur, early 20th century pilot
- Robert Baloucoune, Rugby Union player for Ireland and Ulster
- Samuel Beckett, winner of Nobel Prize in Literature and the only winner of the Nobel Prize to have played first-class cricket
- James David Bourchier, journalist and Bulgarian confidant
- Denis Parsons Burkitt, surgeon
- Sir Andrew Clarke, governor of the Straits Settlements
- Edward Cooney, evangelist and Cooneyite founder
- Lord Nigel Dodds, politician, member of the UK House of Lords
- Charles Duff, writer and polyglot
- Cyril Falls, World War 1 military historian
- Ken Fleming, civil engineer and foundations specialist
- James Gamble, founder of Procter & Gamble.
- Neil Hannon, singer and songwriter, founder of pop band The Divine Comedy
- William Hearn, legal academic
- George Hegarty, World War 1 flying ace.
- Michael Jackson, Church of Ireland Lord Archbishop of Dublin (and formerly Lord Bishop of Clogher)
- Sir Jim Kilfedder, former Unionist MP
- Graham Little, Northern Ireland journalist
- Dickie Lloyd, cricketer and rugby union player
- Henry Francis Lyte, Anglican minister and hymn writer
- Billy McComb, magician
- J. J. McCoy (rugby union), Ireland international rugby player
- Leo McKinstry, journalist and author
- James Cecil Parke, Irish rugby union player, Wimbledon and Australian Open champion
- Frederick Maurice Watson Harvey, Irish rugby union player, Victoria Cross winner
- Donald Burgess McNeill, physics academic, transport author, rower, and first Esquire Bedale of Southampton University
- Sir Roy McNulty, businessman
- Vivian Mercier, literary critic
- E. Charles Nelson, botanist
- Sir Edward Sullivan, 1st Baronet, Lord Chancellor of Ireland
- John Sullivan - Jesuit priest.
- Sir Charles Tegart, commissioner of the Indian Police and Palestine fort builder
- Emily Valentine - 1st known woman to play rugby
- Brian Goold-Verschoyle - British Communist, Spanish Civil War veteran, died a victim of Stalin's Great Purge in a Soviet gulag
- Leslie Waddington, art dealer
- Peter Webb, cricketer and business executive
- Harry West, politician (Ulster Unionist Party leader and Stormont Minister)
- Oscar Wilde, playwright
- H.M. French, artist and latinist

== Oscar Wilde ==
Former pupil Oscar Wilde won a scholarship to Trinity College Dublin, and his name appears on the school's Honours board. There is also an Ulster History Circle Blue Plaque on the school building commemorating him.

Wilde's name was painted over in 1895 following his imprisonment for homosexuality, which was criminalised in the United Kingdom. Additionally, initials he had carved into the window casement of a classroom as a student there were removed. His name was later reinstated on the Honours board.

== Formation of Enniskillen Royal Grammar School ==
A proposal by the Department of Education to merge Portora Royal School with the Enniskillen Collegiate Grammar School to form Enniskillen Royal Grammar School was approved by the Minister of Education, John O'Dowd, in June 2015 but the matter was taken to the High Court in October 2015 due to much local opposition. The High Court bid to stop the amalgamation of the two Enniskillen grammar schools failed.

== See also ==
- Portora Castle
