= 2025–26 Leinster Rugby season =

Leinster Rugby
- 2025–26 season
- Head coach: Leo Cullen
- Chief executive: Shane Nolan
- United Rugby Championship: Champions
- Champions Cup: Runner-up
- URC Irish Shield: Champions (5th title)
- IRFU Women's Interpros: Runner-up
- Women's Celtic Challenge: Champions (3rd title) as Wolfhounds
- Top try scorer: League: Joshua Kenny – (9); All: Joshua Kenny – (11)
- Top points scorer: League: Sam Prendergast – (75); All: Harry Byrne – (131)
- Highest home attendance: 51,859 (vs Munster, URC Rd 4)
- Lowest home attendance: 9,463 (vs Lions , Quarter-final)
- Average home attendance: 23,274

The 2025–26 season was Leinster Rugby's fifth season in the United Rugby Championship (URC), their 32nd season of professional rugby and their 138th season of representative rugby since their foundation. Along with competing in the URC and its Irish Shield competition, both of which it entered aschampion, the club also participated in the 2025–26 European Rugby Champions Cup. Leinster opened the URC season with an away tie at Stormers on 26 September 2025.

Leinster emerged once again as United Rugby Championship champions, defeating Pretoria Bulls 36-7 in Dublin in the Grand final, in a repeat of the previous years final. They retained the URC Irish Shield for a fifth time, but were runners-up for a record fifth time in the European Rugby Champions Cup, losing to Bordeaux-Begles in Bilbao.

Leinster Women will contest the 2025 IRFU Women's Interprovincial Series as defending champions, opening their season on 10 August 2025 against Ulster Women. They lost the final to Munster Rugby Women. They also fielded the combined Wolfhounds team, with Ulster Rugby in the 2025–26 Celtic Challenge, once more as defending champions, and retained the title.

== Leinster Men ==
=== Players in ===
- (Ireland) Fintan Gunne (promoted from Academy)
- (Ireland) Gus McCarthy (promoted from Academy)
- (Ireland) Andrew Osborne (promoted from Academy)
- (Ireland) Diarmuid Mangan (promoted from Academy)
- (Ireland) Niall Smyth (promoted from Academy)
- (Ireland) Hugh Cooney (promoted from Academy)
- (Ireland) Alex Usanov (promoted from Academy)
- (Ireland) Charlie Tector (promoted from Academy)
- (New Zealand) Rieko Ioane from (New Zealand) Blues (short-term deal)
- (Ireland) Ed Byrne from (Wales) Cardiff (short-term loan)

=== Players out ===
- (New Zealand) Jordie Barrett to (New Zealand) Hurricanes
- (Ireland) Lee Barron to (Ireland) Munster
- (Ireland) Michael Milne to (Ireland) Munster
- (Ireland) Ross Byrne to (England) Gloucester
- (Ireland) Cian Healy (retired)
- (Ireland) Ben Brownlee to (New Zealand) North Harbour
- (Ireland) Liam Turner to (France) Nevers
- (Ireland) Rob Russell to (England) Gloucester
- (Ireland) Rory McGuire to (Ireland) Ulster
- (Ireland) Aitzol King to (Ireland) Ulster

=== Preseason ===
Leinster's pre-season campaign consisted of a single match, hosting Cardiff at the South Dublin Tallaght Stadium.

| 13 September 2025 | (Ireland) Leinster | 10–31 | Cardiff (Wales) | Tallaght Stadium |
| 18:00 | | Report |

=== United Rugby Championship ===
==== Matches ====
The full itinerary of matches was released on 21 May 2025.

| 26 September 2025 | (1 BP) Stormers (South Africa) | 35–0 | (Ireland) Leinster | Cape Town Stadium |
| 18:00 | Try: Ungerer 45'; Roos (2) 63', 68'; Matthee 71'; Con: Matthee (3) 45', 64', 69'; Pen: Matthee (3) 7', 33', 42' | Report | Cards: Deegan (yellow card) 63'; T. O'Brien (yellow card) 67' | Attendance: 13,529; Referee: Gianluca Gnecchi |

| 4 October 2025 | (1 BP) Bulls (South Africa) | 39–31 | (Ireland) Leinster (1 BP) | Loftus Versfeld Stadium, Pretoria |
| 17:30 | Try: De Klerk 4' c Kriel (2) 16' m, 78' c Gumede 41' c Le Roux 58' m Jacobs 68' m Con: Johannes (2) 5', 42'; Kriel 79'; Pen: Johannes 35' | Report | Try: Clarkson 30' c Cooney 44' c T. O'Brien 46' c Penny 66' c Con: Prendergast (4) 31', 45', 47', 66'; Pen: Prendergast 20'; Cards: Connors (yellow card) 21' | Attendance: 6,937; Referee: Adam Jones |

| 11 October 2025 | (1 BP) Leinster (Ireland) | 31–5 | (South Africa) Sharks | Aviva Stadium, Dublin |
| 17:30 | Try: Jamie Osborne 12' c Jimmy O'Brien 23' c Van der Flier 27' c Deegan 49' m Gus McCarthy 71' m Con: Harry Byrne (3) 13', 23', 28'; Cards: Boyle (yellow card) 74' | Report | Try: Hooker 30' m | Attendance: 17, 549 |

| 18 October 2025 | Leinster | 14–31 | Munster (1 BP) | Croke Park, Dublin |
| 17:15 | Try: Kelleher 7' c Penny 79' c Con: Prendergast (2) 8', 80+1'; Cards: Frawley (yellow card) 77' | Report | Try: Gleeson 17' c Tom Farrell 23' c Coughlan 37' c Penalty try 76'; Con: Crowley (3) 18', 24', 38'; Pen: Crowley 49'; Cards: Coombes (yellow card) 79' | Attendance: 51,859; Referee: Gianluca Gnecchi (Italy) |

| 25 October 2025 | (1 BP) Leinster (Ireland) | 50–26 | (Italy) Zebre Parma (1 BP) | Aviva Stadium, Dublin |
| 17:30 | Try: Kenny (2) 2' c, 27' c Soroka (2) 7' m, 12' c Cahir 48' c Byrne 55' m Snyman 68' c Connors 78' m Con: Byrne (5) 2', 13', 27', 49', 69'; Cards: A. Osborne (red card) 30' | Report; Scoreboard; Highlights | Try: Belloni 10' c Dominguez 20' c Quattrini 32' c Marco Zanon 73' m Con: da Re (3) 11', 21', 33'; Cards: Dominguez (red card) 37' | Attendance: 14,128; Referee: Ian Kenny (Scotland) |

| 28 November 2025 | Dragons (Wales) | 10–24 | (Ireland) Leinster (1 BP) | Rodney Parade, Newport |
| 19:45 | Try: Screech 31' c Con: De Beer 32'; Pen: O'Brien 47' | Report | Try: Soroka 4' m Kenny (2) 44' c, 59' m Snyman 78' c Con: Byrne (2) 45', 79'; Cards: Mangan (yellow card) 29'; Penny (yellow card) 38'; McGrath (yellow card) 80' | Attendance: 4,244; Referee: Morne Ferreira (South Africa) |

| 19 December 2025 | (1 BP) Leinster (Ireland) | 24–20 | (Ireland) Ulster (1 BP) | Aviva Stadium, Dublin |
| 19:45 | Try: Ioane 27' c Kenny 54' m Lowe 66' m Sheehan 74' c Con: Prendergast 27'; Byrne 75'; Cards: Ryan (yellow card) 59' | Report | Try: Kok (2) 14' m, 34' c Stewart 38' m Con: Doak 35'; Pen: Doak 62'; Cards: McCann (yellow card) 72' | Attendance: 22,011; Referee: Andrew Brace (Ireland) |

| 27 December 2025 | (1 BP) Munster (Ireland) | 8–13 | (Ireland) Leinster | Thomond Park, Limerick |
| 19:45 | Try: Kelly 70' m Pen: Crowley 55' | Report | Try: Van der Flier 6' c Con: Byrne 7'; Pen: Byrne (2) 53', 59' | Attendance: 26,000; Referee: Peter Martin (Ireland) |

| 3 January 2026 | (1 BP) Leinster (Ireland) | 52–17 | (Ireland) Connacht | Aviva Stadium, Dublin |
| 17:30 | Try: Sheehan 4' c Tector (2) 8' c, 62' c Prendergast 39' m Deeny 44' c O'Brien (2) 52' c, 67' c Kenny 75'; Con: Prendergast (6/8) 5', 8', 45', 52', 63', 67'; Cards: Joe McCarthy (yellow card) 26' | Report | Try: Tierney-Martin 19' c Bealham 36' c Con: Gilbert (2/2) 20', 37'; Pen: Gilbert 28' | Attendance: 21,422; Referee: Andrew Brace (Ireland) |

| 24 January 2026 | Connacht (Ireland) | 23–34 | (Ireland) Leinster (1 BP) | The Sportsground, Galway |
| 17:30 | Try: Tierney-Martin 12' c West 48' c Con: Gilbert (2/2) 13', 49'; Pen: Gilbert (3) 23', 33', 67' | Report | Try: Gunne 8' c RG Snyman 57' c Tector 60' c Frawley 70' c Con: Byrne (4/4) 9', 58', 61', 71'; Pen: Byrne (2) 27', 31' | Attendance: 12,481; Referee: Eoghan Cross (Ireland) |

| 31 January 2026 | (1 BP) Leinster (Ireland) | 28–20 | (Scotland) Edinburgh | Aviva Stadium, Dublin |
| 17:30 | Try: Deegan 13' c Penny (3) 44' c, 68' c, 74' c Con: Tector (4/4) 14', 45', 69', 75' | Report | Try: Van der Merwe 20' m Satala 39' c Shiel 80+1' m Con: Thompson 40'; Pen: Thompson 23'; Cards: Hunter-Hill (yellow card) 10' | Attendance: 18,505 |

| 27 February 2026 | Cardiff (Wales) | 8–7 | (Ireland) Leinster (1 BP) | Cardiff Arms Park |
| 19:45 | Try: Davies 54' m Pen: Sheedy 19'; Cards: Beetham (yellow card) 66' | | Try: McGrath 68'c Con: Tector 68'; Cards: Tector (yellow card) 12' | Referee: Sam Grove-White (Scotland) |

| 21 March 2026 | (1 BP) Glasgow Warriors (Scotland) | 38–17 | (Ireland) Leinster | Scotstoun Stadium, Glasgow |
| 17:30 | Try: Duncan 27' c Hiddleston 31' m Horne (2) 34' c, 78' m Rowe 37' c Smith 69' c Con: Horne (4/6) 28', 35', 38', 70'; Cards: Hastings (yellow card) 78' | | Try: Kenny 17' m Keenan 41' c Frawley 73' m Con: Prendergast (1/3) 42'; Cards: Deeny (yellow card) 26'; Kelleher (yellow card) 29'; Slimani (yellow card) 79' | Attendance: 7,321 |

| 27 March 2026 | (1 BP) Leinster (Ireland) | 36–19 | (Wales) Scarlets | Aviva Stadium, Dublin |
| 19:45 | Try: Ringrose 29' c Kenny (2) 34' m, 75' c O'Brien (2) 43' m, 46' m Deegan 67' c Con: Byrne (3/6) 30', 67', 76'; Cards: Deeny (yellow card) 17' | Report | Try: Roberts 17'; Rogers 57'; Douglas 72'; Con: Hawkins (2/3) 18', 73'; Cards: Roberts (yellow card) 23'; Taylor (yellow card) 28' | Attendance: 15,301; Referee: Quinton Immelman (South Africa) |

| 17 April 2026 | Ulster (Ireland) | 21–29 | (Ireland) Leinster (1 BP) | Ravenhill Stadium, Belfast |
| 19:45 | Try: Bryn Ward 55' c Zac Ward (2) 62' , 65' c Con: Doak (3/3) 56', 63', 66'; Cards: Sheridan (yellow card) 46' | Report | Try: Culhane 17' c J O'Brien 38' m Henshaw 45' c Prendergast 51' c Con: Prendergast (3/4) 17', 46', 52'; Pen: Prendergast 24'; Cards: Deegan (red card) 61' | Attendance: 18,196; Referee: Andrew Brace (Ireland) |

| 25 April 2026 | (1 BP) Benetton (Italy) | 29–26 | (Ireland) Leinster (2 BP) | Stadio Comunale di Monigo, Treviso |
| 19:45 | Try: Garbisi 9' m Mendy 47' c Gasperini (2) 61' c, 71' c Con: Umaga (3/4) 48', 62', 72'; Pen: Umaga 80+3' | Report | Try: O'Tighearnaigh 14' c Van der Flier 36' c Gibson-Park 43' m Frawley 66' c Con: Byrne (2/3) 15', 37'; Prendergast (1/1) 67' | Attendance: 6,327; Referee: Ferreira (South Africa) |

| 9 May 2026 | (1 BP) Leinster (Ireland) | 31–7 | (South Africa) Lions | Aviva Stadium, Dublin |
| 17:30 | Try: J Osborne 2' c Clarkson 24' c Keenan 70' c Ioane 74' m J O'Brien 80' m Con: Prendergast (2/2) 3', 24'; Frawley (1/3) 71' | Report | Try: F. Horn 35' c Con: C. W. Smith 36' | Attendance: 16,259; Referee: Hollie Davidson (Scotland) |

| 16 May 2026 | (1 BP) Leinster (Ireland) | 68–14 | (Wales) Ospreys | Aviva Stadium, Dublin |
| 17:15 | Try: J McCarthy (3) 4' c, 55' m, 62' c Deegan 7' c Van der Flier 20' c J O'Brien 23' c Ringrose 44' c Larmour (2) 53'c, 58' c Lowe 64'c Con: Byrne (4/4) 4', 7', 21', 24'; Frawley (5/6) 45', 53', 58', 63', 65' | Report | Try: Owen-Sutton 31' c D. Edwards 78' c Con: D. Edwards (2/2) 32', 79' | Attendance: 15,104; Referee: Ru Campbell (Scotland) |

==== Table ====
| Pos | Team | Pld | W | D | L | PF | PA | PD | TF | TA | TB | LB | Pts | Qualification |
|---|---|---|---|---|---|---|---|---|---|---|---|---|---|---|
| 1 | Glasgow Warriors | 18 | 13 | 0 | 5 | 479 | 338 | +141 | 72 | 48 | 11 | 2 | 65 | Qualification for the Champions Cup and knockout stage |
| 2 | Leinster (CH) | 18 | 12 | 0 | 6 | 515 | 370 | +145 | 77 | 51 | 13 | 2 | 63 | Qualification for the Champions Cup and knockout stage |
| 3 | Stormers | 18 | 12 | 1 | 5 | 504 | 344 | +160 | 63 | 48 | 9 | 1 | 60 | Qualification for the Champions Cup and knockout stage |
| 4 | Bulls (RU) | 18 | 12 | 0 | 6 | 576 | 406 | +170 | 82 | 59 | 10 | 1 | 59 | Qualification for the Champions Cup and knockout stage |
| 5 | Munster | 18 | 11 | 0 | 7 | 396 | 376 | +20 | 59 | 51 | 8 | 3 | 55 | Qualification for the Champions Cup and knockout stage |
| 6 | Cardiff | 18 | 11 | 0 | 7 | 353 | 372 | −19 | 52 | 52 | 7 | 4 | 55 | Qualification for the Champions Cup and knockout stage |
| 7 | Lions | 18 | 10 | 1 | 7 | 532 | 473 | +59 | 73 | 70 | 9 | 3 | 54 | Qualification for the Champions Cup and knockout stage |
| 8 | Connacht | 18 | 10 | 0 | 8 | 442 | 395 | +47 | 62 | 56 | 10 | 4 | 54 | Qualification for the Champions Cup and knockout stage |
| 9 | Ulster | 18 | 9 | 1 | 8 | 494 | 420 | +74 | 72 | 60 | 10 | 4 | 52 | Qualification for the Challenge Cup |
| 10 | Sharks | 18 | 8 | 1 | 9 | 467 | 428 | +39 | 71 | 57 | 9 | 3 | 46 | Qualification for the Challenge Cup |
| 11 | Ospreys | 18 | 7 | 2 | 9 | 376 | 454 | −78 | 55 | 69 | 4 | 3 | 39 | Qualification for the Challenge Cup |
| 12 | Edinburgh | 18 | 7 | 0 | 11 | 362 | 439 | −77 | 57 | 66 | 6 | 4 | 38 | Qualification for the Challenge Cup |
| 13 | Benetton | 18 | 6 | 2 | 10 | 327 | 493 | −166 | 41 | 71 | 4 | 1 | 33 | Qualification for the Challenge Cup |
| 14 | Scarlets | 18 | 4 | 2 | 12 | 361 | 460 | −99 | 52 | 63 | 3 | 5 | 28 | Qualification for the Challenge Cup |
| 15 | Dragons | 18 | 3 | 4 | 11 | 350 | 481 | −131 | 46 | 71 | 4 | 4 | 28 | Qualification for the Challenge Cup |
| 16 | Zebre | 18 | 2 | 0 | 16 | 312 | 587 | −275 | 43 | 85 | 3 | 4 | 15 | Qualification for the Challenge Cup |

Updated to match(es) played on 16 May 2026. Source: UnitedRugby.com
Rules for classification: Tiebreakers for teams tied on points: 1) Number of matches won 2) The difference between points for and points against 3) The number of tries scored 4) The most points scored 5) The difference between tries for and tries against 6) The fewest red cards received 7) The fewest yellow cards received.

==== Playoffs ====
The top eight teams in the regular season standings advance to the knockout stage, a single-elimination tournament culminating in a Grand Final to crown the overall champion.

Teams are seeded based on the regular season standings, with teams ranked 1–4 receiving home field advantage in the quarter-final, with 1 playing 8, 2 playing 7 etc. The top two teams in the standings are seeded so as not to meet until the Grand Final.

Home-field advantage for the semi-finals and Grand Final will be awarded to the highest-ranked team in each tie; the top two teams are therefore guaranteed home advantage until the final for as long as they remain in the tournament, and the top ranked team, Glasgow Warriors, in the standings will be awarded home advantage should they reach the Grand Final. In the build up to the final week of the regular season, it was reported that Glasgow Warriors may be forced to play a semi-final and final outside Scotland due to venue unavailability, although they would technically remain the home team. In the week of the quarter-final, it was announced they would, if they progressed, play their semi-final and Grand Final on home soil, at Murrayfield Stadium, Edinburgh.

Cardiff and Lions both made the play-offs for the first time. Stormers, Glasgow Warriors, Leinster, Munster and Bulls reached their fifth URC play-off phase from five seasons. Glasgow Warriors became the first non-Irish team to top the regular season table and take the number one seeding since they did so themselves in 2019.

Quarter-finals
1 | (Scotland) Glasgow Warriors | 33
8 | (Ireland) Connacht | 21
4 | (South Africa) Bulls | 45
5 | (Ireland) Munster | 14
3 | (South Africa) Stormers | 44
6 | (Wales) Cardiff | 21
2 | (Ireland) Leinster | 59
7 | (South Africa) Lions | 10

Semi-finals
1 | (Scotland) Glasgow Warriors | 21
4 | (South Africa) Bulls | 22
2 | (Ireland) Leinster | 20
3 | (South Africa) Stormers | 11

Final
2 | (Ireland) Leinster | 36
4 | (South Africa) Bulls | 7

Quarter-final

| 30 May 2026 | Leinster (Ireland) (2) | 59–10 | (7) (South Africa) Lions | Aviva Stadium, Dublin |
| 19:45 | Try: Sheehan 10' c Keenan 15' c Ryan 40' c Penny 43' m Prendergast 46' c G. McCarthy 55' c O'Brien 64' c Lowe (2) 68' c, 80+1' m Con: Prendergast (7/9) 11', 16', 40+1', 47', 56', 65', 69'; Cards: Clarkson (yellow card) 35' | Report | Try: Van Wyk (2) 36' m, 58' m Cards: Horn (yellow card) 54' | Attendance: 9,493; Referee: Sam Grove-White (Scotland) |

Semi-final

| 6 June 2026 | Leinster (Ireland) (2) | 20 – 11 | (3) (South Africa) Stormers | Aviva Stadium, Dublin |
| 17:30 | Try: Ioane 8' c Gibson-Park 70' c Con: Prendergast 9'; Byrne 71'; Pen: Prendergast (2) 18', 24' | Report | Try: A. Smith 28' m Pen: Matthee (2) 35', 53'; Cards: Ackermann (red card) 69'; Zas (yellow card) 47'; Moerat (yellow card) 70' | Attendance: 15,346; Referee: Hollie Davidson (Scotland) |

==== URC Grand Final ====
| 19 June 2026 | Leinster (Ireland) (2) | 36 – 7 | (4) (South Africa) Bulls | Croke Park, Dublin |
| 19:30 | Try: T O'Brien 6' c Ioane 16' m Conan 27' c Prendergast 46' c Byrne 76' c Con: Prendergast (3/4) 6', 27', 46'; Byrne 77'; Pen: Prendergast 32'; Cards: Lowe (yellow card) 58' | Report | Try: Moodie 62' c Con: Pollard 63'; Cards: Moodie (yellow card) 2' le Roux (yellow card) 25' | Attendance: 39,184; Referee: Andrea Piardi (Italy) |

==== URC Irish Shield ====
2025–26 United Rugby Championship Regional Shield tables
(Ireland) Irish Shield
| | Team | P | W | D | L | PF | PA | PD | TF | TA | TBP | LBP | Pts | Pos overall |
| 1 | (Ireland) Leinster | 6 | 5 | 0 | 1 | 166 | 120 | +46 | 23 | 15 | 4 | 0 | 24 | 2 |
| 2 | (Ireland) Munster | 6 | 3 | 0 | 3 | 126 | 91 | +35 | 16 | 15 | 2 | 1 | 15 | 5 |
| 3 | (Ireland) Connacht | 6 | 2 | 0 | 4 | 131 | 157 | –27 | 18 | 21 | 2 | 2 | 12 | 8 |
| 4 | (Ireland) Ulster | 6 | 2 | 0 | 4 | 131 | 147 | –16 | 18 | 22 | 1 | 2 | 11 | 9 |
If teams are level at any stage, tiebreakers are applied in the following order: 1. number of matches won 2. the difference between points for and points against 3. the number of tries scored 4. the most points scored 5. the difference between tries for and tries against 6. the fewest red cards received 7. the fewest yellow cards received
Green background indicates teams currently leading the regional shield. Upon the conclusion of the regular season, these teams win their respective regional shields. (S) : URC Shield champion

=== European Rugby Champions Cup ===
Leinster were drawn in Pool 3 of the European Rugby Champions Cup alongside fellow URC side Stormers (whom Leinster did not play in line with the competition's rules), Harlequins, Leicester Tigers, Bayonne and erstwhile rivals La Rochelle. The full fixture details were released on 15 July 2025.

==== Pool stage ====
| 6 December 2025 | (1 BP) Leinster (Ireland) | 45–28 | (England) Harlequins (1 BP) | Aviva Stadium, Dublin |
| 17:30 | Try: Larmour (2) 5' m, 25' m Ringrose 17' c Frawley 40' c T O'Brien 61' c Conan 65' c J O'Brien 68' c Con: Prendergast (2/4) 17', 40'; Byrne (3/3) 62', 66', 69'; Cards: J O'Brien (yellow card) 59' | Report | Try: Northmore 12' c Cleaves 34' c Penalty try 51'; Beard 78' c Con: Evans (2/2) 13', 35'; Benson (1/1) 79'; Cards: Evans (yellow card) 58' | Attendance: 22,298; Referee: Craig Evans (Wales) |

| 12 December 2025 | Leicester Tigers (England) | 15–23 | (Ireland) Leinster | Mattioli Woods Welford Road, Leicester |
| 20:00 | Try: Radwan 21' c Hassell-Collins 40' m Con: Searle (1) 22'; Pen: Searle (20') | Report | Try: Gibson-Park 50' c Sheehan 72' c Con: Byrne 51'; Prendergast 73'; Pen: Byrne (3) 15', 32', 61' | Attendance: 18,061; Referee: Pierre Brousset (France) |

| 10 January 2026 | (1 BP) Leinster (Ireland) | 25–24 | (France) La Rochelle (1 BP) | Aviva Stadium, Dublin |
| 17:30 | Try: Kenny (2) 2’ m, 8’ c Van der Flier 66’ m Henshaw 69’ m Con: Prendergast (1/3) 9'; Pen: Byrne (1/1) 80+1'; Cards: O'Brien (yellow card) 12'; J McCarthy (yellow card) 36' | Report | Try: Niniashvili 28’ c West (2) 58' c, 76' c Con: Le Garrec (3/3) 29', 59', 77'; Pen: Le Garrec (1/1) 54' | Attendance: 38,044; Referee: Matthew Carley (England) |

| 17 January 2026 | Bayonne (France) | 13–22 | (Ireland) Leinster | Stade Jean-Dauger, Bayonne |
| 16:15 | Try: Maqala 14' c Con: Segonds (1/1) 15'; Pen: Segonds (2/3) 23', 59'; Cards: Jantjies (yellow card) 49' | Report | Try: Sheehan 55' c Prendergast 73' c Deegan 79' m Con: Byrne (2/3) 56', 74'; Pen: Byrne (1/1) 20' | Attendance: 14,627; Referee: Luke Pearce (England) |

European Rugby Champions Cup Pool 3
| Pos | Team | Pld | W | D | L | PF | PA | PD | TF | TA | TB | LB | Pts | Qualification |
|---|---|---|---|---|---|---|---|---|---|---|---|---|---|---|
| 1 | (Ireland) Leinster (3) | 4 | 4 | 0 | 0 | 115 | 80 | +35 | 16 | 10 | 2 | 0 | 18 | Home Champions Cup round of 16 |
| 2 | (England) Harlequins (6) | 4 | 3 | 0 | 1 | 184 | 86 | +98 | 26 | 14 | 3 | 0 | 15 | Home Champions Cup round of 16 |
| 3 | (South Africa) Stormers (9) | 4 | 3 | 0 | 1 | 117 | 125 | −8 | 15 | 19 | 2 | 0 | 14 | Away Champions Cup round of 16 |
| 4 | (England) Leicester Tigers (16) | 4 | 1 | 0 | 3 | 118 | 115 | +3 | 17 | 15 | 2 | 0 | 6 | Away Champions Cup round of 16 |
| 5 | (France) La Rochelle (11CC) | 4 | 1 | 0 | 3 | 101 | 114 | −13 | 15 | 15 | 1 | 1 | 6 | Away Challenge Cup round of 16 |
| 6 | (France) Bayonne | 4 | 0 | 0 | 4 | 58 | 173 | −115 | 8 | 24 | 0 | 0 | 0 | |

Source: EPCR
Rules for classification: Tiebreakers for teams tied on points: 1) Number of matches won; 2) Difference between points for and against; 3) Total number of points for; 4) Aggregate number of points scored in matches between tied teams; 5) Number of matches won excluding the first match, then the second and so on until the tie is settled.

==== Knockout stage ====
Leinster qualified for the round of sixteen when they confirmed a top four finish in Pool 3 in Round 3. They confirmed a top four seeding, a home tie in the round of 16, and a potential home quarter-final, with victory over Bayonne in Round 4 of Pool 3. In the round of 16, Leinster will host Edinburgh as third seeds overall.

Round of 16
1 | (France) Bordeaux Bègles | 64
16 | (England) Leicester Tigers | 14
8 | (France) Toulouse | 59
9 | (England) Bristol Bears | 26
4 | (England) Bath | 31
13 | (England) Saracens | 22
5 | (England) Northampton Saints | 49
12 | (France) Castres | 41
2 | (Scotland) Glasgow Warriors | 25
15 | (South Africa) Bulls | 21
7 | (France) Toulon | 28
10 | (South Africa) Stormers | 27
3 | (Ireland) Leinster | 49
14 | (Scotland) Edinburgh | 31
6 | (England) Harlequins | 17
11 | (England) Sale Sharks | 26

Quarter-finals
1 | (France) Bordeaux Bègles | 30
8 | (France) Toulouse | 15
4 | (England) Bath | 43
5 | (England) Northampton Saints | 41
2 | (Scotland) Glasgow Warriors | 19
7 | (France) Toulon | 22
3 | (Ireland) Leinster | 43
11 | (England) Sale Sharks | 13

Semi-finals
1 | (France) Bordeaux Bègles | 38
4 | (England) Bath | 26
3 | (Ireland) Leinster | 29
7 | (France) Toulon | 25

Final
1 | (France) Bordeaux Bègles | 41
3 | (Ireland) Leinster | 19

Round of 16

| 5 April 2026 | Leinster (Ireland) (3) | 49–31 | (14) (Scotland) Edinburgh | Aviva Stadium, Dublin |
| 17:30 | Try: T. O'Brien (2) 1' c, 8' c J. O'Brien 24' c Keenan 36' c Van der Flier 55' c Clarkson 62' c Ioane 64' c Con: Byrne (7/7) 2', 9', 25', 37', 56', 63', 65' | Report | Try: Shiel 15' m Thompson (2) 19' c, 27' c Currie 39' c Graham 51' m Con: Thompson (3/5) 20', 27', 40' | Attendance: 21,491; Referee: Luke Pearce (England) |

Quarter-final

| 11 April 2026 | Leinster (Ireland) (3) | 43–13 | (11) (England) Sale Sharks | Aviva Stadium, Dublin |
| 17:30 | Try: Sheehan 9' c Keenan 43' m Baird 53' c Ioane 56' c T. O'Brien 62' c Osborne 80' c Con: Byrne (5/6) 10', 54', 57', 63', 80'; Pen: Byrne (1/1) 74' | Report | Try: Wills 68' c Con: Ford (1/1) 69'; Pen: Ford (2/2) 34', 46'; Cards: D. du Preez (yellow card) 36'; McIntyre (yellow card) 43' | Attendance: 18,839; Referee: Pierre Brousset (France) |

Semi-final

| 2 May 2026 | Leinster (Ireland) (3) | 29–25 | (7) (France) Toulon | Aviva Stadium, Dublin |
| 15:00 | Try: Conan 12’ Van der Flier 32’ Ringrose 43’ Doris 66’ Con: Byrne (3/3) 13', 32', 67'; Pen: Byrne (1/3) 48'; Cards: Porter (yellow card) 35'; Byrne (yellow card) 36' | Report | Try: Tuicuvu 36'; Serin 69'; Drean 75'; Con: Jaminet (2/3) 70', 76'; Pen: Jaminet (2) 15', 25'; Cards: Baubigny (yellow card) 43' | Attendance: 38,555; Referee: Luke Pearce (England) |

Final

| 23 May 2026 | Bordeaux Bègles (France) (1) | 41–19 | (3) (Ireland) Leinster | San Mamés Stadium, Bilbao |
| 15:45 CEST (UTC+02) | Try: Lucu 13' c Uberti 17' c Bielle-Biarrey (2) 24' c, 35' c Moefana 41' c Con: Lucu (5/5) 14', 18', 25', 36', 42'; Pen: Lucu (2/2) 59', 64' | Report | Try: O'Brien 8' c J. McCarthy 45' m Ringrose 71' c Con: Byrne (1/1) 9'; Frawley (1/2) 71' | Attendance: 52,327; Referee: Karl Dickson (England) |

== Leinster Women ==
=== IRFU Women's Interprovincial Series ===
The 2025 IRFU Women's Interprovincial Series is being contested by women's teams representing the four provincial rugby unions of Ireland, under the same branding and uniforms as the senior men's teams in the United Rugby Championship. The competition uses a single round-robin format, similar to the one used in both the Six Nations Championship and the Women's Six Nations Championship. Each team plays the other three teams once.

As in previous seasons the competition also features playoffs and a final.

Leinster Women returned as defending champions, but lost in the final to Munster Women.

==== Table ====
| Pos | Team | Pld | W | D | L | PF | PA | PD | TF | TA | TB | LB | Pts | Qualification or relegation |
|---|---|---|---|---|---|---|---|---|---|---|---|---|---|---|
| 1 | Munster Women (CH) | 3 | 3 | 0 | 0 | 115 | 44 | +71 | 18 | 5 | 3 | 0 | 15 | Qualified for Interprovincial final |
| 2 | Leinster Women (RU) | 3 | 2 | 0 | 1 | 76 | 66 | +10 | 14 | 10 | 2 | 0 | 10 | Qualified for Interprovincial final |
| 3 | Connacht Women | 3 | 1 | 0 | 2 | 27 | 66 | −39 | 5 | 12 | 0 | 1 | 5 | Qualified for third/fourth place final |
| 4 | Ulster Women | 3 | 0 | 0 | 3 | 43 | 87 | −44 | 7 | 15 | 0 | 1 | 1 | Qualified for third/fourth place final |

First match(es) will be played: Unknown. Source: Unknown
Rules for classification: 1) competition points; 2) match points difference; 3) match points for

==== Matches ====
| 10 August 2025 | (1 BP) Leinster Women (Ireland) | 37–21 | (Ireland) Ulster Women | Energia Park |
| 14:30 | Try: Baker (2); Brogan (3); Neill; Gaffney; Con: Caughey (1/7) | Report | Try: Sheerin; Daley; Barrett; Con: Sheerin (3/3) | Referee: Cian Aherne (Ireland) |

| 16 August 2025 | (1 BP) Leinster Women (Ireland) | 22–33 | (Ireland) Munster Women (1 BP) | Energia Park |
| 14:30 | Try: Elmes Kinlan; Baker; Boyne; Whelan; Con: O'Sullivan Sexton (1/4) | Report | Try: Pearse (2); Ugwueru; Flannery; Corey; Con: Finn (4/5) |

| 23 August 2025 | (1 BP) Connacht Women (Ireland) | 12–17 | (Ireland) Leinster Women | Dexcom Stadium, Galway |
| 14:30 | Try: Dixon; Oviawe; Con: Nic Dhonnacha (1/2) | Report | Try: Burke; Layde; Elmes Kinlan; Con: O'Sullivan Sexton (1/3) | Referee: John Lillis (Ireland) |

Final

| 30 August 2025 | Leinster Women (Ireland) | 15–50 | (Ireland) Munster Women | Donnybrook Stadium |
| 16:30 | Try: Whelan (2); Elmes Kinlan | Report, 2 | Try: Pearse; Nic a Bháird 2 Corey; Óg O'Leary; Finn; Cahill; Con: Finn (6/7); Pen: Finn | Referee: Daniel Carson (Ireland) |

=== Celtic Challenge ===
The 2025–26 Celtic Challenge was the fourth season of the Celtic Challenge, a cross-border women's rugby union competition with teams from Ireland, Wales and Scotland. The six-team tournament featured a double-round robin fixture series, with each team playing the others both home and away. For the first time, the competition will include a finals series with semi-finals and a grand final.

Wolfhounds, a combined team representing Leinster and Ulster, return as two-time defending champions.

==== Table ====
| Pos | Team | Pld | W | D | L | PF | PA | PD | TF | TA | TB | LB | Pts | Qualification |
|---|---|---|---|---|---|---|---|---|---|---|---|---|---|---|
| 1 | (Ireland) Wolfhounds (Q) | 10 | 9 | 0 | 1 | 431 | 127 | +304 | 66 | 20 | 9 | 0 | 45 | Play-offs |
| 2 | (Ireland) Clovers (Q) | 10 | 8 | 0 | 2 | 294 | 231 | +63 | 48 | 37 | 7 | 0 | 39 | Play-offs |
| 3 | (Wales) Gwalia Lightning (Q) | 10 | 4 | 0 | 6 | 217 | 212 | +5 | 34 | 35 | 5 | 4 | 25 | Play-offs |
| 4 | (Wales) Brython Thunder (Q) | 10 | 5 | 0 | 5 | 150 | 218 | −68 | 24 | 35 | 2 | 1 | 23 | Play-offs |
| 5 | (Scotland) Glasgow Warriors | 10 | 2 | 0 | 8 | 154 | 236 | −82 | 32 | 49 | 6 | 3 | 17 | |
| 6 | (Scotland) Edinburgh Rugby | 10 | 2 | 0 | 8 | 152 | 321 | −169 | 19 | 37 | 3 | 1 | 12 | |

First match(es) will be played: 20 December 2025. Source: Celtic Challenge
Rules for classification: Four points for a win, two points for a draw. One bonus point for scoring four or more tries in a match; one bonus point for losing by a margin of seven or less.

==== Matches ====
| 20 December 2025 | (1 BP) Wolfhounds (Ireland) | 34–7 | (Scotland) Edinburgh Rugby | Donnybrook Stadium, Dublin |
| 14:30 | Try: Barrett (2); Daley; Boylan; Higgins; Djougang; Con: O'Brien (2) | Report | Try: Moody; Con: MacRae; Cards: Scarlett Haddow (yellow card) 59' | Referee: Padraic Reidy |

| 3 January 2026 | Clovers (Ireland) | 7–24 | (Ireland) Wolfhounds (1 BP) | Creggs RFC |
| 15:00 | Try: Adams Verling 40+2' c Con: Finn 40+3' | Report | Try: Dalton 6' c O’Connor 37' m Boylan 64' m Higgins 69' c Con: O'Brien (2) 7', 70' | Referee: Shane Tuohy |

| 10 January 2026 | Edinburgh Rugby (Scotland) | 12–50 | (Ireland) Wolfhounds (1 BP) | Edinburgh Rugby Stadium, Edinburgh |
| 15:00 | Try: Bell; Tawake; Con: Marlow | Report | Try: King; Daley; Reilly; Dalton; Marley; Boylan; Corcoran; Flood; Con: O'Brien (4); Moyles |

| 18 January 2026 | (1 BP) Wolfhounds (Ireland) | 69–0 | (Wales) Brython Thunder | Ravenhill Stadium, Belfast |
| 12:00 | Try: Marley; Penalty try Elmes Kinlan (2); O'Connor (2); Djougang; Flood; Clenaghan; Gaffney; Smyth; Con: O'Brien (3); Flood (2) | | Cards: Neumann (yellow card) 17' | Referee: Rob McGreer (Ireland) |

| 25 January 2026 | (1 BP) Wolfhounds (Ireland) | 52–26 | (Scotland) Glasgow Warriors (1 BP) | Musgrave Park, Cork |
| 15:00 | Try: Molloy (2); King; Corrigan; Djougang; Tuite; Óg O’Leary; Elmes Kinlan; Con: Moyles (6/8); Cards: Tuite (yellow card) 61' | Report | Try: Bogan; Darroch; McNamara; Phimister; Con: Warren (3/4) | Referee: Kevin Coffey (Ireland) |

| 1 February 2026 | (1 BP) Wolfhounds (Ireland) | 44–10 | (Wales) Gwalia Lightning | Musgrave Park, Cork |
| 12:30 | Try: Boylan; Higgins; Elmes Kinlan; Daley; Tuite; Reilly; Clenaghan (2); Con: O'Brien; Moyles; Cards: Tuite (yellow card) | Report | Try: Thomas-Bradley; Con: Palmer; Pen: Hughes | Referee: Tomás O'Sullivan (Ireland) |

| 15 February 2026 | Glasgow Warriors (Scotland) | 26–42 | (Ireland) Wolfhounds | Scotstoun Stadium, Glasgow |
| 14:00 | Try: McNamara; Sutcliffe; Coubrough; Warren; Con: Warren (3) | | Try: Corrigan; King (2); Smyth; Tuite; Reilly; Con: Myles (6); Cards: Daley (yellow card) | Referee: Murray Oliver |

| 21 February 2026 | Brython Thunder (Wales) | 14–0 | (Ireland) Wolfhounds | Parc y Scarlets, Llanelli |
| 12:30 | Try: Williams; Picton-Powell; Con: Marshall (2) | Report |

| 28 February 2026 | Gwalia Lightning (Wales) | 7–52 | (Ireland) Wolfhounds (1 BP) | CSE, Ystrad Mynach |
| 13:00 | Try: Lewis; Con: Hughes | | Try: King; Corrigan (2); Djougang; Higgins; Daley; Larn; Flood; Con: O'Brien (6/8) |

| 7 March 2026 | (1 BP) Wolfhounds (Ireland) | 43–20 | (Ireland) Clovers (1 BP) | UCD Bowl, Dublin |
| 15:00 | Try: Moore; Daley (2); Marley; King (2); O'Connor; Con: O'Brien (4/7); Cards: Clenaghan (red card) | Report | Try: Parsons; McGann (2); Whelan |

==== Play-offs ====
For the first time, the Celtic Challenge will have play-offs to crown a champion, with the top four teams in the regular season advancing to semi-finals, followed by a grand final. With their 52–7 victory of third-placed Gwalia Lightning in round 9, Wolfhounds ensured that both Irish franchises would have a home nation semi-final; both matches were fixed for the Dexcom Stadium, Galway, while the final will take place in a preselected venue, Edinburgh's Hive Stadium.

On 21 March both Irish franchises defeated their Welsh semi-final opposition to set up an all-Ireland final for 28 March, guaranteeing a fourth consecutive Irish champion of the Challenge. On 28 March, Wolfhounds won their third title, defeating Clovers 50 - 29.

Semi-finals
21 March 2026 – Galway
(Ireland) Wolfhounds | 36
(Wales) Brython Thunder | 10
21 March 2026 – Galway
(Ireland) Clovers | 35
(Wales) Gwalia Lightning | 20

Final
28 March 2026 – Edinburgh Rugby Stadium, Edinburgh
(Ireland) Wolfhounds | 50
(Ireland) Clovers | 29

=== Semi-finals ===
21 March 2026
14:30

| Wolfhounds (Ireland) | 36–10 | (Wales) Brython Thunder |
| Try: Naoise Smyth; Stacey Flood (2); Niamh Higgins; Vicky Elmes Kinlan; Robyn O'Connor; Con: Dannah O'Brien (3) | Report | Try: Branwen Metcalfe; Jorja Aiono |

Dexcom Stadium, Galway
Referee: John Lillis (IRFU)

21 March 2026
12:00

| Clovers (Ireland) | 35–20 | (Wales) Gwalia Lightning |
| Try: Beth Buttimer; Béibhinn Parsons; Alana McInerney (2); Ruth Campbell; Con: Enya Breen (5) | Report, 2 | Try: Alaw Pyrs (2); Caitlin Lewis; Con: Carys Hughes; Pen: Hughes |

Dexcom Stadium, Galway
Referee: Paul O’Connor (IRFU)

=== Final ===
28 March 2026
15:00

| Wolfhounds (Ireland) | 50 - 29 | (Ireland) Clovers |
| Try: Vicky Elmes Kinlan (2); Linda Djougang (2); Erin King (2); Maeve Óg O’Leary; Caoimhe Molloy; Con: Dannah O’Brien (4); Abby Moyles | Report | Try: Niamh Murphy; Eilís Cahill (2); Béibhinn Parsons (2); Con: Enya Breen (2); Cards: Ailish Quinn (yellow card) |

Edinburgh Rugby Stadium, Edinburgh
Referee: Jonny Mackenzie (SRU)
