= 2025–26 Munster Rugby season =

Munster Rugby
- 2025–26 season
- Head coach: Clayton McMillan
- Chief executive: Ian Flanagan
- United Rugby Championship: Quarter-final; 5th (regular season)
- Champions Cup: Eliminated at group stage
- Challenge Cup: Round of 16
- URC Irish Shield: 2nd
- Highest home attendance: 26,006 (URC); 36,208 (ERCC)
- Lowest home attendance: 8,422
- Average home attendance: 16,791
Home colours	Away colours	Third colours

The 2025–26 season is Munster Rugby's fifth in the United Rugby Championship, and their 138th season of representative rugby since their foundation. Along with competing in the URC and its Irish Shield competition, the club also participated in the 2025–26 European Rugby Champions Cup, their 32nd season of European and professional competition, and will participate in the knockout stages of the 2025–26 EPCR Challenge Cup.

For the first time, Munster will bring a competitive in-season fixture to the 45,000 capacity Páirc Uí Chaoimh, the principal Gaelic Athletic Association stadium in Cork, with one of the two European Rugby Champions Cup home matches designated for the venue. Munster had previously played a number of high-profile 'friendly fixtures' at the venue. Munster will become the third Irish province to bring a major competitive home fixture to a larger GAA ground, Munster having played away fixtures against both Leinster at Croke Park, and Connacht at MacHale Park, in the previous season.

Munster appointed a new head coach for the 2025–26 season, Clayton McMillan. McMillan was previously head coach of Super Rugby side, The Chiefs.

== Munster men ==
=== Players in ===
- (Ireland) Lee Barron from (Ireland) Leinster
- (Ireland) Michael Milne from (Ireland) Leinster
- (England) Dan Kelly from (England) Leicester Tigers
- (Ireland) JJ Hanrahan from (Ireland) Connacht
- (Ireland) Andrew Smith from (Ireland) Connacht
- (Ireland) Kieran Ryan (promoted from Academy)
- (Ireland) Evan O'Connell (promoted from Academy)
- (Ireland) Ruadhán Quinn (promoted from Academy)
- (Ireland) Fionn Gibbons (promoted from Academy)
- (Samoa) Michael Alaalatoa from (France) Clermont
- (New Zealand) Ben O'Donovan from (New Zealand) Canterbury

=== Players out ===
- (Ireland) Peter O'Mahony (retired)
- (Ireland) Stephen Archer (retired)
- (Ireland) Dave Kilcoyne (retired)
- (Ireland) Liam Coombes (released)
- (Ireland) Jack Daly (released)
- (Ireland) Jack Oliver (released)
- (Ireland) Patrick Campbell to (England) Ealing Trailfinders
- (Ireland) Scott Buckley to (England) Ealing Trailfinders
- (Ireland) Billy Burns to (Japan) Shimizu Koto Blue Sharks
- (Ireland) Cian Hurley to (New Zealand) Southland
- (Ireland) Rory Scannell to (England) Ealing Trailfinders
- (Ireland) Conor Murray (retired)

=== Full squad ===
Munster Rugby senior squad
Prop: (Ireland) John Ryan, 36; (Samoa) Michael Alaalatoa, 34; (Ireland) Conor Bartley, 30; (Ireland) Oli Jager, 30; (Ireland) Jeremy Loughman, 29; (United States) Roman Salanoa, 27; (Ireland) Josh Wycherley, 25; (Ireland) Michael Milne, 25; (Ireland) Mark Donnelly, 24; (Ireland) Kieran Ryan, 23; (Ireland) Darragh McSweeney, 22; (Ireland) Ronan Foxe, 22; (Ireland) George Hadden, 22; (Ireland) Emmett Calvey, 20; Hooker: (Ireland) Niall Scannell, 33; (Ireland) Diarmuid Barron, 26; (Ireland) Lee Barron, 24; (Ireland) Max Clein, 21; (Ireland) Danny Sheahan, 21; Lock: (Ireland) Tadhg Beirne, 33; (South Africa) Jean Kleyn, 31; (Ireland) Fineen Wycherley, 27; (Ireland) Tom Ahern, 25; (Ireland) Edwin Edogbo, 22; (Ireland) Conor Ryan, 21; (Ireland) Evan O'Connell, 21; (Ireland) Michael Foy, 19; (Ireland) Conor Kennelly, 19	Back Row: (Ireland) Jack O'Donoghue, 31; (Ireland) Gavin Coombes, 27; (Ireland) John Hodnett, 26; (Ireland) Alex Kendellen, 24; (Ireland) Ruadhán Quinn, 21; (Ireland) Brian Gleeson, 21; (Ireland) Seán Edogbo, 21; (Ireland) Luke Murphy, 20; (Ireland) Oisin Minogue, 19; Scrum-Half: (Ireland) Paddy Patterson, 26; (Ireland) Craig Casey, 26; (Ireland) Ethan Coughlan, 23; (Ireland) Jack Oliver, 22; (Ireland) Jake O'Riordan, 20; Fly-Half: (Ireland) JJ Hanrahan, 32; (Ireland) Jack Crowley, 25; (Ireland) Tony Butler, 23; (Ireland) Dylan Hicks, 20; (Ireland) Tom Wood, 20	Centre: (Ireland) Tom Farrell, 31; (New Zealand) Alex Nankivell, 28; (Ireland) Shane Daly, 28; (Ireland) Seán O'Brien, 27; (England) Dan Kelly, 24; (Ireland) Fionn Gibbons, 23; (Ireland) Gordon Wood, 20; (Ireland) Gene O'Leary Kareem, 20; (Ireland) Eoghan Smyth, 20; Wing: (Ireland) Calvin Nash, 27; (Ireland) Diarmuid Kilgallen, 25; (Ireland) Andrew Smith, 24; (Ireland) Shay McCarthy, 22; Fullback: (Ireland) Mike Haley, 31; (South Africa) Thaakir Abrahams, 26; (Ireland) Ben O'Connor, 20
(c) denotes the team captain. Players and their allocated positions from the Munster Rugby website.

=== Pre-season and friendlies ===
Munster's men will begin their season with two pre-season friendlies against English opposition. Both ties will be reversals of upcoming European Rugby Champions Cup pool matches.

5 September 2025	Gloucester (England)	14–12	(Ireland) Munster	Kingsholm Stadium
19:30		Report

12 September 2025	Munster (Ireland)	28–28	(England) Bath	Musgrave Park, Cork
19:00		Report

Munster will also play a friendly match against Argentina XV during the 2025 end-of-year rugby union internationals at Thomond Park.

1 November 2025	Munster (Ireland)	v	Argentina XV	Thomond Park
17:00

=== United Rugby Championship ===
==== Matches ====
27 September 2025	Scarlets (Wales)	21–34	(Ireland) Munster (1 BP)	Parc y Scarlets, Llanelli
17:30	Try: Murray 48' c Mee 64' c Plumtree 75' c Con: Costelow (2) 49', 65'; Hawkins 76'	Report	Try: Casey 10' c Haley 42' c D. Kelly 59' c Ahern 69' c Con: Hanrahan 12'; Crowley (3) 43', 60', 70'; Pen: Hanrahan (2) 23', 29'	Attendance: 9,078; Referee: Sam Grove-White

4 October 2025	Munster (Ireland)	23–20	(Wales) Cardiff (2 BP)	Thomond Park, Limerick
19:45	Try: Quinn 29' m Coombes 52' c Barron 61' m Con: Crowley 53'; Pen: Crowley 67'; Drop: Crowley 77'	Report	Try: J. Adams 15' m Bowen (3) 44', 57', 80+2'	Attendance: 12,066

10 October 2025	(1 BP) Munster (Ireland)	20–19	(Scotland) Edinburgh (1 BP)	Musgrave Park, Cork
19:45	Try: A. Smith 2' m Milne (2) 33' m, 58' m F. Wycherley 72' m	report	Try: Ashman 7' m Vellacott 15' c Graham 48' c Con: Healy (2) 16', 49'; Cards: Young (yellow card) 28'; Rae (yellow card) 30'; Douglas (yellow card) 53'; Graham (yellow card) 68'	Attendance: 8,800; Referee: Ben Whitehouse (Wales)

18 October 2025	Leinster	14–31	Munster (1 BP)	Croke Park, Dublin
17:15	Try: Kelleher 7' c Penny 79' c Con: Prendergast (2) 8', 80+1'; Cards: Frawley (yellow card) 77'	Report; MOTM: Jack Crowley	Try: Gleeson 17' c Tom Farrell 23' c Coughlan 37' c Penalty try 76'; Con: Crowley (3) 18', 24', 38'; Pen: Crowley 49'; Cards: Coombes (yellow card) 79'	Attendance: 51,859; Referee: Gianluca Gnecchi (Italy)

25 October 2025	Munster (Ireland)	17–15	(Ireland) Connacht (1 BP)	Thomond Park, Limerick
19:45	Try: O'Donoghue (2) 15' m, 67' m Kilgallen 33' c Con: JJ Hanrahan 33'	Report	Try: Ralston (2) 20' m, 28' m Boyle 42' m	Attendance: 16,512; Referee: Andrea Piardi (Italy)

29 November 2025	(1 BP) Munster (Ireland)	21–27	(South Africa) Stormers	Thomond Park, Limerick
17:30	Try: Beirne 8' c Hodnett 20' c Crowley 27' c Con: Crowley (3/3) 8', 20', 28'; Cards: Coombes (yellow card) 58'	Report	Try: A. Smith 58' c Maart 68' c Nel 72' c Con: Matthee (3/3) 59', 69', 72'; Pen: Matthee (2) 6', 12'; Cards: Evans (yellow card) 3'; Theunissen (yellow card) 20'	Attendance: 14,421; Referee: Andrea Piardi (Italy)

20 December 2025	Ospreys (Wales)	10–26	(Ireland) Munster (1 BP)	Brewery Field, Bridgend
17:30	Try: Morris 54' c Con: Edwards 55'; Pen: Edwards 11'; Cards: Nagy (yellow card) 15'	Report	Try: Daly 17' m Baron 36' c Crowley 40+1' c Haley 48' c Con: Crowley (3/4) 37', 40+2', 49; Cards: O'Donoghue (yellow card) 54'	Attendance: 4,715; Referee: Sam Grove-White

27 December 2025	(1 BP) Munster (Ireland)	8–13	(Ireland) Leinster	Thomond Park, Limerick
19:45	Try: Kelly 70' m Pen: Crowley 55'	Report	Try: Van der Flier 6' c Con: Byrne 7'; Pen: Byrne (2) 53', 59'	Attendance: 26,006; Referee: Peter Martin (Ireland)

2 January 2026	Ulster (Ireland)	28–3	(Ireland) Munster	Ravenhill Stadium, Belfast
19:45	Try: Stewart 48' c Flannery 55' m B Ward 72' c Con: Doak (2) 49', 72'; Pen: Doak (3) 5', 25', 43'	Report	Pen: Hanrahan 28'	Attendance: 18,196; Referee: Mike Adamson (Scotland)

23 January 2026	Munster (Ireland)	22–20	(Wales) Dragons (1 BP)	Musgrave Park, Cork
19:45	Try: Gleeson 39' c Coombes (2) 57' m, 65' c Con: Butler (2/3) 40', 66'; Pen: Butler 75'	Report	Try: Coghlan 17' c Richards 53' c Con: O'Brien (2/2) 18', 54'; Pen: O'Brien (2) 11', 30'; Cards: Beddall (yellow card) 19'	Attendance: 8,422; Referee: Hollie Davidson (Scotland)

30 January 2026	(1 BP) Glasgow Warriors (Scotland)	31–22	(Ireland) Munster (1 BP)	Scotstoun Stadium, Glasgow
19:45	Try: Smith 7' c Lancaster 8' c Oguntibeju 33' c McKay 40' c Con: Lancaster (4/4) 8', 9', 34', 40+1'; Pen: Lancaster 74'	Report	Try: Coughlan 11' m Kelly 51' m Gleeson 61' m Kilgallen 67' c Con: Wood (1/2) 68'; Cards: Abrahams (yellow card) 39'; O'Donoghue (yellow card) 80+3'	Attendance: 7,351; Referee: Craig Evans (Wales)

28 February 2026	Munster (Ireland)	21–7	(Italy) Zebre Parma	Thomond Park, Limerick
17:30	Try: Daly 7' c Kendellen 65' c Barron 71' c Con: JJ Hanrahan (3/3) 8', 66', 72'	Report	Try: Stavile 32' c Con: Da Re, 33'; Cards: Bertaccini (yellow card) 3'	Attendance: 12,558; Referee: Mike Adamson (Scotland)

21 March 2026	(1 BP) Sharks (South Africa)	45–0	(Ireland) Munster	Kings Park Stadium, Durban
15:00	Try: Buthelezi 7' c Giliomee 28' m Ganyane 51' c v. Heerden 57' c Malan 77' c Mapimpi (2) 79' c, 80+1' m Con: Hendrikse (3/4) 8', 51', 58'; J Smith (2/3) 78' , 80'	Report		Attendance: 14,539

28 March 2026	(1 BP) Bulls (South Africa)	34–31	(Ireland) Munster (2 BP)	Loftus Versfeld Stadium, Pretoria
12:00	Try: Papier (2) 30' c, 47' c Moodie 35' c Jooste 58' c Con: Pollard (4/4) 31', 36', 47', 59'; Pen: Pollard 61', 73'; Cards: Nortje (yellow card) 33'	Report	Try: O'Brien 20' c Ahern (2) 42' m, 52' c O'Connor 67' c E Edogbo 75' m Con: Crowley (3/5) 21', 53', 68'	Attendance: 9,561; Referee: Sam Grove-White

18 April 2026	Benetton (Italy)	15–45	(Ireland) Munster (1 BP)	Stadio Comunale di Monigo, Treviso
19:45	Try: Bernasconi 32' c Garbisi 80' m Con: Umaga (1/2) 52'; Pen: Umaga 28'	Report	Try: Nash 7' c Farrell 17' m Coombes 34' c Kleyn 46' c Kendellen 56' m Beirne 59' c Gleeson 78' c Con: Crowley 8', 35', 46', 59', 79'; Cards: Crowley (yellow card) 63'; Casey (yellow card) 66'	Attendance: 5,000; Referee: Ben Whitehouse (Wales)

25 April 2026	(1 BP) Munster (Ireland)	41–14	(Ireland) Ulster	Thomond Park, Limerick
17:30	Try: Hodnett (4) 24' m, 29' c, 55' m, 68' m Kendellen (3) 47' m, 53' c, 69' c Con: JJ Hanrahan (3/7) 30', 53', 70'	Report, 2	Try: King 13' c Andrew 65' c Con: Flannery (2) 13', 66'; Cards: Brigg (yellow card) 23'	Attendance: 17,364; Referee: Sam Grove-White (Scotland)

9 May 2026	(1 BP) Connacht (Ireland)	26–7	(Ireland) Munster	The Sportsground, Galway
19:45	Try: B Murphy 13' c Bolton 21' m Hurley-Langton 34' c Jansen 72' c Con: Gilbert (3/4) 13', 35', 73'	Report	Try: Casey 68' c Con: Hanrahan 69'; Cards: Barron (red card) 16'	Attendance: 12,481; Referee: Peter Martin (Ireland)

16 May 2026	Munster (Ireland)	24–17	(South Africa) Lions (1 BP)	Thomond Park, Limerick
19:45	Try: O'Connell 7' c Casey 41' c Ahern 54' c Con: JJ Hanrahan (3/3) 8', 42', 54'; Pen: JJ Hanrahan 23'; Cards: A Smith (yellow card) 27'; O'Brien (yellow card) 30'	Report	Try: Q. Horn 14' c Mpeku 35' c Con: CW Smith (2/2) 15', 36'; Pen: CW Smith 60'	Attendance: 12,301; Referee: Andrea Piardi (Italy)

==== Standings ====
Pos	Team	Pld	W	D	L	PF	PA	PD	TF	TA	TB	LB	Pts	Qualification
1	Glasgow Warriors	18	13	0	5	479	338	+141	72	48	11	2	65	Qualification for the Champions Cup and knockout stage
2	Leinster (CH)	18	12	0	6	515	370	+145	77	51	13	2	63	Qualification for the Champions Cup and knockout stage
3	Stormers	18	12	1	5	504	344	+160	63	48	9	1	60	Qualification for the Champions Cup and knockout stage
4	Bulls (RU)	18	12	0	6	576	406	+170	82	59	10	1	59	Qualification for the Champions Cup and knockout stage
5	Munster	18	11	0	7	396	376	+20	59	51	8	3	55	Qualification for the Champions Cup and knockout stage
6	Cardiff	18	11	0	7	353	372	−19	52	52	7	4	55	Qualification for the Champions Cup and knockout stage
7	Lions	18	10	1	7	532	473	+59	73	70	9	3	54	Qualification for the Champions Cup and knockout stage
8	Connacht	18	10	0	8	442	395	+47	62	56	10	4	54	Qualification for the Champions Cup and knockout stage
9	Ulster	18	9	1	8	494	420	+74	72	60	10	4	52	Qualification for the Challenge Cup
10	Sharks	18	8	1	9	467	428	+39	71	57	9	3	46	Qualification for the Challenge Cup
11	Ospreys	18	7	2	9	376	454	−78	55	69	4	3	39	Qualification for the Challenge Cup
12	Edinburgh	18	7	0	11	362	439	−77	57	66	6	4	38	Qualification for the Challenge Cup
13	Benetton	18	6	2	10	327	493	−166	41	71	4	1	33	Qualification for the Challenge Cup
14	Scarlets	18	4	2	12	361	460	−99	52	63	3	5	28	Qualification for the Challenge Cup
15	Dragons	18	3	4	11	350	481	−131	46	71	4	4	28	Qualification for the Challenge Cup
16	Zebre	18	2	0	16	312	587	−275	43	85	3	4	15	Qualification for the Challenge Cup

Updated to match(es) played on 16 May 2026. Source: UnitedRugby.com
Rules for classification: Tiebreakers for teams tied on points: 1) Number of matches won 2) The difference between points for and points against 3) The number of tries scored 4) The most points scored 5) The difference between tries for and tries against 6) The fewest red cards received 7) The fewest yellow cards received.

==== Playoffs ====
The top eight teams in the regular season standings advance to the knockout stage, a single-elimination tournament culminating in a Grand Final to crown the overall champion.

Teams are seeded based on the regular season standings, with teams ranked 1–4 receiving home field advantage in the quarter-final, with 1 playing 8, 2 playing 7 etc. The top two teams in the standings are seeded so as not to meet until the Grand Final.

Home-field advantage for the semi-finals and Grand Final will be awarded to the highest-ranked team in each tie; the top two teams are therefore guaranteed home advantage until the final for as long as they remain in the tournament, and the top ranked team, Glasgow Warriors, in the standings will be awarded home advantage should they reach the Grand Final. In the build up to the final week of the regular season, it was reported that Glasgow Warriors may be forced to play a semi-final and final outside Scotland due to venue unavailability, although they would technically remain the home team. In the week of the quarter-final, it was announced they would, if they progressed, play their semi-final and Grand Final on home soil, at Murrayfield Stadium, Edinburgh.

Cardiff and Lions both made the play-offs for the first time. Stormers, Glasgow Warriors, Leinster, Munster and Bulls reached their fifth URC play-off phase from five seasons. Glasgow Warriors became the first non-Irish team to top the regular season table and take the number one seeding since they did so themselves in 2019.

Quarter-finals
1	(Scotland) Glasgow Warriors	33
8	(Ireland) Connacht	21
4	(South Africa) Bulls	45
5	(Ireland) Munster	14
3	(South Africa) Stormers	44
6	(Wales) Cardiff	21
2	(Ireland) Leinster	59
7	(South Africa) Lions	10

Semi-finals
1	(Scotland) Glasgow Warriors	21
4	(South Africa) Bulls	22
2	(Ireland) Leinster	20
3	(South Africa) Stormers	11

Final
2	(Ireland) Leinster	36
4	(South Africa) Bulls	7

Quarter-final'

30 May 2026	Bulls (South Africa) (4)	45–14	(5) (Ireland) Munster	Loftus Versfeld Stadium, Pretoria
13:00	Try: Papier (2) 5' c, 54' c Arendse 8' c Grobbelaar 35' c Hanekom 39' c Jacobs 59' c Con: Pollard(6/6) 5', 10', 36', 40', 54', 60'; Pen: Pollard 23'	Report	Try: O'Donoghue 20' c Nankivell 32' c Con: Hanrahan (2/2) 20', 33'	Attendance: 18,756; Referee: Andrea Piardi (Italy)

==== URC Irish Shield ====
2025–26 United Rugby Championship Regional Shield tables
(Ireland) Irish Shield
	Team	P	W	D	L	PF	PA	PD	TF	TA	TBP	LBP	Pts	Pos overall
1	(Ireland) Leinster	6	5	0	1	166	120	+46	23	15	4	0	24	2
2	(Ireland) Munster	6	3	0	3	126	91	+35	16	15	2	1	15	5
3	(Ireland) Connacht	6	2	0	4	131	157	–27	18	21	2	2	12	8
4	(Ireland) Ulster	6	2	0	4	131	147	–16	18	22	1	2	11	9
If teams are level at any stage, tiebreakers are applied in the following order: 1. number of matches won 2. the difference between points for and points against 3. the number of tries scored 4. the most points scored 5. the difference between tries for and tries against 6. the fewest red cards received 7. the fewest yellow cards received
Green background indicates teams currently leading the regional shield. Upon the conclusion of the regular season, these teams win their respective regional shields. (S) : URC Shield champion

=== European Rugby Champions Cup ===
Munster have been drawn in Pool 2 of the European Rugby Champions Cup, along with URC colleagues Edinburgh (whom Munster will not play in line with the rules of the competition), along with Bath, Castres, Gloucester and Toulon.

European Rugby Champions Cup Pool 2
Pos	Team	Pld	W	D	L	PF	PA	PD	TF	TA	TB	LB	Pts	Qualification
1	(England) Bath (4)	4	3	0	1	180	89	+91	25	10	4	0	16	Home Champions Cup round of 16
2	(France) Toulon (7)	4	3	0	1	123	106	+17	14	13	2	0	14	Home Champions Cup round of 16
3	(France) Castres (12)	4	2	0	2	98	106	−8	13	15	2	0	10	Away Champions Cup round of 16
4	(Scotland) Edinburgh (14)	4	2	0	2	69	140	−71	9	18	2	0	10	Away Champions Cup round of 16
5	(Ireland) Munster (10CC)	4	1	0	3	99	101	−2	15	13	2	2	8	Away Challenge Cup round of 16
6	(England) Gloucester	4	1	0	3	75	102	−27	8	15	1	1	6	

Source: EPCR
Rules for classification: Tiebreakers for teams tied on points: 1) Number of matches won; 2) Difference between points for and against; 3) Total number of points for; 4) Aggregate number of points scored in matches between tied teams; 5) Number of matches won excluding the first match, then the second and so on until the tie is settled.

Pool matches

6 December 2025	(1 BP) Bath (England)	40–14	(Ireland) Munster	Recreation Ground, Bath
20:00	Try: Penalty try 5'; Reid 9' c Arundell 11' c Dunn 18' c Obano 37' c Hill 77' m Con: Russell (4/5) 10', 12', 19', 38'; Cards: Stuart (yellow card) 28'	Report	Try: Edogbo 22' c Casey 40' c Con: Hanrahan (2/2) 23', 40+1'; Cards: Beirne (yellow card) 5'	Attendance: 14,506; Referee: Jeremy Rozier (France)

13 December 2025	(1 BP) Munster (Ireland)	31–3	(England) Gloucester	Páirc Uí Chaoimh, Cork
17:30	Try: Kelly 21' c Haley 50' m Quinn 68' c Farrell 73' c Beirne 76' m Con: Crowley (3/5) 22', 69', 74'	Report	Pen: Barton 3'; Cards: Ford-Robinson (yellow card) 32'; James (yellow card) 67'	Attendance: 36,208; Referee: Ben Breakspear (Wales)

11 January 2026	Toulon (France)	27–25	(Ireland) Munster (1 BP)	Stade Mayol, Toulon
14:00	Try: Domon 38' c White 43' c Dréan 49' c Con: Domon (3/3) 39', 44', 50'; Pen: Domon (2/2) 64', 75'; Cards: Abadie (yellow card) 56'; Ollivon (yellow card) 68'	Report	Try: Nash 46' c O'Donoghue 67' m Farrell 71' c Con: Crowley (2/3) 47', 72'; Pen: Crowley (2/2) 16', 31'; Cards: Beirne (yellow card) 36'; Nankivell (yellow card) 54'	Attendance: 16,776; Referee: Karl Dickson (England)

17 January 2026	(2 BP) Munster (Ireland)	29–31	(France) Castres (1 BP)	Thomond Park, Limerick
17:30	Try: Casey (2) 17' c 34' m Abrahams 46' m Edogbo (2) 59' m, 78' c Con: Crowley (2/5) 18', 78'; Cards: Farrell (yellow card) 63'	Report	Try: Karawalevu 10' c Chabouni 38' c Palis 67' c Ambadiang 72' c Con: Fernandez (2/2) 11', 39'; Herve (2/2) 68', 73'; Pen: Fernandez (1/1) 2'; Cards: Nakarawa (yellow card) 75'	Attendance: 20,043; Referee: Matthew Carley (England)

==== Knockout stage : EPCR Challenge Cup ====
Munster's loss to Castre in their final Champions Cup pool game confirmed their fifth-place finish in the pool, qualifying them for an away tie in the last sixteen of the second-tier 2025–26 EPCR Challenge Cup against Exeter Chiefs.

Round of 16
1	(France) Montpellier	53
16	(France) Perpignan	13
8	(Ireland) Connacht	29
9	(South Africa) Sharks	12
5	(Italy) Zebre Parma	31
12	(France) Pau	15
4	(France) Stade Français	31
13	(Wales) Dragons	36
3	(Ireland) Ulster	28
14	(Wales) Ospreys	24
6	(England) Newcastle Red Bulls	18
11	(France) La Rochelle	26
2	(Italy) Benetton	38
15	(Wales) Cardiff	35
7	(England) Exeter Chiefs	31
10	(Ireland) Munster	21

Quarter-finals
1	(France) Montpellier	45
8	(Ireland) Connacht	22
5	(Italy) Zebre Parma	32
13	(Wales) Dragons	35
3	(Ireland) Ulster	41
11	(France) La Rochelle	24
2	(Italy) Benetton	41
7	(England) Exeter Chiefs	44

Semi-finals
1	(France) Montpellier	18
13	(Wales) Dragons	12
3	(Ireland) Ulster	29
7	(England) Exeter Chiefs	12

Final
1	(France) Montpellier	59
3	(Ireland) Ulster	26

Round of 16

4 April 2026	Exeter Chiefs (England) (7)	31–21	(10) (Ireland) Munster	Sandy Park, Exeter
12:30	Try: Vintcent 13' c Slade 20' c Rigg 33' c Feyi-Waboso 38' c Con: Slade (4/4) 14', 21', 34', 40'; Pen: Slade (1/1) 28'	Report	Try: Crowley (2) 49' c, 75' c Beirne 68' c Con: Crowley (3/3) 50', 68', 75'; Cards: Beirne (yellow card) 73'	Attendance: 11,636; Referee: Jeremy Rozier (France)

== Munster Women ==
=== IRFU Women's Interprovincial Series ===
The 2025 IRFU Women's Interprovincial Series is being contested by women's teams representing the four provincial rugby unions of Ireland, under the same branding and uniforms as the senior men's teams in the United Rugby Championship. The competition currently uses a single round-robin format, similar to the one used in both the Six Nations Championship and the Women's Six Nations Championship. Each team plays the other three teams once.

As in previous seasons the competition also features playoffs and a final.

Leinster Women return as defending champions.

==== Table ====
Pos	Team	Pld	W	D	L	PF	PA	PD	TF	TA	TB	LB	Pts	Qualification or relegation
1	Munster Women (CH)	3	3	0	0	115	44	+71	18	5	3	0	15	Qualified for Interprovincial final
2	Leinster Women (RU)	3	2	0	1	76	66	+10	14	10	2	0	10	Qualified for Interprovincial final
3	Connacht Women	3	1	0	2	27	66	−39	5	12	0	1	5	Qualified for third/fourth place final
4	Ulster Women	3	0	0	3	43	87	−44	7	15	0	1	1	Qualified for third/fourth place final

First match(es) will be played: Unknown. Source: Unknown
Rules for classification: 1) competition points; 2) match points difference; 3) match points for

==== Matches ====
10 August 2025
14:30

(1 BP) Munster Women (Ireland)	44-5	(Ireland) Connacht Women
Try: Burke; Ugwueru (3); Corey; Nunan; Flannery; Heylmann; Con: Finn (2/8)	Report	Try: Ryder

Musgrave Park, Cork
Referee: Euan O'Riordan (Ireland)

16 August 2025
14:30

(1 BP) Leinster Women (Ireland)	22–33	(Ireland) Munster Women (1 BP)
Try: Elmes Kinlan; Baker; Boyne; Whelan; Con: O'Sullivan Sexton (1/4)	Report	Try: Pearse (2); Ugwueru; Flannery; Corey; Con: Finn (4/5)

Donnybrook Stadium, Dublin

23 August 2025
16:15

Ulster Women (Ireland)	17–38	(Ireland) Munster Women (1 BP)
Try: Sheerin; Fitzsimons 2 Con: Sheerin (1/3)	Report	Try: Pearse; Ugwueru; Finn; Óg O'Leary (2); McInerney; Con: Finn (4/6)

Ravenhill Stadium, Belfast
Referee: Dermot Blake (Ireland)

Interprovincial final

30 August 2025
16:30

Leinster Women (Ireland)	15–50	(Ireland) Munster Women
Try: Whelan (2); Elmes Kinlan	Report, 2	Try: Pearse; Nic a Bháird (2); Corey; Óg O'Leary; Finn; Cahill; Con: Finn (6/7); Pen: Finn

Donnybrook Stadium, Dublin
Referee: Daniel Carson (Ireland)

=== Celtic Challenge ===
The 2025–26 Celtic Challenge was the fourth season of the Celtic Challenge, a cross-border women's rugby union competition with teams from Ireland, Wales and Scotland. The six-team tournament features a full double round robin fixture series, with each team playing the others both home and away. For the first time, the competition will include a finals series with semi-finals and a grand final.

Clovers, a combined team representing Munster and Connacht, return for a third season.

==== Table ====
Pos	Team	Pld	W	D	L	PF	PA	PD	TF	TA	TB	LB	Pts	Qualification
1	(Ireland) Wolfhounds (Q)	10	9	0	1	431	127	+304	66	20	9	0	45	Play-offs
2	(Ireland) Clovers (Q)	10	8	0	2	294	231	+63	48	37	7	0	39	Play-offs
3	(Wales) Gwalia Lightning (Q)	10	4	0	6	217	212	+5	34	35	5	4	25	Play-offs
4	(Wales) Brython Thunder (Q)	10	5	0	5	150	218	−68	24	35	2	1	23	Play-offs
5	(Scotland) Glasgow Warriors	10	2	0	8	154	236	−82	32	49	6	3	17	
6	(Scotland) Edinburgh Rugby	10	2	0	8	152	321	−169	19	37	3	1	12	

First match(es) will be played: 20 December 2025. Source: Celtic Challenge
Rules for classification: Four points for a win, two points for a draw. One bonus point for scoring four or more tries in a match; one bonus point for losing by a margin of seven or less.

==== Clovers fixtures ====
20 December 2025
11:30

(1 BP) Clovers (Ireland)	35–31	(Wales) Gwalia Lightning (2 BP)
Try: McGrath (2); Murphy; Adams Verling; McGrath; Con: Finn (5); Cards: Murphy (yellow card) 79'	Report	Try: Hill; Greenway; Davies (2); Vucaj; Con: Hughes (3)

Donnybrook Stadium, Dublin
Referee: Dermot Blake

3 January 2026
15:00

Clovers (Ireland)	7–24	(Ireland) Wolfhounds (1 BP)
Try: Adams Verling 40+2' c Con: Finn 40+3'	Report	Try: Dalton 6' c O'Connor 37' m Boylan 64' m Higgins 69' c Con: O'Brien (2) 7', 70'

Creggs RFC
Referee: Shane Tuohy

11 January 2026
12:00

(1 BP) Brython Thunder (Wales)	12–15	(Ireland) Clovers
Try: Williams; Crabb; Con: Marshall	Report	Try: Foley; Linn; Con: Finn; Pen: Finn

Cardiff Arms Park, Cardiff

18 January 2026
15:00

(1 BP) Clovers (Ireland)	57–31	(Scotland) Glasgow Warriors (1 BP)
Try: McInerney (2); Finn; McGann; McGrath; Murphy; Whelan; McGrath; Corey; Con: Finn (6)	Report	Try: McNamara; Flynn (2); Coubrough; Bogan; Con: Ainsworth (3); Cards: Flynn (yellow card) 9'

Ravenhill Stadium, Belfast

25 January 2026
12:00

(1 BP) Clovers (Ireland)	29-12	(Wales) Brython Thunder
Try: McCarthy; Cournane; Lane; Murphy; Corey; Con: Finn (2)	Report	Try: Rogers; Bowden; Con: Williams; Cards: Bluck (yellow card) 15'

Musgrave Park, Cork
Referee: Paudie Sheehan (Ireland)

31 January 2026
14:00

(2 BP) Glasgow Warriors (Scotland)	31–38	(Ireland) Clovers (1 BP)
Try: Coubrough; Bogan; Warren; Penalty try McNamara; Con: Warren; McNamara	Report	Try: Oviawe; McGrath (2); Whelan; McGann; Hession; Con: Finn (3); Hession; Cards: Ugwueru (yellow card) 68'; Oviawe (yellow card) 71'

Scotstoun Stadium, Glasgow
Referee: Ciaran Stark (Scotland)

14 February 2026
13:00

(1 BP) Gwalia Lightning (Wales)	14–19	(Ireland) Clovers
Try: Greenway; Hill; Con: Hughes (2)	Report	Try: Corey; McInerney; Murphy; Con: Hession (2)

CSE, Ystrad Mynach

21 February 2026
12:30

(1 BP) Clovers (Ireland)	31-7	(Scotland) Edinburgh Rugby
Try: Corey; Adams Verling; Ugwueru (2); Buttimer; Con: (3/5)	Report	Try: McMahon; Con: (1/1)

The Sportsground, Galway

28 February 2026
13:00

(1 BP) Edinburgh Rugby (Scotland)	26-43	(Ireland) Clovers (1 BP)
Try: Moody; Mathieson; Haddow; Ferrie; Con: (3/4)		Try: Parsons; Buttimer (2); Campbell; Cahill; McGann; McGrath; Con: (4/7)

Edinburgh Rugby Stadium, Edinburgh

7 March 2026
15:00

(1 BP) Wolfhounds (Ireland)	43-20	(Ireland) Clovers (1 BP)
Try: Moore; Daley (2); Marley; King (2); O'Connor; Con: O'Brien (4/7); Cards: Clenaghan (red card)	Report	Try: Parsons; McGann (2); Whelan

UCD Bowl, Dublin

==== Play-offs ====
For the first time, the Celtic Challenge will have play-offs to crown a champion, with the top four teams in the regular season advancing to semi-finals, followed by a grand final. With their 52–7 victory of third-placed Gwalia Lightning in round 9, Wolfhounds ensured that both Irish franchises would have a home nation semi-final; both matches were fixed for the Dexcom Stadium, Galway, while the final will take place in a preselected venue, Edinburgh's Hive Stadium.

On 21 March both Irish franchises defeated their Welsh semi-final opposition to set up an all-Ireland final for 28 March, guaranteeing a fourth consecutive Irish champion of the Challenge. On 28 March, Wolfhounds won their third title, defeating Clovers 50 - 29.

Semi-finals
21 March 2026 – Galway
(Ireland) Wolfhounds	36
(Wales) Brython Thunder	10
21 March 2026 – Galway
(Ireland) Clovers	35
(Wales) Gwalia Lightning	20

Final
28 March 2026 – Edinburgh Rugby Stadium, Edinburgh
(Ireland) Wolfhounds	50
(Ireland) Clovers	29

=== Semi-finals ===
21 March 2026
14:30

Wolfhounds (Ireland)	36–10	(Wales) Brython Thunder
Try: Naoise Smyth; Stacey Flood (2); Niamh Higgins; Vicky Elmes Kinlan; Robyn O'Connor; Con: Dannah O'Brien (3)	Report	Try: Branwen Metcalfe; Jorja Aiono

Dexcom Stadium, Galway
Referee: John Lillis (IRFU)

21 March 2026
12:00

Clovers (Ireland)	35–20	(Wales) Gwalia Lightning
Try: Beth Buttimer; Béibhinn Parsons; Alana McInerney (2); Ruth Campbell; Con: Enya Breen (5)	Report, 2	Try: Alaw Pyrs (2); Caitlin Lewis; Con: Carys Hughes; Pen: Hughes

Dexcom Stadium, Galway
Referee: Paul O’Connor (IRFU)

=== Final ===
28 March 2026
15:00

Wolfhounds (Ireland)	50 - 29	(Ireland) Clovers
Try: Vicky Elmes Kinlan (2); Linda Djougang (2); Erin King (2); Maeve Óg O’Leary; Caoimhe Molloy; Con: Dannah O’Brien (4); Abby Moyles	Report	Try: Niamh Murphy; Eilís Cahill (2); Béibhinn Parsons (2); Con: Enya Breen (2); Cards: Ailish Quinn (yellow card)

Edinburgh Rugby Stadium, Edinburgh
Referee: Jonny Mackenzie (SRU)
