= 2025–26 European Rugby Champions Cup =

Rugby union competition

Tournament details
- Countries: England; France; Ireland; Scotland; South Africa; Wales
- Tournament format(s): Modified round-robin and knockout
- Date: 5 December 2025 – 23 May 2026

Tournament statistics
- Teams: 24
- Matches played: 63
- Attendance: 1,059,748 (16,821 per match)
- Highest attendance: 52,327 – Bordeaux Bègles v Leinster; 23 May 2026
- Lowest attendance: 4,965 – Sale Sharks v Glasgow Warriors; 5 December 2025
- Tries scored: 519 (8.24 per match)
- Top point scorer(s): (Scotland) Finn Russell (Bath); 81 points
- Top try scorer(s): (France) Louis Bielle-Biarrey (Bordeaux Bègles); 10 tries

Final
- Venue: San Mamés Stadium, Bilbao
- Attendance: 52,327
- Champions: Bordeaux Bègles (2nd title)
- Runners-up: Leinster

The 2025–26 European Rugby Champions Cup (known as the 2025–26 Investec Champions Cup for sponsorship reasons) was the twelfth season of the European Rugby Champions Cup, the annual club rugby union competition run by European Professional Club Rugby (EPCR) for professional clubs. It was the 31st season of the pan-European professional club rugby competition.

The final was played at San Mamés Stadium, Bilbao.

Bordeaux Bègles entered the competition as defending champions with Northampton Saints entering as beaten finalists. On 3 May the final was confirmed to be between reigning champions Bordeaux Bègles in a second successive final, and Irish province Leinster, reaching a record ninth Champions Cup final, and their fourth such final in five seasons.

In the final, Bordeaux Bègles comfortably emerged as winners over the Irish side 41 - 19, to claim their second title, and condemn Leinster to a record fifth final defeat.

== Teams ==
Twenty-four clubs from the three major European domestic and regional leagues qualified for the 2025–26 edition of the Champions Cup. As both European trophy winners from the previous season achieved top eight domestic finishes, qualification was won on league standing alone.

The distribution of teams was:

- England: eight clubs
  - The top eight clubs from the 2024–25 Premiership.
- France: eight clubs
  - The top eight clubs from the 2024–25 Top 14.
- Ireland, Scotland, South Africa and Wales: eight clubs
  - The top eight sides from the 2024–25 United Rugby Championship.

Premiership	Top 14	United Rugby Championship			
England	France	Ireland	Scotland	South Africa	Wales
Bath; Bristol Bears; Gloucester; Harlequins; Leicester Tigers; Northampton Saints; Sale Sharks; Saracens	Bayonne; Bordeaux Bègles; Castres; Clermont; La Rochelle; Pau; Toulouse; Toulon	Leinster; Munster	Edinburgh; Glasgow Warriors	Bulls; Sharks; Stormers	Scarlets

=== Team details ===
Below is the list of coaches, captain and stadiums with their method of qualification for each team.

Team	Coach(es)/ Director of Rugby	Captain(s)	Stadium	Capacity	Method of qualification
(England) Bath	(South Africa) Johann van Graan	(England) Ben Spencer	Recreation Ground	14,509	Premiership top 8
(France) Bayonne	(France) Grégory Patat	(France) Arthur Iturria	Stade Jean-Dauger	14,370	Top 14 top 8
(France) Bordeaux Bègles	(France) Yannick Bru	(France) Jefferson Poirot	Stade Chaban-Delmas	34,694	Top 14 top 8
(England) Bristol Bears	(Samoa) Pat Lam	(England) Fitz Harding	Ashton Gate	27,000	Premiership top 8
(South Africa) Bulls	(South Africa) Johan Ackermann	(South Africa) Ruan Nortjé	Loftus Versfeld	51,762	URC top 8
(France) Castres	(France) Xavier Sadourny	(France) Mathieu Babillot	Stade Pierre-Fabre	12,500	Top 14 top 8
(France) Clermont	(France) Christophe Urios	(France) Baptiste Jauneau	Stade Marcel-Michelin	19,022	Top 14 top 8
(Scotland) Edinburgh	(South Africa) Sean Everitt	(Scotland) Magnus Bradbury	Edinburgh Rugby Stadium	7,800	URC top 8
(Scotland) Glasgow Warriors	(South Africa) Franco Smith	(Scotland) Kyle Steyn	Scotstoun Stadium	7,351	URC top 8
(England) Gloucester	(England) George Skivington	(Wales) Tomos Williams	Kingsholm Stadium	16,115	Premiership top 8
(England) Harlequins	(Australia) Jason Gilmore	(England) Alex Dombrandt	Twickenham Stoop	14,800	Premiership top 8
(France) La Rochelle	(Ireland) Ronan O'Gara	(France) Grégory Alldritt	Stade Marcel-Deflandre	18,000	Top 14 top 8
(England) Leicester Tigers	(England) Geoff Parling	(England) Ollie Chessum	Welford Road Stadium	25,849	Premiership top 8
(Ireland) Leinster	(Ireland) Leo Cullen	(Ireland) Caelan Doris	Aviva Stadium, Dublin	55,000	URC top 8
(Ireland) Munster	(New Zealand) Clayton McMillan	(Ireland) Tadhg Beirne	Thomond Park, Limerick; Páirc Uí Chaoimh, Cork	25,600; 45,000	URC top 8
(England) Northampton Saints	(England) Phil Dowson	(England) George Furbank	Franklin's Gardens	15,200	Premiership top 8
(France) Pau	(France) Sébastien Piqueronies	(France) Lucas Rey	Stade du Hameau	14,999	Top 14 top 8
(England) Sale Sharks	(England) Alex Sanderson	(South Africa) Ernst van Rhyn	Salford Community Stadium	12,000	Premiership top 8
(England) Saracens	(Ireland) Mark McCall	(England) Maro Itoje	StoneX Stadium	10,500	Premiership top 8
(Wales) Scarlets	(Wales) Dwayne Peel	(Wales) Josh Macleod	Parc y Scarlets	14,870	URC top 8
(South Africa) Sharks	(South Africa) JP Pietersen (for (New Zealand) John Plumtree) (Note: Pietersen replaced Plumtree after the opening round after he stepped away from coaches duties at the club.)	(South Africa) André Esterhuizen	Kings Park Stadium	52,000	URC top 8
(South Africa) Stormers	(South Africa) John Dobson	(South Africa) Salmaan Moerat	Cape Town Stadium; Nelson Mandela Bay Stadium	55,000; 46,000	URC top 8
(France) Toulon	(France) Pierre Mignoni	(France) Charles Ollivon	Stade Mayol	17,500	Top 14 top 8
(France) Toulouse	(France) Ugo Mola	(France) Julien Marchand	Stade Ernest-Wallon	19,500	Top 14 top 8

== Draw ==
For the purposes of the draw, the 24 clubs were separated into two tiers, Tier 1 and Tier 2, based on their league finishing position; with the winners of each domestic competition (Bath, Toulouse and Leinster) and the defending Champions Cup winners, Bordeaux Bègles, seeded in the top tier. The remaining twenty teams will be seeded in the second tier.

Like previous seasons, the four pools will be made up of six teams, with each pool containing two clubs from each of leagues; however, clubs from the same URC Shield cannot be in the same pool.

== Pool stage ==
Teams were drawn into pools in Dublin on 2 July 2025. Teams will be awarded four points for a win, two for a draw, one for scoring four tries in a game, and one for losing by fewer than eight points.

Each pool consisted of six teams, two from each of the three contributing leagues. Each team played the four teams not from its own league once with the top four teams advancing to the round of 16, where the top two teams in each group are given home advantage. The fifth placed teams 'dropped' into the Challenge Cup knockout rounds, joining twelve clubs from that competition's pool stages in the knockout stage as the ninth to twelfth seeds, earning away ties with the fifth-to eighth-ranked sides from the Challenge Cup's pool stage. The sixth placed team in each group is eliminated.

=== Pool 1 ===
European Rugby Champions Cup Pool 1
Pos	Team	Pld	W	D	L	PF	PA	PD	TF	TA	TB	LB	Pts	Qualification
1	(Scotland) Glasgow Warriors (2)	4	4	0	0	115	66	+49	17	9	4	0	20	Home Champions Cup round of 16
2	(France) Toulouse (8)	4	2	0	2	168	74	+94	24	11	2	2	12	Home Champions Cup round of 16
3	(England) Sale Sharks (11)	4	2	0	2	89	127	−38	13	18	2	1	11	Away Champions Cup round of 16
4	(England) Saracens (13)	4	2	0	2	93	70	+23	13	14	1	1	10	Away Champions Cup round of 16
5	(South Africa) Sharks (9CC)	4	2	0	2	107	117	−10	16	17	2	0	10	Away Challenge Cup round of 16
6	(France) Clermont	4	0	0	4	57	165	−108	9	25	0	0	0	

Source: EPCR
Rules for classification: Tiebreakers for teams tied on points: 1) Number of matches won; 2) Difference between points for and against; 3) Total number of points for; 4) Aggregate number of points scored in matches between tied teams; 5) Number of matches won excluding the first match, then the second and so on until the tie is settled.

=== Pool 2 ===
European Rugby Champions Cup Pool 2
Pos	Team	Pld	W	D	L	PF	PA	PD	TF	TA	TB	LB	Pts	Qualification
1	(England) Bath (4)	4	3	0	1	180	89	+91	25	10	4	0	16	Home Champions Cup round of 16
2	(France) Toulon (7)	4	3	0	1	123	106	+17	14	13	2	0	14	Home Champions Cup round of 16
3	(France) Castres (12)	4	2	0	2	98	106	−8	13	15	2	0	10	Away Champions Cup round of 16
4	(Scotland) Edinburgh (14)	4	2	0	2	69	140	−71	9	18	2	0	10	Away Champions Cup round of 16
5	(Ireland) Munster (10CC)	4	1	0	3	99	101	−2	15	13	2	2	8	Away Challenge Cup round of 16
6	(England) Gloucester	4	1	0	3	75	102	−27	8	15	1	1	6	

Source: EPCR
Rules for classification: Tiebreakers for teams tied on points: 1) Number of matches won; 2) Difference between points for and against; 3) Total number of points for; 4) Aggregate number of points scored in matches between tied teams; 5) Number of matches won excluding the first match, then the second and so on until the tie is settled.

=== Pool 3 ===
European Rugby Champions Cup Pool 3
Pos	Team	Pld	W	D	L	PF	PA	PD	TF	TA	TB	LB	Pts	Qualification
1	(Ireland) Leinster (3)	4	4	0	0	115	80	+35	16	10	2	0	18	Home Champions Cup round of 16
2	(England) Harlequins (6)	4	3	0	1	184	86	+98	26	14	3	0	15	Home Champions Cup round of 16
3	(South Africa) Stormers (9)	4	3	0	1	117	125	−8	15	19	2	0	14	Away Champions Cup round of 16
4	(England) Leicester Tigers (16)	4	1	0	3	118	115	+3	17	15	2	0	6	Away Champions Cup round of 16
5	(France) La Rochelle (11CC)	4	1	0	3	101	114	−13	15	15	1	1	6	Away Challenge Cup round of 16
6	(France) Bayonne	4	0	0	4	58	173	−115	8	24	0	0	0	

Source: EPCR
Rules for classification: Tiebreakers for teams tied on points: 1) Number of matches won; 2) Difference between points for and against; 3) Total number of points for; 4) Aggregate number of points scored in matches between tied teams; 5) Number of matches won excluding the first match, then the second and so on until the tie is settled.

=== Pool 4 ===
European Rugby Champions Cup Pool 4
Pos	Team	Pld	W	D	L	PF	PA	PD	TF	TA	TB	LB	Pts	Qualification
1	(France) Bordeaux Bègles (1)	4	4	0	0	173	97	+76	27	14	4	0	20	Home Champions Cup round of 16
2	(England) Northampton Saints (5)	4	3	0	1	156	110	+46	23	16	4	0	16	Home Champions Cup round of 16
3	(England) Bristol Bears (10)	4	3	0	1	154	104	+50	23	13	2	0	14	Away Champions Cup round of 16
4	(South Africa) Bulls (15)	4	1	0	3	113	181	−68	17	27	3	0	7	Away Champions Cup round of 16
5	(France) Pau (12CC)	4	1	0	3	110	160	−50	15	23	1	1	6	Away Challenge Cup round of 16
6	(Wales) Scarlets	4	0	0	4	103	157	−54	13	24	2	1	3	

Source: EPCR
Rules for classification: Tiebreakers for teams tied on points: 1) Number of matches won; 2) Difference between points for and against; 3) Total number of points for; 4) Aggregate number of points scored in matches between tied teams; 5) Number of matches won excluding the first match, then the second and so on until the tie is settled.

== Knockout stage ==
The knockout stage followed the same format as used in previous years, beginning with a single-leg round of 16. This round was then followed by the quarter-finals and semi-finals, before the tournament concluded with the final at the San Mamés Stadium in Bilbao on 23 May 2026.

All clubs were ranked in descending order, based firstly on their ranking in their pool, and subsequently on the number of competition points they have accumulated, to create an overall ranking from 1 to 16. The pool winners were ranked 1 to 4, the second-placed clubs were ranked 5 to 8, the third-placed clubs were ranked 9 to 12, and the fourth-placed clubs were ranked 13 to 16.

Whilst the round of 16 followed a pre-determined format, the quarter-finals saw home advantage given to the higher ranked team, based on a pre-determined match-up. As such the teams seeded 1 to 4 were guaranteed home advantage if they reached the quarter-final, and teams seeded 13 to 16 were guaranteed an away fixture if they do so. Whether a team ranked from 5 to 12 would play home or away depended on other results in their section of the bracket.

At the semi-final stage, the higher ranked team had 'home country' advantage, with the match to be played in a suitably-sized stadium in their home union's territory, but not necessarily their own normal home stadium.

Following the pool stages, a record-setting seven English teams made it into the knockout bracket.

=== Seeding ===
Seed	Team	Pts	Diff	TF
Pool leaders
1	(France) Bordeaux Bègles	20	+76	27
2	(Scotland) Glasgow Warriors	20	+49	17
3	(Ireland) Leinster	18	+35	16
4	(England) Bath	16	+91	25
Pool runners-up
5	(England) Northampton Saints	16	+46	23
6	(England) Harlequins	15	+98	23
7	(France) Toulon	14	+17	14
8	(France) Toulouse	11	+94	24
Pool third place
9	(England) Bristol Bears	14	+50	21
10	(South Africa) Stormers	14	–8	15
11	(England) Sale Sharks	11	+32	12
12	(France) Castres	10	–8	13
Pool fourth place
13	(England) Saracens	10	+23	13
14	(Scotland) Edinburgh	10	–71	9
15	(South Africa) Bulls	7	–68	17
16	(England) Leicester Tigers	6	+3	17

=== Bracket ===
Round of 16
1	(France) Bordeaux Bègles	64
16	(England) Leicester Tigers	14
8	(France) Toulouse	59
9	(England) Bristol Bears	26
4	(England) Bath	31
13	(England) Saracens	22
5	(England) Northampton Saints	49
12	(France) Castres	41
2	(Scotland) Glasgow Warriors	25
15	(South Africa) Bulls	21
7	(France) Toulon	28
10	(South Africa) Stormers	27
3	(Ireland) Leinster	49
14	(Scotland) Edinburgh	31
6	(England) Harlequins	17
11	(England) Sale Sharks	26

Quarter-finals
1	(France) Bordeaux Bègles	30
8	(France) Toulouse	15
4	(England) Bath	43
5	(England) Northampton Saints	41
2	(Scotland) Glasgow Warriors	19
7	(France) Toulon	22
3	(Ireland) Leinster	43
11	(England) Sale Sharks	13

Semi-finals
1	(France) Bordeaux Bègles	38
4	(England) Bath	26
3	(Ireland) Leinster	29
7	(France) Toulon	25

Final
1	(France) Bordeaux Bègles	41
3	(Ireland) Leinster	19

=== Round of 16 ===
3 April 2026
20:00

Northampton Saints (England) (5)	49–41	(12) (France) Castres
Try: Penalty try 15'; Fischetti 23' c Kemeny 42' c Freeman 51' c Furbank 58' c McParland 63' c Dingwall 70' c Con: Belleau (6/6) 24', 43', 51', 59', 64', 71'	Report; Highlights	Try: Ambadiang (2) 7' m, 79' c Chabouni 11' c Ardron 52' m Karawalevu 56' c Botitu 67' c Con: Fernandez (1/3) 12'; Hervé (3/3) 56', 67', 80'; Pen: Fernandez (1/1) 22'; Cards: Ambadiang (yellow card) 15'; Ducat (yellow card) 18'; Ramototabua (yellow card) 69'

cinch Stadium at Franklin's Gardens, Northampton
Attendance: 13,595
Referee: Craig Evans (Wales)

4 April 2026
15:00

Bath (England) (4)	31–22	(13) (England) Saracens
Try: Arundell (2) 43' c, 79' m Cokanasiga 49' c Spencer 58' m Lawrence 71' c Con: Russell (3/5) 44', 50', 72'; Cards: Pepper (yellow card) 26'; Obano (yellow card) 45'	Report; Highlights	Try: Bracken 13' c Malins 66' m Caluori 73' c Con: Farrell (1/2) 14'; Burke (1/1) 74'; Pen: Farrell (1/1) 37'; Cards: Wilson (yellow card) 68'

The Rec, Bath
Attendance: 14,509
Referee: Ben Connor (Wales)
(for Nika Amashukeli (Georgia)

Notes:

- Match referee Nika Amashukeli was replaced by Ben Connor during half-time, following an injury sustained in the first half.

4 April 2026
16:00

Toulon (France) (7)	28–27	(10) (South Africa) Stormers
Try: White 8' c Dréan 29' c Ferté 57' c Tuicuvu 65' c Con: Domon (1/1) 9'; Albornoz (3/3) 30', 58', 66'; Cards: Halagahu (yellow card) 72'; Nonu (yellow card) 79'	Report; Highlights	Try: A. Smith 23' c Roos 53' c Khan 77' c Con: Matthee (1/1) 24'; Feinberg-Mngomezulu (2/2) 54', 77'; Pen: Matthee (2/2) 19', 34'

Stade Mayol, Toulon
Attendance: 14,171
Referee: Christophe Ridley (England)

4 April 2026
17:30

Glasgow Warriors (Scotland) (2)	25–21	(15) (South Africa) Bulls
Try: Williamson 17' c Dempsey 33' m Schickerling 56' m McDowall 71' m Con: Lancaster (1/4) 18'; Pen: Hastings (1/1) 80'	Report; Highlights	Try: Grobbelaar 25' m van Staden 76' c Con: Pollard (0/1); Kriel (1/1) 77'; Pen: Pollard (3/3) 12', 31', 39'; Cards: Louw (yellow card) 79'

Scotstoun Stadium, Glasgow
Attendance: 7,321
Referee: Pierre Brousset (France)

4 April 2026
18:30

Toulouse (France) (8)	59–26	(9) (England) Bristol Bears
Try: Willis 8' c Mauvaka (2) 13' c, 19' c Gourgues (2) 15' c, 39' c Lebel (2) 34' m, 40' c Thomas (2) 53' c, 58' c Con: Ramos (7/9) 9', 14', 16', 20', 30', 54', 58'; Cards: Ntamack (yellow card) 47'	Report; Highlights	Try: Harding 4' c Ravouvou 45' m Williams 69' c Heward 74' c Con: Williams (3/4) 5', 69', 75'

Stadium de Toulouse, Toulouse
Attendance: 31,541
Referee: Gianluca Gnecchi (Italy)

4 April 2026
20:00

Harlequins (England) (6)	17–26	(11) (England) Sale Sharks
Try: Cunningham-South 48' m Dombrandt (2) 57' c, 67' m Con: Smith (1/3) 58'; Cards: Evans (yellow card) 32'; Kenningham (yellow card) 54'	Report; Highlights	Try: Cowan-Dickie (2) 33' c, 53' c Con: Ford (2/2) 34', 54'; Pen: Ford (4/5) 20', 25', 30', 42'

Twickenham Stoop, London
Attendance: 7,515
Referee: Luc Ramos (France)

5 April 2026
16:00

Bordeaux Bègles (France) (1)	64–14	(16) (England) Leicester Tigers
Try: Woki 20' c Rayasi (3) 26' m, 67' c, 75' c Lucu 32' c Bielle-Biarrey 34' c Lamothe 38' c Tameifuna 46' c Retière 71' c Con: Lucu (5/6) 21', 33', 35', 39', 47'; Reus (3/3) 68', 72', 76'; Pen: Lucu (1/1) 6'	Report; Highlights	Try: Perese 43' c Searle 56' c Con: Searle (2/2) 43', 57'

Stade Chaban-Delmas, Bordeaux
Attendance: 32,915
Referee: Andrew Brace (Ireland)

5 April 2026
17:30

Leinster (Ireland) (3)	49–31	(14) (Scotland) Edinburgh
Try: T. O'Brien (2) 1' c, 8' c J. O'Brien 24' c Keenan 36' c van der Flier 55' c Clarkson 62' c Ioane 64' c Con: Byrne (7/7) 2', 9', 25', 37', 56', 63', 65'	Report; Highlights	Try: Shiel 15' m Thompson (2) 19' c, 27' c Currie 39' c Graham 51' m Con: Thompson (3/5) 20', 27', 40'

Aviva Stadium, Dublin
Attendance: 21,491
Referee: Luke Pearce (England)

=== Quarter-finals ===
10 April 2026
20:00

Bath (England) (4)	43–41	(5) (England) Northampton Saints
Try: Dunn 9' c Russell 26' c Arundell 33' c van Wyk 39' m Tuipulotu 58' c Hill 76' c Con: Russell (5/6) 10', 27', 34', 58', 77'; Pen: Russell (1/1) 67'; Cards: Reid (yellow card) 2'	Report; Highlights	Try: Pollock 3' c Dingwall 6' c Lockett 16' c Kemeny 22' c Sleightholme 30' c Con: Smith (5/5) 4', 7', 17', 23', 30'; Pen: Smith (2/2) 43', 65'; Cards: van der Mescht (yellow card) 56'; Pollock (yellow card) 72'

The Rec, Bath
Attendance: 14,509
Referee: Andrew Brace (Ireland)

11 April 2026
15:00

Glasgow Warriors (Scotland) (2)	19–22	(7) (France) Toulon
Try: McDowall 9' c Smith 22' m Hiddleston 44' c Con: Lancaster (1/2) 10'; Hastings (1/1) 46'	Report; Highlights	Try: Dréan (2) 13' m, 36' m Gros 28' c Brex 58' m Con: Jaminet (1/4) 29'; Cards: Kpoku (yellow card) 20'

Scotstoun Stadium, Glasgow
Attendance: 7,321
Referee: Karl Dickson (England)

11 April 2026
17:30

Leinster (Ireland) (3)	43–13	(11) (England) Sale Sharks
Try: Sheehan 9' c Keenan 43' m Baird 53' c Ioane 56' c T. O'Brien 62' c Osborne 80' c Con: Byrne (5/6) 10', 54', 57', 63', 80'; Pen: Byrne (1/1) 74'	Report; Highlights	Try: Wills 68' c Con: Ford (1/1) 69'; Pen: Ford (2/2) 34', 46'; Cards: D. du Preez (yellow card) 36'; McIntyre (yellow card) 43'

Aviva Stadium, Dublin
Attendance: 18,839
Referee: Pierre Brousset (France)

12 April 2026
16:00

Bordeaux Bègles (France) (1)	30–15	(8) (France) Toulouse
Try: Lamothe 23' m Jalibert 45' c Tameifuna 57'; Retière 74' m Con: Lucu (2/4) 46', 58'; Pen: Lucu (2/2) 62', 77'	Report; Highlights	Try: Ntamack 25' c Thomas 39' m Con: Ramos (1/2) 26'; Pen: Ramos (1/1) 41'; Cards: Aldegheri (red card) 37'; Dupont (yellow card) 56'

Stade Chaban-Delmas, Bordeaux
Attendance: 32,930
Referee: Matthew Carley (England)

=== Semi-finals ===
2 May 2026
15:00

Leinster (Ireland) (3)	29–25	(7) (France) Toulon
Try: Conan 12’ c van der Flier 32’ c Ringrose 43’ m Doris 66’ c Con: Byrne (3/3) 13’, 32’, 67’ Ringrose (0/1); Pen: Byrne (1/3) 48'; Cards: Porter (yellow card) 35'; Byrne (yellow card) 36'	Report; Highlights	Try: Tuicuvu 36' m Serin 69' c Drean 75' c Con: Jaminet (2/3) 70', 76'; Pen: Jaminet (2/3) 15', 25'; Cards: Baubigny (yellow card) 43'

Aviva Stadium, Dublin
Attendance: 38,555
Referee: Luke Pearce (England)

3 May 2026
16:00

Bordeaux Bègles (France) (1)	38–26	(4) (England) Bath
Try: Gazzotti 2' c Bielle-Biarrey 15' c Lucu 35' c Tameifuna 69' c Matiu 77' c Con: Lucu (5/5) 3', 16', 36', 70', 78'; Pen: Lucu (1/1) 41'	Report; Highlights	Try: Muir (2) 7' c, 27' m Hennessey 51' c Carr-Smith 81' c Con: Russell (3/4) 8', 52', 82'; Cards: Ewels (yellow card) 67'

Stade Atlantique, Bordeaux
Attendance: 42,105
Referee: Nika Amashukeli (Georgia)

=== Final ===
23 May 2026
15:45 CEST (UTC+02)

Bordeaux Bègles (France) (1)	41–19	(3) (Ireland) Leinster
Try: Lucu 13' c Uberti 17' c Bielle-Biarrey (2) 24' c, 35' c Moefana 41' c Con: Lucu (5/5) 14', 18', 25', 36', 42'; Pen: Lucu (2/2) 59', 64'	Report	Try: O'Brien 8' c J. McCarthy 45' m Ringrose 71' c Con: Byrne (1/1) 9'; Frawley (1/2) 71'

San Mamés Stadium, Bilbao
Attendance: 52,327
Referee: Karl Dickson (England)
