= Cahir (surname) =

- Language: English, from Irish

Origin
- Derivation: Ó Cathaoir
- Region of origin: County Clare, Ireland

Cahir is a surname of Irish origin. The original Irish language surname from which it derives is Ó Cathaoir.

Notable people with the surname include:

- Bill Cahir (1968–2009), American journalist and marine
- Gerard Cahir (born 1959), Australian rules footballer
- Jerry Cahir (born 2000), Irish rugby player
