= St Anne's Community College =

Coordinates: 52°48′16″N 8°26′17″W

Saint Anne's Community College
- Coláiste Phobal Naomh Áine
- Killaloe, County Clare; Ireland

Information
- Motto: Beatha agus Dílseacht
- Established: 1987
- Enrollment: 560 (2020)

Saint Anne's Community College is a Multidenominational secondary public school in Killaloe, County Clare, Ireland. Opened as a community school in 1987, it replaced the local all-girl secondary school, which had been founded in 1945 by the Sisters of Mercy.

== Alumni ==
- Jack Brady (b. 1996) - Association footballer
- Maeve Óg O'Leary (b. 2000) - rugby union player
