= Hugo McLaughlin =

Irish rugby union player

- Born: 26 May 2004 (age 22)
- Height: 1.81 m (5 ft 11 in)
- Weight: 90 kg (198 lb)
- School: Gonzaga College
- Notable relative: Luke Mclaughlin

Rugby union career
- Position(s): Winger; Full-back
- Current team: Leinster Rugby
Senior career
Years	Team	Apps	(Points)
2025-	Leinster	2	(0)
International career
Years	Team	Apps	(Points)
2024	Ireland U20		

Hugo McLaughlin (born 26 May 2004) is an Irish rugby union footballer who plays for Leinster Rugby.

== Early life ==
He attended Gonzaga College and won the Leinster Schools Senior Cup in 2023, playing at full-back and scoring a try as his team defeated Blackrock College 35–31.

== Club career ==
Having played for Lansdowne FC, McLaughlin joined the Leinster Rugby Academy ahead of the 2024–25 season. He made his debut in the starting XV for the senior Leinster team against Zebre in the United Rugby Championship on 25 October 2025, playing at full back. He made an immediate impact by setting up Josh Kenny for a try after 70 seconds in a 50–26 win.

== International career ==
McLaughlin was a regular for the Ireland U20 team in the 2024 Six Nations Championship. He went on to play for Ireland U20 at the 2024 World Rugby U20 Championship, as Ireland reached the semi-finals.
