= Niall Smyth =

Irish rugby union player

- Born: Niall Smyth; 9 July 2005 (age 21) New York City, United States
- Height: 1.91 m (6 ft 3 in)
- Weight: 118 kg (18.6 st; 260 lb)
- School: Blackrock College

Rugby union career
- Position: Tight‑head prop
Senior career
Years	Team	Apps	(Points)
2024–	Leinster	1	(0)
- Correct as of 24 January 2026

Niall Smyth (born July 9, 2005) is an Irish rugby union player who operates as a tighthead prop in the Leinster system. A former soccer standout in New York, he transitioned to rugby during his teenage years and was promoted to Leinster’s senior squad in 2025.

== Early life ==
Smyth was born in New York City and grew up playing soccer, even marking Manchester United youth star Kobbie Mainoo in a state‑level match. Moving to Ireland and enrolling at Blackrock College led him to take up rugby.

== Professional career ==
=== Leinster ===
Smyth joined the Leinster Academy ahead of the 2024–25 season. He signed his first senior contract in early 2025. He featured for Leinster 'A' in the Interprovincial Championship but is yet to make his senior debut.

== Playing style ==
At 118 kg and 1.91 m tall, Smyth brings notable physicality to the tighthead position. Former Ireland prop Bernard Jackman described him as “the next Tadhg Furlong”.
