= 2025 IRFU Women's Interprovincial Series =

Irish rugby union competition

2025 Vodafone Women's Interprovincial Championship
- Number of teams: 4 Connacht; Leinster; Munster; Ulster
- Champions: Munster (16th title)
- Runners-up: Leinster
- Matches played: 8
- Tries scored: 65 (average 8.1 per match)

Official website
- www.irishrugby.ie

Location of IRFU Women's Interprovincial Series Provinces:
Republic of Ireland Northern Ireland

The 2025 IRFU Women's Interprovincial Series was contested by women's teams representing the four provincial rugby unions of Ireland, under the same branding and uniforms as the senior men's teams in the United Rugby Championship. The competition used a single round-robin format, similar to the one used in both the Six Nations Championship and the Women's Six Nations Championship. Each team played the other three teams once. (the following year the fixtures are reversed) Unlike the Six Nations, but as in previous seasons of the Interprovincial Series, the competition also featured a playoff final.

The 2025 edition featured a number of debutants as a result of those players in the Irish national squad being at the 2025 Women's Rugby World Cup at the same time as the Series took place. Munster won their sixteenth title, with a 100% record, capped by a 50-15 Series final victory over rivals Leinster. Connacht came third, overcoming Ulster 37-30 in the minor final.

== Regular series ==
=== Round 1 ===
10 August 2025
2:30pm

| (1 BP) Leinster Women (Ireland) | 37–21 | (Ireland) Ulster Women |
| Try: Kathy Baker (2); Emma Brogan (3); Jane Neill; Jade Gaffney; Con: Nikki Caughey (1/7) | Report | Try: Siobhán Sheerin; India Daley; Sophie Barrett; Con: Sheerin (3/3) |

Energia Park
Referee: Cian Aherne (Ireland)

10 August 2025
2:30pm

| (1 BP) Munster Women (Ireland) | 44-5 | (Ireland) Connacht Women |
| Try: Gráinne Burke; Chisom Ugwueru (3); Aoife Corey; Stephanie Nunan; Kate Flannery; Brianna Heylmann; Con: Caitríona Finn (2/8) | Report | Try: Ava Ryder |

Virgin Media Park
Referee: Euan O’Riordan (Ireland)

=== Round 2 ===
16 August 2025
2:30pm

| (1 BP) Leinster Women (Ireland) | 22–33 | (Ireland) Munster Women (1 BP) |
| Try: Vicky Elmes Kinlan; Kathy Baker; Molly Boyne; Katie Whelan; Con: Ellie O'Sullivan Sexton (1/4) | Report | Try: Chloe Pearse (2); Chisom Ugwueru; Kate Flannery; Aoife Corey; Con: Caitríona Finn (4/5) |

Energia Park

16 August 2025
4:30pm

| Connacht Women (Ireland) | 12–7 | (Ireland) Ulster Women (1 BP) |
| Try: Oviawe; Maher; Con: Nic Dhonnacha (1/2) | Report | Try: Sheerin; Con: Sheerin |

Dexcom Stadium, Galway

=== Round 3 ===
23 August 2025
2:30pm

| (1 BP) Connacht Women (Ireland) | 12- 17 | (Ireland) Leinster Women |
| Try: Orla Dixon; Faith Oviawe; Con: Éabha Nic Dhonnacha (1/2) | Report | Try: Kelly Burke; Katie Layde; Vicky Elmes Kinlan; Con: Ellie O’Sullivan Sexton (1/3) |

Dexcom Stadium, Galway
Referee: John Lillis (Ireland)

23 August 2025
4:15 pm

| Ulster Women (Ireland) | 17 - 38 | (Ireland) Munster Women (1 BP) |
| Try: Siobhán Sheerin; Ciara Fitzsimons 2 Con: Siobhán Sheerin (1/3) | Report | Try: Chloe Pearse; Chisom Ugwueru; Caitríona Finn; Maeve Óg O’Leary (2); Alana McInerney; Con: Finn (4/6) |

Affidea Stadium, Belfast
Referee: Dermot Blake (Ireland)

== Table ==
| Pos | Team | Pld | W | D | L | PF | PA | PD | TF | TA | TB | LB | Pts | Qualification or relegation |
|---|---|---|---|---|---|---|---|---|---|---|---|---|---|---|
| 1 | Munster Women (CH) | 3 | 3 | 0 | 0 | 115 | 44 | +71 | 18 | 5 | 3 | 0 | 15 | Qualified for Interprovincial final |
| 2 | Leinster Women (RU) | 3 | 2 | 0 | 1 | 76 | 66 | +10 | 14 | 10 | 2 | 0 | 10 | Qualified for Interprovincial final |
| 3 | Connacht Women | 3 | 1 | 0 | 2 | 27 | 66 | −39 | 5 | 12 | 0 | 1 | 5 | Qualified for third/fourth place final |
| 4 | Ulster Women | 3 | 0 | 0 | 3 | 43 | 87 | −44 | 7 | 15 | 0 | 1 | 1 | Qualified for third/fourth place final |

First match(es) will be played: Unknown. Source: Unknown
Rules for classification: 1) competition points; 2) match points difference; 3) match points for

== Finals day ==
Third/Fourth play-off

30 August 2025
2:30pm

| Ulster Women (Ireland) | 30–37 | (Ireland) Connacht Women |
| Try: Tara O’Neill; Abby Moyles; Sophie Barrett; India Daley; Con: Moyles (2/4); Pen: Moyles (2) | Report | Try: Hannah Clarke (2); Éabha Nic Dhonnacha; Ava Ryder; Grace Browne Moran; Jemima Adams Verling; Con: Nic Dhonnacha (2/6); Pen: Nic Dhonnacha |

Energia Park
Referee: Andrew Cole (Ireland)

Women's Interprovincial Final

30 August 2025
4:30pm

| Leinster Women (Ireland) | 15–50 | (Ireland) Munster Women |
| Try: Katie Whelan (2); Vicky Elmes Kinlan | Report, 2 | Try: Chloe Pearse; Deirbhile Nic a Bháird (2); Aoife Corey; Maeve Óg O’Leary; Caitríona Finn; Eilís Cahill; Con: Finn (6/7); Pen: Finn |

Energia Park
Referee: Daniel Carson (Ireland)

== Provinces ==
| Team | Coach / Director of Rugby | Captain | Stadium | City | Capacity |
|---|---|---|---|---|---|
| Connacht Rugby | Emer O’Dowd | | Dexcom Stadium | Galway | 6,129 (expandable to 8,129) |
| Leinster Rugby | Tania Rosser | | Energia Park | Dublin | 6,000 |
| Munster Rugby | Fiona Hayes | | Virgin Media Park | Cork | 8,008 |
| Ulster Rugby | Murray Houston | | Kingspan Stadium | Belfast | 18,196 (9,000 seated) |
