= Gerard Cahir =

Australian rules footballer

Personal information
- Full name: Gerard Cahir
- Born: 25 August 1959 (age 67)
- Original team: Dunnstown
- Height: 192 cm (6 ft 4 in)
- Weight: 92 kg (203 lb)
- Position: Forward

Playing career^{1}
Years	Club	Games (Goals)
1977, 1979, 1983	St Kilda	11 (2)
- ^{1} Playing statistics correct to the end of 1983.

Gerard Cahir (born 25 August 1959) is a former Australian rules footballer who played with St Kilda in the Victorian Football League (VFL).
