= Andrew Osborne =

Andrew Osborne may refer to:

- Andrew Osborne (rugby union, born 1981)
- Andrew Osborne (rugby union, born 2003)

== See also ==
- Andrew Osborn, Australian rules footballer
- Andrew L. Osborn, American judge
