= Josh Kenny (rugby union) =

Irish rugby union player

- Born: 3 August 2003 (age 23)
- School: Presentation College Bray

Rugby union career
- Position: Winger
- Current team: Leinster
Amateur team(s)
Years	Team	Apps	(Points)
- Greystones RFC
- Terenure College RFC
Senior career
Years	Team	Apps	(Points)
2025-	Leinster	11	(45)
National sevens team
Years	Team		Comps
2024-	Ireland Sevens		

Joshua Kenny is an Irish professional rugby union player who played for Ireland Sevens and now plays for Leinster having joined their academy in 2025/26 season.

== Biography ==
Kenny came through playing rugby union for Greystones RFC and attended Presentation College Bray before joining Terenure College RFC in the All Ireland League.

Kenny trained with the senior Leinster Rugby team ahead of the 2025–26 season. He was named as a replacement for Leinster for their match against Sharks on 11 October 2025 in the United Rugby Championship (URC), making his senior provincial debut in the second half, in a 31–5 victory for his side. He was named for his first start against Zebre in the URC on 25 October 2025, scoring his first try after 70 seconds following work by Hugo McLaughlin before later adding a second in a 50–26 win.

He made his European Rugby Champions Cup debut on 10 January 2026 starting against Stade Rochelais in Dublin and scored two tries in a 25–24 victory, to move to eight in his first six appearances for Leinster.

== National team ==
Kenny made his debut in the SVNS series for the Ireland national rugby sevens team in the 2024 Dubai Sevens, scoring a late try in a 19–12 win over the United States in November 2024. He played throughout the season and was also a try-scorer at the final event at the 2025 USA Sevens.

Kenny was a try-scorer for Irish Wolfhounds against England A in February 2026.
