= Alex Wills =

English Rugby Union player

- Born: 11 February 2004 (age 22) Wordsley, England
- Height: 1.88 m (6 ft 2 in)
- Weight: 99 kg (218 lb; 15 st 8 lb)

Rugby union career
- Position: Wing
- Current team: Sale Sharks
Senior career
Years	Team	Apps	(Points)
2022	Worcester Warriors	1	(5)
2022–	Sale Sharks	28	(30)
- Correct as of 17 January 2026
International career
Years	Team	Apps	(Points)
2022–2023	England under-19	2	(0)
2023–2024	England under-20	12	(10)
- Correct as of 19 July 2024

Alex Wills (born 11 February 2004) is an English professional rugby union player who plays as a wing for Premiership Rugby club Sale Sharks.

== Early life ==
Wills played junior rugby for Worcester and attended Hartpury College.

== Club career ==
Wills made a single Premiership Rugby Cup appearance for Worcester Warriors, scoring a try in a defeat to Gloucester Rugby in September 2022, prior to the club going out of business. In the December of thar yeat he signed a contract with Sale Sharks until the end of the 2025-26 season.

He made his Premiership debut for Sale Sharks during the 2023-24 season against Gloucester. In January 2024 he made his first start in the European Rugby Champions Cup against Stormers.

== International career ==
In April 2023, Wills was capped by England at U19 level. Later that year he made his debut for England U20 against Georgia during a warm-up game for the 2023 World Rugby U20 Championship. Wills scored a try in their semi-final elimination as England ultimately finished fourth.

Wills was a member of the England squad that won the 2024 Six Nations Under 20s Championship and scored his only try of the competition against Wales. Later that year he played at the 2024 World Rugby U20 Championship and started in the final as England defeated France at Cape Town Stadium to win the tournament.

== Honours ==
England U20

- World Rugby Under 20 Championship
  - (gold) Champion (1): 2024
- Six Nations Under 20s Championship
  - (gold) Champion (1): 2024
