= Maeve Óg O'Leary =

Irish rugby union player

- Born: 6 March 2000 (age 26) Ballina, Ireland
- Height: 1.63 m (5 ft 4 in)
- Weight: 70 kg (11 st; 150 lb)
- School: St Anne's Community College
- University: Dublin City University
- Notable relative: Shane O'Leary (brother)

Rugby union career
- Position: Back-row
Amateur team(s)
Years	Team	Apps	(Points)
- Ballina-Killaloe
- Blackrock College
Senior career
Years	Team	Apps	(Points)
2021–	Munster		
International career
Years	Team	Apps	(Points)
2021–	Ireland	4	(0)
- Correct as of 25 March 2023

Maeve Óg O'Leary (born 6 March 2000) is an Irish rugby union player. She plays for Blackrock College in the women's All-Ireland League, Munster in the IRFU Women's Interprovincial Series and Ireland internationally. O'Leary can play across the back-row.

== Early life and education ==
O'Leary was born in Ballina, County Tipperary and attended St Anne's Community College, where she was first introduced to rugby union and, in 2015, helped form the schools first girls rugby team. As well as rugby, O'Leary also played camogie and softball, representing Ireland in the latter at two under-19 world championships and making her senior debut in 2019.

O'Leary also played rugby for her home club Ballina-Killaloe RFC after they formed a girls team in 2015 too, playing first as a centre and fly-half, however, when O'Leary left school to attend Dublin City University and began playing college rugby and club rugby with Blackrock College, she began playing in the back-row. O'Leary studied for a master's degree in public relations and strategic communications whilst at Dublin City University.

== Club career ==
=== Blackrock College ===
O'Leary joined Blackrock College and was part of the team that won the 2022 All-Ireland League Women's Division.

=== Munster ===
O'Leary earned representation at Munster under-18 level for both the 7s and 15s teams, playing for the 7s team in 2017 before making the 15s squad for the 2018 U18 Girls Interprovincial Championship. She made her senior Munster debut in 2021 and was part of the team that won the Interprovincial Championship in 2022 and retained the championship in 2023.

== International career ==
O'Leary made her senior Ireland debut in 2021, featuring as a replacement for then-captain Ciara Griffin in their 20–10 win against the United States. During the 2022 Women's Six Nations Championship, O'Leary was the '24th player' for the opening three rounds providing injury cover, but made her tournament debut in the fourth round against England.
