= Kathy Baker (rugby union) =

Irish rugby union player (born 1998)

- Born: 23 January 1998 (age 28) Kilcloon, County Meath, Ireland
- Height: 1.69 cm (1 in)
- Weight: 68 kg (150 lb)

Rugby union career
- Current team: Blackrock College RFC
National sevens team
Years	Team	Comps
2018-	Ireland	

Kathy Baker (born 23 January 1998) is an Irish rugby union player. She was selected as part of the Ireland national rugby sevens team for the 2024 Paris Olympics.

== Early life ==
She is from County Meath and began playing rugby whilst attending King's Hospital School in Dublin.

== Career ==
She made her SVNS World Series debut at the Kitakyushu Sevens in 2018, at the age of 19 years-old. She was nominated for Irish Women's 7s Player of the Year in October 2020.

As well as playing domestic rugby for Blackrock College RFC, she was selected to play for Ireland at the 2022 Rugby World Cup Sevens.

She played for the Irish sevens team in the SVNS series in 2023, scoring a try in the Sydney semi final in January 2023. and in the Hong Kong Sevens in March 2023. She was part of the Irish team that qualified for the 2024 Olympics with their performance at the World Rugby Seven Series in Australia in May 2023.

She was subsequently selected for the 2024 Paris Olympics after recovering from a long-term knee injury in time for selection.
