= Marius Domon =

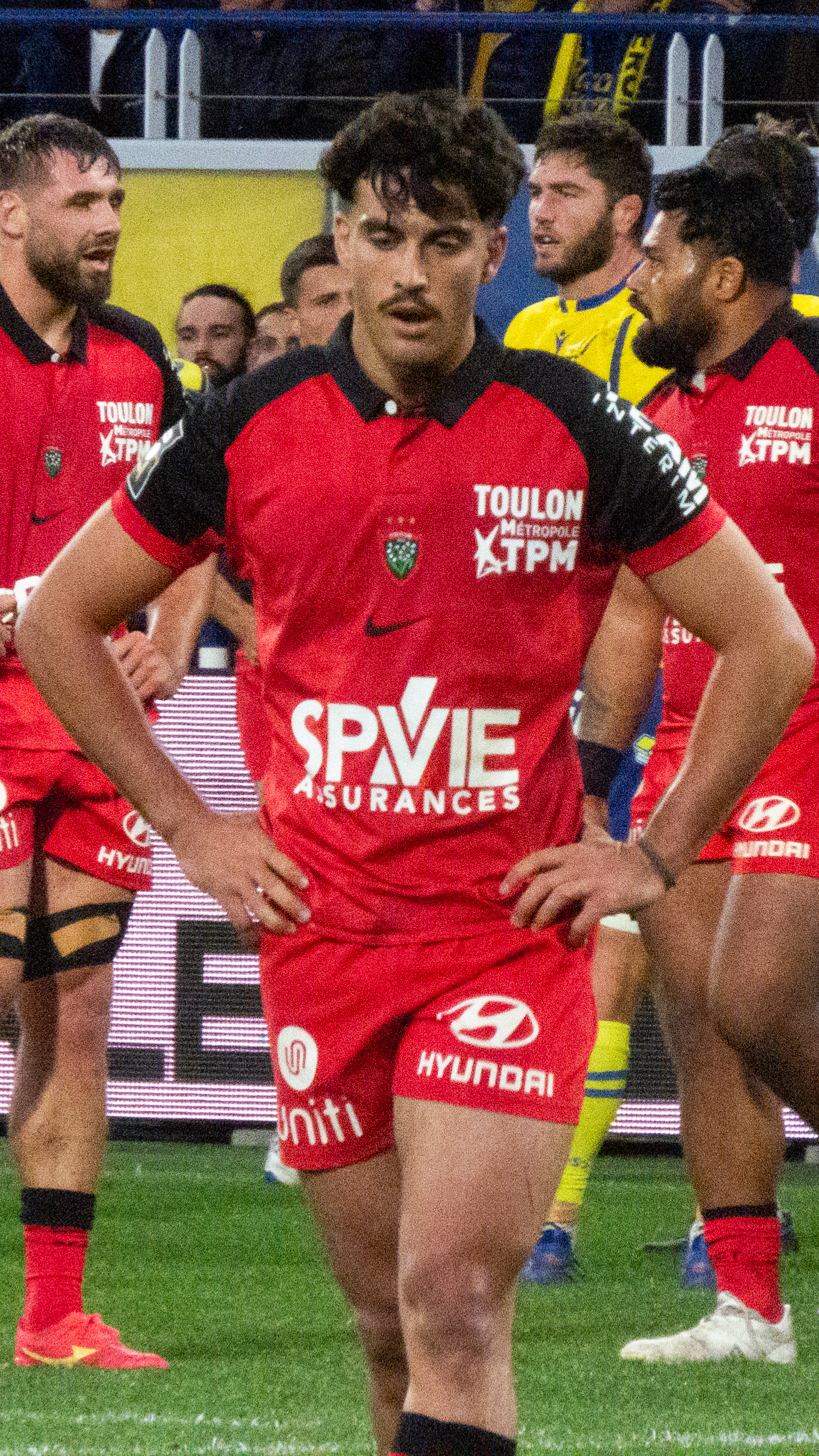
- Domon with Toulon in 2023
- Born: 13 June 2002 (age 24) Nice, France
- Height: 1.83 m (6 ft 0 in)
- Weight: 85 kg (187 lb)

Rugby union career
- Position: Full back
- Current team: Toulon
Senior career
Years	Team	Apps	(Points)
2021–	Toulon	58	(141)
- Correct as of 16:24, 5 April 2026 (UTC)
National sevens team
Years	Team		Comps
2022–2023	France		

Marius Domon (born 13 June 2002) is a French professional rugby union player who plays as a full back for Toulon.

== Early life ==
Domon was born in Nice, and from the age of two he lived on a monohull boat, visiting locations including Africa. In 2006, he and his mother landed in Martinique in the French West Indies for the birth of his brother, while his father remained on the boat. The family then docked at the port of Gustavia on Saint Barthélemy, another French possession, where they settled and the children attended school.

Domon's father was a former rugby player and introduced him to the sport when he was four, signing him up to Barracudas, the only team on Saint-Barthélemy.When Domon was seven, his parents bought a larger catamaran, with solar panels and a wind turbine. The electricity was used for essentials and he only watched television for the European Rugby Champions Cup, adopting RC Toulon as his favourite team.

In 2016, when Domon was 14, his mother qualified as a science teacher in Guadeloupe so that the family could stay in the Caribbean, and they moved into an apartment. He was admitted to a CREPS (Regional Centre for Sports and Physical Education) and a year later he passed a test to move back to Metropolitan France and join Toulon's academy.

== Club career ==
Domon made his debut for Toulon in Top 14 on 20 February 2021, in a 33–29 win away to Pau. On 15 April 2023 he scored his first try, in a 37–15 home win over Perpignan.

On 17 April 2025, having started 18 of his 21 games for the season, Domon signed his first professional contract, lasting until 2028. The following 11 January, in the Champions Cup, he scored a try, two penalties and three conversions for 17 points in a 27–25 home win over Munster; his last penalty decided the game with five minutes remaining. Six days later away to Gloucester in the next game of the competition, he contributed a penalty and four conversions for 11 points in a 31–14 win.

== International career ==
While living on Guadeloupe, Domon won a regional competition with the national team in 2016. He was called up for the France national rugby sevens team in September 2021 for two tournaments in Canada which were cancelled due to the COVID-19 pandemic, and eight months later he was recalled to the team.
