= Lee Barron (rugby union) =

Irish rugby union player

- Born: 15 February 2001 (age 25) Dublin, Ireland
- Height: 1.91 m (6 ft 3 in)
- Weight: 108 kg (238 lb; 17 st 0 lb)
- School: St Michael's

Rugby union career
- Position: Hooker
Senior career
Years	Team	Apps	(Points)
2021–2025	Leinster	24	(15)
2025-	Munster	21	(10)
- Correct as of 31 October 2026
International career
Years	Team	Apps	(Points)
2025-	Ireland A	1	(0)
- Correct as of 8 November 2025

Lee Barron (born 15 February 2001) is an Irish rugby union player, currently playing for United Rugby Championship and European Rugby Champions Cup side Munster. His preferred position is hooker.

He joined Munster on loan on 15 April 2025 ahead of a permanent move to remain with Munster for the following season.

== Leinster ==
Barron was named in the Leinster Rugby academy for the 2021–22 season. He made his debut in Round 16 of the 2021–22 United Rugby Championship against the Sharks.

== Munster ==
He joined Munster on loan along with front row partner Michael Milne on 15 April 2025 ahead of both players permanent move the following season. Barron made his Munster debut in the province's narrow 13–16 loss to South African side, Bulls, in Thomond Park. Barron would play his second game in red on the 9th May 2025, in a 38–20 victory over provincial rivals Ulster.

In the final round of the United Rugby Championship 2024-25 Barron would score his first try for Munster in the side's victory over Italian team Benetton.
