= Seta Tuicuvu =

Fijian rugby union player (born 1995)

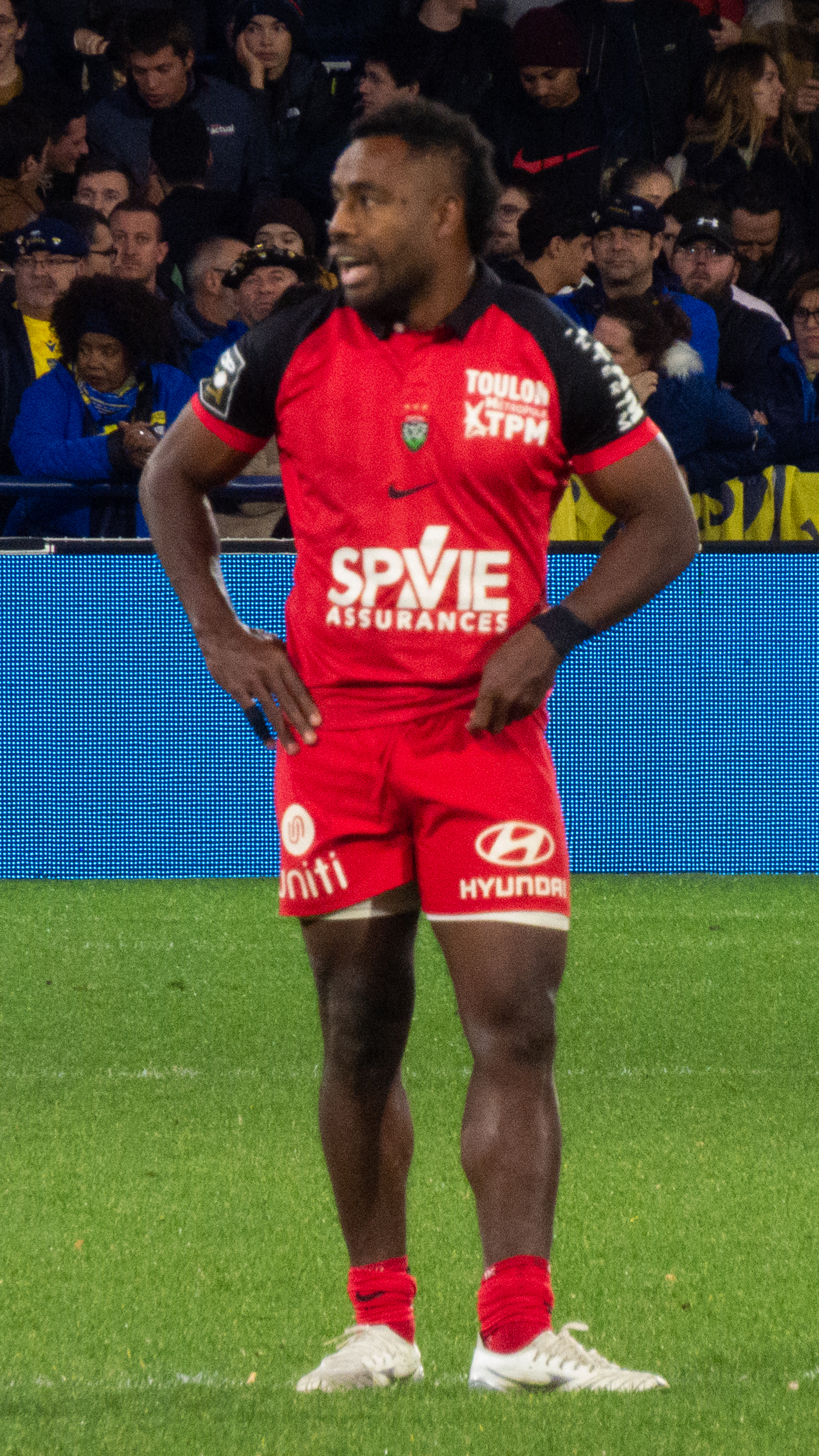
- Full name: Setariki Tuicuvu
- Born: 7 September 1995 (age 31) Fiji
- Height: 179 cm (5 ft 10 in)
- Weight: 90 kg (198 lb; 14 st 2 lb)

Rugby union career
- Position(s): Fullback, Winger
- Current team: Toulon
Senior career
Years	Team	Apps	(Points)
2017–2020	Clermont	28	(25)
2020–2023	Brive	64	(52)
2023–	Toulon	73	(90)
- Correct as of 22 September 2026
International career
Years	Team	Apps	(Points)
2018–	Fiji	13	(18)
- Correct as of 22 September 2026

Seta Tuicuvu (born 7 September 1995 in Fiji) is a Fijian rugby union player who plays for Toulon in the French Top 14. His playing position is fullback.
