= Tommy O'Brien (rugby union) =

Irish rugby union player

- Born: 28 May 1998 (age 28) Dublin, Ireland
- Height: 1.83 m (6 ft 0 in)
- Weight: 92 kg (14.5 st; 203 lb)
- School: Blackrock College
- University: University College Dublin

Rugby union career
- Position(s): Centre, Wing
Amateur team(s)
Years	Team	Apps	(Points)
- UCD
Senior career
Years	Team	Apps	(Points)
2019–	Leinster	54	(90)
- Correct as of 17 January 2026
International career
Years	Team	Apps	(Points)
2017–2018	Ireland U20	15	(30)
2025	Ireland A	1	(0)
2025–	Ireland	10	(50)
- Correct as of 14 November 2026

Tommy O'Brien (born 28 May 1998) is an Irish professional rugby union plays centre or wing for United Rugby Championship club Leinster and Ireland national team.

== Early life ==
O'Brien attended Blackrock College and played in the Leinster Schools Rugby Senior Cup for the school, as well being a Leinster Schools 110-metre hurdles champion.

== Leinster ==
O'Brien made his senior competitive debut for Leinster in their round 8 2019–20 Pro14 interprovincial clash against Ulster on 20 December 2019, with O'Brien starting at 13 for Leinster and playing 70 minutes in their 54–42 win against the northern province.

== Ireland ==
O'Brien represented Ireland under-20s between 2017 and 2018, and captained the side during 2018.

In July 2025, he made his debut for the senior side scoring two tries as Ireland defeated Georgia 34–5 in the first match of the 2025 summer tour. He scored a further two against Portugal a week later.

=== List of international tries ===
Number	Position	Points	Tries	Result	Opposition	Venue	Date
1-2	Wing	10	2	Won	Georgia		5 July 2025
3-4	Wing	10	2	Won	Portugal		12 July 2025
5	Wing	5	1	Won	Japan		8 November 2025
6	Wing	5	1	Won	England	Twickenham Stadium	21 February 2026
7-8	Wing	10	2	Won	Scotland	Aviva Stadium	14 March 2026

as of 14 March 2026

== Honours ==
=== Team ===
Leinster

- United Rugby Championship: Winner (2025, 2026)

Ireland

- Six Nations Triple Crown: Winner (2026)
