= Jimmy O'Brien (rugby union) =

Irish rugby union player

- Born: 27 November 1996 (age 29) Eadestown, Ireland
- Height: 1.83 m (6 ft 0 in)
- Weight: 90 kg (198 lb; 14 st 2 lb)
- School: Newbridge College
- University: University College Dublin

Rugby union career
- Position(s): Fullback, Wing
- Current team: Leinster
Senior career
Years	Team	Apps	(Points)
2018–	Leinster	116	(149)
- Correct as of 18 July 2026
International career
Years	Team	Apps	(Points)
2016	Ireland U20	8	(0)
2022–	Ireland	16	(5)
- Correct as of 13 July 2026
National sevens team
Years	Team		Comps
2017–2018	Ireland		7
- Correct as of 19 December 2020

Jimmy O'Brien (born 27 November 1996) is an Irish professional rugby union player who plays as a fullback for United Rugby Championship club Leinster and the Ireland national team.

== Early life ==
O'Brien was born in Eadestown in County Kildare, Ireland. He played in his school rugby with Newbridge College. Although he played fly-half at school, he moved to inside centre with the Leinster academy. His strengths in attack include a good kicking game, footwork, and passing, while in defence despite his lack of size he has a physical approach.

== International career ==
With the Irish sevens team he generally played at centre, but also filled in at fly-half. O'Brien played for Ireland at the 2018 Hong Kong Sevens qualifier, scoring four tries, but Ireland lost to Japan 7–12 in the semifinal and consequently failed to qualify as a core team for the 2018-19 World Series. O'Brien played for Ireland on the London and Paris legs of the 2017-18 World Rugby Sevens Series; in those tournaments, despite its non-core status, Ireland surprised by finishing third and seventh respectively, with O'Brien scoring four tries across the two tournaments.

In February 2022 O'Brien was called up to the Ireland squad for the 2022 Six Nations Championship. In June 2022, he was included in the Ireland squad for the 2022 tour of New Zealand.

On 4 November 2022, he was called up as a late bench replacement to the named squad to face South Africa in the first test of the Autumn Series, following an injury to Robbie Henshaw whose starting place was taken by replacement Stuart McCloskey. Following an injury to McCloskey in the first half, O'Brien made his test debut, playing 53 minutes in an Ireland victory.
