= Jerry Cahir =

Irish rugby union player (born 2000)

- Born: 26 August 2000 (age 26) Roscrea, Ireland
- Height: 188 cm (6 ft 2 in)
- Weight: 118 kg (260 lb)
- School: Cistercian College, Roscrea

Rugby union career
- Position: Prop
- Current team: Leinster
Senior career
Years	Team	Apps	(Points)
2021-2022	Old Belvedere		
2022-2024	Dublin University FC		
2024-2025	Lansdowne		
2025–2026	Leinster	15	(5)
- Correct as of 20 May 2026

Jerry Cahir (born 26 August 2000) is an Irish professional rugby union footballer who plays for Leinster Rugby. His preferred position is prop.

== Career ==
Cahir played rugby whilst attending Cistercian College, Roscrea, before playing for Old Belvedere. He was named the Dublin University FC 'Player of the Year' in 2024. He went on to play for Lansdowne in Division 1A of the All-Ireland League, and was also named 'Player of the Year' for their 2024–25 season. He featured for Leinster ‘A’ in 2024–25, and helped the province to win the IRFU 150 ‘A’ Men's Interprovincial Championship title.

Following these performances, Cahir signed a short-term contract with Leinster Rugby in September 2025. He was named for his first start and debut against Zebre in the United Rugby Championship on 25 October 2025, in a 50–26 win. In January 2026, Cahir made his debut in the European Rugby Champions Cup against Stade Rochelais, appearing as an injury replacement for Paddy McCarthy in a 25–24 victory. He will join Connacht Rugby for the 2026/2027 season.
