= Harry Byrne =

Irish rugby union player

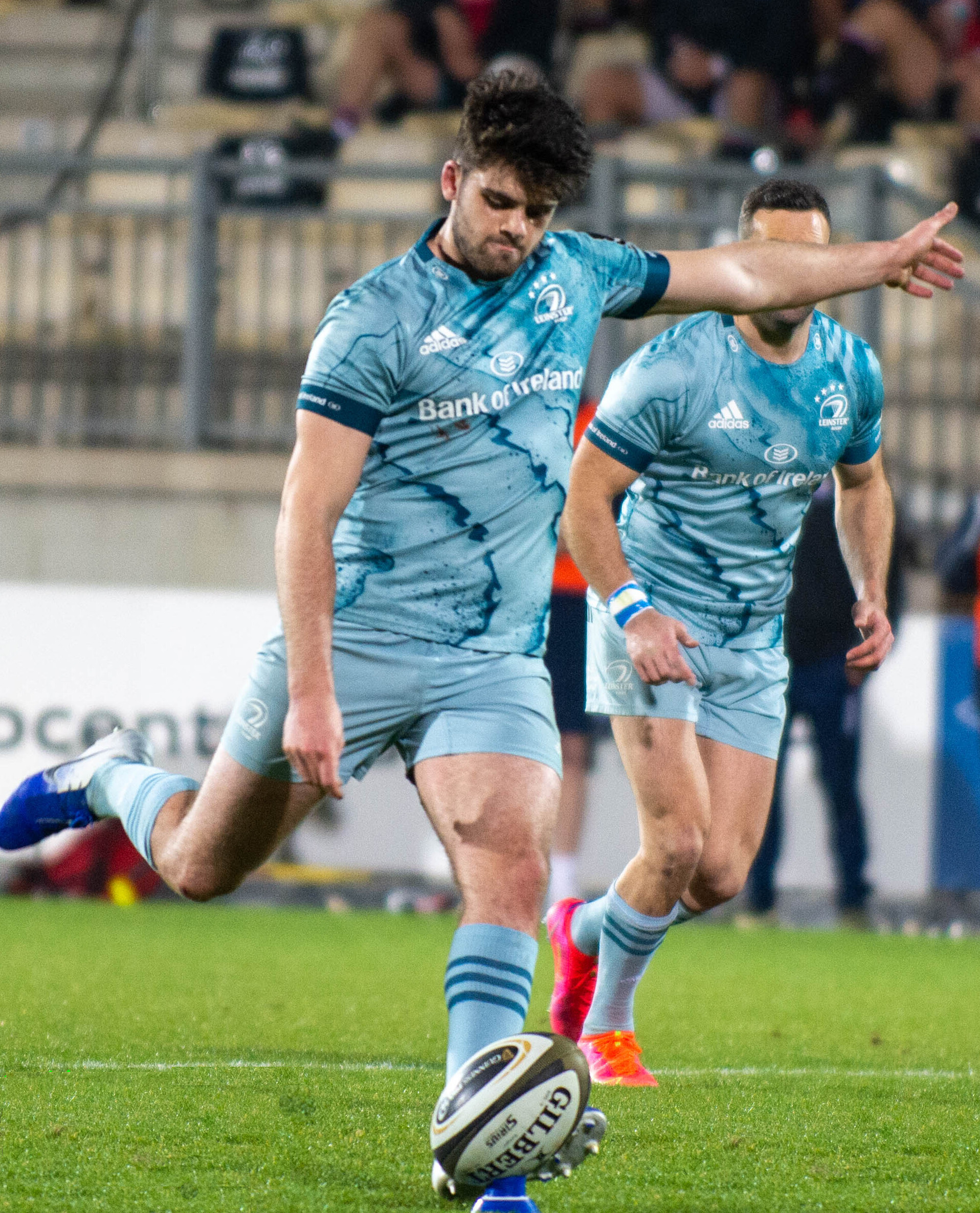
- Byrne in 2021
- Born: 22 April 1999 (age 27) Dublin, Ireland
- Height: 1.90 m (6 ft 3 in)
- Weight: 91.82 kg (202.4 lb; 14 st 6.4 lb)
- School: St Michael's College
- Notable relative: Ross Byrne (brother)

Rugby union career
- Position: Fly-half
Amateur team(s)
Years	Team	Apps	(Points)
- Lansdowne
Senior career
Years	Team	Apps	(Points)
2019–	Leinster	84	(389)
2024–2025	→ Bristol Bears (loan)	11	(67)
- Correct as of 28 February 2026
International career
Years	Team	Apps	(Points)
2018–2019	Ireland U20s	13	(122)
2021–	Ireland	5	(13)
2025-	Ireland A	2	(16)
- Correct as of 11 July 2026

Harry Byrne (born 22 April 1999) is an Irish rugby union player who plays for URC club Leinster. He plays as a fly-half and represents Lansdowne in the All-Ireland League.

== Club career ==
=== Leinster ===
Whilst still in Leinster's academy, Byrne was selected in the province's pre-season squad, and he went on to score 17 points in their 47–17 win against Coventry, as well as featuring in the 38–35 win against Canada. Following his pre-season performances, Byrne was selected on the bench for Leinster's opening 2019–20 Pro14 fixture away to Italian side Benetton on 28 September 2019, and he replaced older brother Ross in the 69th minute, scoring a late penalty to secure a 32–27 win for Leinster. In April 2026, Leinster announced that Byrne had signed a contract extension to stay at the province.

==== Loan to Bristol Bears ====
In December 2024, he joined Bristol Bears in the Premiership on a three-month loan deal to provide injury cover for AJ MacGinty. In January 2025, he made his debut off the bench in the Premiership converting two tries but losing 35–26 to Saracens. In March 2025, his loan was extended to the end of the season.

== International career ==
In June 2021, he was called up to the senior Ireland squad for the Summer tests. Byrne scored six points in his debut off the bench for the Ireland senior side, in a 71–10 victory over the United States on 10 July 2021.
