= 2025–26 Celtic Challenge =

Women's rugby union competition in Europe

- Countries: Ireland; Wales; Scotland
- Number of teams: 6
- Champions: (Ireland) Wolfhounds (3rd title)
- Runners-up: (Ireland) Clovers
- Matches played: 32

Official website
- celticrugbycomp.com

The 2025–26 Celtic Challenge was the fourth season of the Celtic Challenge, a cross-border women's rugby union competition with teams from Ireland, Wales, and Scotland. The six team tournament features a full double round robin fixture series, with each team playing the others both home and away. For the first time, however, the competition will include a single elimination play-off with semi-finals and a grand final to be held in Edinburgh.

Wolfhounds entered the competition as two–time defending champions, and successfully defended their title, beating fellow Irish side Clovers 50–29 in the competitions first grand final.

== Teams and locations ==
There have been no team changes from the 2024–25 season.

Team	Country	Coach / Director of Rugby	Affiliation
Brython Thunder	Wales	Ashley Beck	Scarlets, Ospreys
Clovers	Ireland	Denis Fogarty	Munster, Connacht
Edinburgh Rugby	Scotland	Claire Cruikshank	Edinburgh Rugby
Glasgow Warriors	Scotland	Lindsey Smith	Glasgow Warriors
Gwalia Lightning	Wales	Catrina Nicholas-McLaughlin	Cardiff. Dragons RFC
Wolfhounds	Ireland	Neill Alcorn	Leinster, Ulster

== Table ==
Pos	Team	Pld	W	D	L	PF	PA	PD	TF	TA	TB	LB	Pts	Qualification
1	(Ireland) Wolfhounds (Q)	10	9	0	1	431	127	+304	66	20	9	0	45	Play-offs
2	(Ireland) Clovers (Q)	10	8	0	2	294	231	+63	48	37	7	0	39	Play-offs
3	(Wales) Gwalia Lightning (Q)	10	4	0	6	217	212	+5	34	35	5	4	25	Play-offs
4	(Wales) Brython Thunder (Q)	10	5	0	5	150	218	−68	24	35	2	1	23	Play-offs
5	(Scotland) Glasgow Warriors	10	2	0	8	154	236	−82	32	49	6	3	17	
6	(Scotland) Edinburgh Rugby	10	2	0	8	152	321	−169	19	37	3	1	12	

First match(es) will be played: 20 December 2025. Source: Celtic Challenge
Rules for classification: Four points for a win, two points for a draw. One bonus point for scoring four or more tries in a match; one bonus point for losing by a margin of seven or less.

== Match grid ==
The following are the fixtures and results for the 2025–26 Celtic Challenge regular season:

Home \ Away		BRY	CLO	EDI	GLA	GWA	WOL
(Wales)	Brython Thunder	—	12–15	33–14	17–36	7–0	14–0
(Ireland)	Clovers	29–12	—	31–7	57–31	35–31	7-24
(Scotland)	Edinburgh Rugby	7–14	26–43	—	31–25	7-43	12–50
(Scotland)	Glasgow Warriors	10–32	31–38	17–24	—	19–31	26–42
(Wales)	Gwalia Lightning	38–7	14–19	31–17	12–15	—	7-52
(Ireland)	Wolfhounds	69–0	43–20	34–7	52–26	44–10	—

Colours: Green: home team win; Yellow: draw; Red: away team win; Blue: upcoming matches

== Regular season ==
The fixtures were announced in October 2025. The first round of fixtures will take place on 20 December 2025. All times shown are local times.

=== Round 1 ===
20 December 2025
11:30

(1 BP) Clovers (Ireland)	35–31	(Wales) Gwalia Lightning (2 BP)
Try: Sadhbh McGrath (2); Niamh Murphy; Jemima Adams Verling; Aoibheann McGrath; Con: Caitríona Finn (5); Cards: Caoimhe Murphy (yellow card) 79'	Report	Try: Evie Hill; Courtney Greenway; Maisie Davies (2); Tilly Vucaj; Con: Carys Hughes (3)

Donnybrook Stadium, Dublin
Referee: Dermot Blake

20 December 2025
12:30

Brython Thunder (Wales)	17–36	(Scotland) Glasgow Warriors (1 BP)
Try: Ellie Tromans; Hanna Marshall; Jess Rogers; Con: Marshall	Report	Try: Sky Phimister (2); Hannah Smyth (2); Poppy Mellanby; Holland Bogan; Con: Rianna Darroch (3)

Parc y Scarlets, Llanelli

20 December 2025
14:30

(1 BP) Wolfhounds (Ireland)	34–7	(Scotland) Edinburgh Rugby
Try: Sophie Barrett (2); India Daley; Maggie Boylan; Eve Higgins; Linda Djougang; Con: Dannah O’Brien (2)	Report	Try: Cat Moody; Con: Lucy MacRae; Cards: Scarlett Haddow (yellow card) 59'

Donnybrook Stadium, Dublin
Referee: Padraic Reidy

=== Round 2 ===
27 December 2025
12:00

(1 BP) Edinburgh Rugby (Scotland)	31–25	(Scotland) Glasgow Warriors (2 BP)
Try: Aila Ronald; Molly Poolman; Hannah Walker; Cieron Bell; Nicole Marlow; Con: Hannah Ramsay (3)	Report	Try: Beth Blacklock; Hannah Smyth; Sky Phimister; Holland Bogan (2)

Edinburgh Rugby Stadium, Edinburgh

27 December 2025
14:00

(1 BP) Gwalia Lightning (Wales)	38–7	(Wales) Brython Thunder
Try: Webster (2); Pyrs; Fajeyisan; Reardon; King; Con: Hughes (4/6)	Report	Try: Healen; Con: Williams

Cardiff Arms Park, Cardiff
Attendance: 650
Referee: Amber Stamp

3 January 2026
15:00

Clovers (Ireland)	7–24	(Ireland) Wolfhounds (1 BP)
Try: Jemima Adams Verling 40+2' c Con: Caitríona Finn 40+3'	Report	Try: Aoife Dalton 6' c Robyn O’Connor 37' m Maggie Boylan 64' m Eve Higgins 69' c Con: Dannah O'Brien (2) 7', 70'

Creggs RFC
Referee: Shane Tuohy

=== Round 3 ===
10 January 2025
12:30

Glasgow Warriors (Scotland)	19–31	(Wales) Gwalia Lightning (1 BP)
Try: Sky Phimister 13' m Freya Walker 45' c Gemma Bell 55' c Con: Kate Ainsworth (2) 46', 56'	Report	Try: Tilly Vucaj 29' c Molly Reardon 51' m Courtney Greenway (3) 58' c, 68' m, 76' c Con: Carys Hughes 30', 59', 77'

Scotstoun Stadium, Glasgow

10 January 2026
15:00

Edinburgh Rugby (Scotland)	12–50	(Ireland) Wolfhounds (1 BP)
Try: Cieron Bell; Talei Tawake; Con: Nicole Marlow	Report	Try: Erin King; India Daley; Aoibheann Reilly; Aoife Dalton; Niamh Marley; Maggie Boylan; Aoife Corcoran; Stacey Flood; Con: Dannah O’Brien (4); Abby Moyles

Edinburgh Rugby Stadium, Edinburgh

11 January 2026
12:00

(1 BP) Brython Thunder (Wales)	12–15	(Ireland) Clovers
Try: Amy Williams; Gwen Crabb; Con: Hanna Marshall	Report	Try: Emily Foley; Lucia Linn; Con: Caitríona Finn; Pen: Caitríona Finn

Cardiff Arms Park, Cardiff

=== Round 4 ===
17 January 2026
13:00

(1 BP) Gwalia Lightning (Wales)	31–17	(Scotland) Edinburgh Rugby
Try: Greenway; Lewis; Pyrs; Reardon; Hawkins; Con: Hughes (2); Hesketh	Report	Try: Bell; Ronald; Ramsay; Con: MacRae

CSE, Ystrad Mynach

18 January 2026
12:00

(1 BP) Wolfhounds (Ireland)	69–0	(Wales) Brython Thunder
Try: Niamh Marley penalty try Vicky Elmes Kinlan (2); Robyn O’Connor (2); Linda Djougang; Stacey Flood; Maebh Clenaghan; Jade Gaffney; Naoise Smyth; Con: Dannah O’Brien (3); Flood (2)		Cards: Lisa Neumann (yellow card)

Ravenhill Stadium, Belfast
Referee: Rob McGreer (Ireland)

18 January 2026
15:00

(1 BP) Clovers (Ireland)	57–31	(Scotland) Glasgow Warriors (1 BP)
Try: Alana McInerney (2); Caitríona Finn; Anna McGann; Sadhbh McGrath; Niamh Murphy; Katie Whelan; Aoibheann McGrath; Aoife Corey; Con: Caitríona Finn (6)	Report	Try: Briar McNamara; Nicole Flynn (2); Emily Coubrough; Holland Bogan; Con: Ceitidh Ainsworth (3); Cards: Nicole Flynn (yellow card)

Ravenhill Stadium, Belfast

=== Round 5 ===
24 January 2026
13:00

Edinburgh Rugby (Scotland)	7–43	(Wales) Gwalia Lightning (1 BP)
Try: penalty try	Report	Try: Maisie Davies (2); Lily Terry (2); Bryonie King; Sian Jones; Catherine Richards; Con: Carys Hughes (4/7); Cards: Anwen Owen (yellow card) 31'

Edinburgh Rugby Stadium, Edinburgh

25 January 2026
12:00

(1 BP) Clovers (Ireland)	29–12	(Wales) Brython Thunder
Try: Siobhán McCarthy; Annakate Cournane; Emily Lane; Niamh Murphy; Aoife Corey; Con: Caitríona Finn 2	Report	Try: Jess Rogers; Rhian Bowden; Con: Ffion Williams; Cards: Hannah Bluck (yellow card) 15'

Musgrave Park, Cork
Referee: Paudie Sheehan (IRFU)

25 January 2026
15:00

(1 BP) Wolfhounds (Ireland)	52–26	(Scotland) Glasgow Warriors (1 BP)
Try: Caoimhe Molloy (2); Erin King; Katie Corrigan; Linda Djougang; Fiona Tuite; Maeve Óg O’Leary; Vicky Elmes Kinlan; Con: Abby Moyles (6/8); Cards: Fiona Tuite (yellow card) 61'	Report	Try: Holland Bogan; Rianna Darroch; Briar McNamara; Sky Phimister; Con: Millie Warren (3/4)

Musgrave Park, Cork
Referee: Kevin Coffey (IRFU)

=== Round 6 ===
31 January 2026
14:00

(2 BP) Glasgow Warriors (Scotland)	31–38	(Ireland) Clovers (1 BP)
Try: Emily Coubrough; Holland Bogan; Millie Warren; Penalty try Briar McNamara; Con: Millie Warren; Briar McNamara	Report	Try: Faith Oviawe; Aoibheann McGrath (2); Katie Whelan; Anna McGann; Síofra Hession; Con: Caitríona Finn (3); Síofra Hession; Cards: Chisom Ugwueru (yellow card) 68'; Faith Oviawe (yellow card) 71'

Scotstoun Stadium, Glasgow
Referee: Ciaran Stark (SRU)

31 January 2026
15:00

(1 BP) Edinburgh Rugby (Scotland)	7–14	(Wales) Brython Thunder
Try: Hannah Walker; Con: Hannah Walker; Cards: Charlotte Russell (yellow card)	Report	Try: Stella Orrin; Seren Singleton; Con: Ffion Williams (2)

Edinburgh Rugby Stadium, Edinburgh

1 February 2026
12:30

(1 BP) Wolfhounds (Ireland)	44–10	(Wales) Gwalia Lightning
Try: Maggie Boylan; Eve Higgins; Vicky Elmes Kinlan; India Daley; Fiona Tuite; Aoibheann Reilly; Maebh Clenaghan (2); Con: Dannah O’Brien; Abby Moyles; Cards: Fiona Tuite (yellow card)	Report	Try: Chloe Thomas-Bradley; Con: Jodi Palmer; Pen: Carys Hughes

Musgrave Park, Cork
Referee: Tomás O’Sullivan (Ireland)

=== Round 7 ===
14 February 2026
12:30

(1 BP) Brython Thunder (Wales)	33–14	(Scotland) Edinburgh
Try: Rhian Bowden; Seren Lockwood (2) penalty try Seren Singleton; Con: Ffion Williams 3	[ Report]	Try: Nicole Marlow; Adelle Ferrie; Con: Hannah Ramsay; MacRae; Cards: Ramsey (yellow card)

Parc y Scarlets, Llanelli

14 February 2026
13:00

(1 BP) Gwalia Lightning (Wales)	14–19	(Ireland) Clovers
Try: Courtney Greenway; Evie Hill; Con: Carys Hughes 2	Report	Try: Aoife Corey; Alana McInerney; Niamh Murphy; Con: Siofra Hession 2

CSE, Ystrad Mynach

15 February 2026
14:00

Glasgow Warriors (Scotland)	26–42	(Ireland) Wolfhounds
Try: Briar McNamara; Aicha Sutcliffe; Emily Coubrough; Millie Warren; Con: Millie Warren 3		Try: Katie Corrigan; Erin King (2); Naoise Smyth; Fiona Tuite; Aoibheann Reilly; Con: Abby Myles 6 Cards: India Daley (yellow card)

Scotstoun Stadium, Glasgow
Referee: Murray Oliver

=== Round 8 ===
21 February 2026
12:30

Brython Thunder (Wales)	14–0	(Ireland) Wolfhounds
Try: Williams; Picton-Powell; Con: Marshall (2)	Report

Parc y Scarlets, Llanelli

21 February 2026
12:30

(1 BP) Clovers (Ireland)	31–7	(Scotland) Edinburgh Rugby
Try: Aoife Corey; Jemima Adams Verling; Chisom Ugwueru (2); Beth Buttimer; Con: (3/5)	Report	Try: Hannah McMahon; Con: (1/1)

The Sportsground, Galway

21 February 2026
13:00

(1 BP) Gwalia Lightning (Wales)	12–15	(Scotland) Glasgow Warriors
Try: Thomas-Bradley; Pearce; Con: Hughes	Report	Try: Sutcliffe; Norval; Con: Warren; Pen: Warren

CSE, Ystrad Mynach

=== Round 9 ===
28 February 2026
13:00

Glasgow Warriors (Scotland)	10–32	(Wales) Brython Thunder (1 BP)
Try: Hannah Smyth; Con: Millie Warren; Pen: Warren		Try: Lisa Neumann; Seren Singleton; Hanna Marshall; Mabli Evans; Seren Lockwood; Ellie Tromans; Con: (1/6)

Scotstoun Stadium, Glasgow

28 February 2026
13:00

Gwalia Lightning (Wales)	7–52	(Ireland) Wolfhounds (1 BP)
Try: Bethan Lewis; Con: Hughes		Try: Erin King; Katie Corrigan (2); Linda Djougang; Eve Higgins; India Daley; Amy Larn; Stacey Flood . Con: Dannah O'Brien (6/8)

CSE, Ystrad Mynach

28 February 2026
13:00

(1 BP) Edinburgh Rugby (Scotland)	26–43	(Ireland) Clovers (1 BP)
Try: Cat Moody; Bethan Mathieson; Scarlott Haddow; Adelle Ferrie; Con: (3/4)		Try: Beibhinn Parsons; Beth Buttimer (2); Ruth Campbell; Eilis Cahill; Anna McGann; Aoibheann McGrath; Con: (4/7)

Edinburgh Rugby Stadium, Edinburgh

=== Round 10 ===
6 March 2026
19:30

(1 BP) Glasgow Warriors (Scotland)	17–22	(Scotland) Edinburgh Rugby (1 BP)
Try: Sophie Murphy; Millie Warren; Con: Warren (2/2); Pen: Warren	Report	Try: Hannah Walker; Bethan Mathieson; Cat Moody; Kaylee Fraser; Con: Moody (1/4)

Scotstoun Stadium, Glasgow

7 March 2026
15:00

(1 BP) Wolfhounds (Ireland)	43–20	(Ireland) Clovers (1 BP)
Try: Grace Moore; India Daley (2); Niamh Marley; Erin King (2); Robyn O'Connor; Con: Dannah O'Brien (4/7); Cards: Maebh Clenaghan (red card)	Report	Try: Beibhinn Parsons; Anna McGann (2); Katie Whelan

UCD Bowl, Dublin

8 March 2026
14:00

Brython Thunder (Wales)	7–0	(Wales) Gwalia Lightning (1 BP)
Try: Branwen Metcalfe; Con: Marshall; Cards: 2 (yellow card)	Report

Parc y Scarlets, Llanelli

== Play-offs ==
For the first time, the Celtic Challenge will have play-offs to crown a champion, with the top four teams in the regular season advancing to semi-finals, followed by a grand final. With their 52–7 victory of third-placed Gwalia Lightning in round 9, Wolfhounds ensured that both Irish franchises would have a home nation semi-final; both matches were fixed for the Dexcom Stadium, Galway, while the final will take place in a preselected venue, Edinburgh's Hive Stadium.

On 21 March both Irish franchises defeated their Welsh semi-final opposition to set up an all-Ireland final for 28 March, guaranteeing a fourth consecutive Irish champion of the Challenge. On 28 March, Wolfhounds won their third title, defeating Clovers 50 - 29.

Semi-finals
21 March 2026 – Galway
(Ireland) Wolfhounds	36
(Wales) Brython Thunder	10
21 March 2026 – Galway
(Ireland) Clovers	35
(Wales) Gwalia Lightning	20

Final
28 March 2026 – Edinburgh Rugby Stadium, Edinburgh
(Ireland) Wolfhounds	50
(Ireland) Clovers	29

=== Semi-finals ===
21 March 2026
14:30

Wolfhounds (Ireland)	36–10	(Wales) Brython Thunder
Try: Naoise Smyth; Stacey Flood (2); Niamh Higgins; Vicky Elmes Kinlan; Robyn O'Connor; Con: Dannah O'Brien (3)	Report	Try: Branwen Metcalfe; Jorja Aiono

Dexcom Stadium, Galway
Referee: John Lillis (IRFU)

21 March 2026
12:00

Clovers (Ireland)	35–20	(Wales) Gwalia Lightning
Try: Beth Buttimer; Béibhinn Parsons; Alana McInerney (2); Ruth Campbell; Con: Enya Breen (5)	Report, 2	Try: Alaw Pyrs (2); Caitlin Lewis; Con: Carys Hughes; Pen: Hughes

Dexcom Stadium, Galway
Referee: Paul O’Connor (IRFU)

=== Final ===
28 March 2026
15:00

Wolfhounds (Ireland)	50 - 29	(Ireland) Clovers
Try: Vicky Elmes Kinlan (2); Linda Djougang (2); Erin King (2); Maeve Óg O’Leary; Caoimhe Molloy; Con: Dannah O’Brien (4); Abby Moyles	Report	Try: Niamh Murphy; Eilís Cahill (2); Béibhinn Parsons (2); Con: Enya Breen (2); Cards: Ailish Quinn (yellow card)

Edinburgh Rugby Stadium, Edinburgh
Referee: Jonny Mackenzie (SRU)

== Try scorers ==
The top try scorers in the competition were as follows:

Player	Team	Tries
Erin King	(Ireland) Wolfhounds	9

== Discipline ==
Red cards

Player/Coach	Match (Note: The club of the cited player or coach is listed in bold italics)	Law breached	Result	Ref
(Wales) Elan Jones	Wolfhounds vs. Brython Thunder (18 January 2026)	9.13 – tackle above the line of the shoulder (Red card)	3 matches	
(Ireland) Maebh Clenaghan	Wolfhounds vs. Clovers (7 March 2026)	9.12 – A player must not physically or verbally abuse anyone (Red card)	3 matches	
