= 2025 Women's Six Nations Championship squads =

List of rugby tournament teams

The 2025 Women's Six Nations Championship will be the 24th edition of the Women's Six Nations Championship, an annual rugby union competition contested by the national teams of England, France, Ireland, Italy, Scotland and Wales. England are the defending champions, having won their 20th title in 2024.

Note: Number of caps are indicated as of the first match of the tournament (22 March 2025).

== England ==
John Mitchell announced a 37 player squad on 17 March.

Head coach: (New Zealand) John Mitchell

Player	Position	Date of birth (age)	Caps	Club/province
Lark Atkin-Davies	Hooker	3 March 1995 (aged 30)	62	(England) Bristol Bears
May Campbell	Hooker	16 May 1996 (aged 28)	1	(England) Saracens
Amy Cokayne	Hooker	11 July 1996 (aged 28)	79	(England) Leicester Tigers
Hannah Botterman	Prop	8 June 1999 (aged 25)	51	(England) Bristol Bears
Sarah Bern	Prop	10 July 1997 (aged 27)	66	(England) Bristol Bears
Mackenzie Carson	Prop	24 June 1998 (aged 26)	21	(England) Gloucester-Hartpury
Kelsey Clifford	Prop	11 December 2001 (aged 23)	9	(England) Saracens
Maud Muir	Prop	12 July 2001 (aged 23)	35	(England) Gloucester-Hartpury
Zoe Aldcroft (c)	Second row	19 November 1996 (aged 28)	58	(England) Gloucester-Hartpury
Charlotte Fray	Second row	26 May 2000 (aged 24)	0	(England) Leicester Tigers
Rosie Galligan	Second row	30 April 1998 (aged 26)	19	(England) Saracens
Lilli Ives Campion	Second row	10 October 2003 (aged 21)	1	(England) Loughborough Lightning
Morwenna Talling	Second row	5 August 2002 (aged 22)	18	(England) Sale Sharks
Abbie Ward	Second row	27 March 1993 (aged 31)	69	(England) Bristol Bears
Sarah Beckett	Back row	14 February 1999 (aged 26)	35	(England) Gloucester-Hartpury
Georgia Brock	Back row	19 April 2001 (aged 23)	2	(England) Gloucester-Hartpury
Abi Burton	Back row	9 March 2000 (aged 25)	0	(England) Trailfinders
Maddie Feaunati	Back row	18 May 2002 (aged 22)	10	(England) Exeter Chiefs
Sadia Kabeya	Back row	22 February 2002 (aged 23)	18	(England) Loughborough Lightning
Alex Matthews	Back row	3 August 1993 (aged 31)	72	(England) Gloucester-Hartpury
Marlie Packer	Back row	2 October 1989 (aged 35)	108	(England) Saracens
Natasha Hunt	Scrum-half	21 March 1989 (aged 36)	76	(England) Gloucester-Hartpury
Lucy Packer	Scrum-half	2 February 2000 (aged 25)	26	(England) Harlequins
Flo Robinson	Scrum-half	4 October 2001 (aged 23)	0	(England) Exeter Chiefs
Holly Aitchison	Fly-half	13 September 1997 (aged 27)	35	(England) Bristol Bears
Zoe Harrison	Fly-half	14 April 1998 (aged 26)	54	(England) Saracens
Helena Rowland	Fly-half	19 September 1999 (aged 25)	34	(England) Loughborough Lightning
Tatyana Heard	Centre	14 January 1995 (aged 30)	26	(England) Gloucester-Hartpury
Megan Jones	Centre	23 October 1996 (aged 28)	21	(England) Leicester Tigers
Emily Scarratt	Centre	8 February 1990 (aged 35)	116	(England) Loughborough Lightning
Jade Shekells	Centre	28 September 1996 (aged 28)	0	(England) Gloucester-Hartpury
Jess Breach	Wing	4 November 1997 (aged 27)	43	(England) Saracens
Abigail Dow	Wing	29 September 1997 (aged 27)	48	(England) Trailfinders
Claudia MacDonald	Wing	4 January 1996 (aged 29)	32	(England) Exeter Chiefs
Mia Venner	Wing	3 May 2002 (aged 22)	1	(England) Gloucester-Hartpury
Ellie Kildunne	Fullback	8 September 1999 (aged 25)	48	(England) Harlequins
Emma Sing	Fullback	11 March 2001 (aged 24)	6	(England) Gloucester-Hartpury

== France ==
France's 32-player squad was announced on 7 March 2025.

On 3 April, Lazarko, Khalfaoui, R. Ménager, and Grisez were added to the squad to replace Sochat, Ikahehegi, Maka, and Tuy.

Head coach: (France) Gaëlle Mignot & (France) David Ortiz

Player	Position	Date of birth (age)	Caps	Club/province
Célia Domain	Hooker	24 April 2000 (aged 24)	7	(France) Blagnac SC
Mathilde Lazarko	Hooker		0	(France) ASM Romagnat
Élisa Riffonneau	Hooker	26 November 2003 (aged 21)	12	(France) FC Grenoble Amazones
Agathe Sochat	Hooker	21 May 1995 (aged 29)	56	(France) Stade Bordelais
Manon Bigot	Hooker	6 June 1990 (aged 34)	8	(France) Blagnac SC
Rose Bernadou	Prop	27 March 2000 (aged 24)	17	(France) Montpellier HR
Yllana Brosseau	Prop	5 September 2000 (aged 24)	16	(France) Stade Bordelais
Clara Joyeux	Prop	10 January 1998 (aged 27)	45	(France) Blagnac SC
Assia Khalfaoui	Prop	24 March 2001 (aged 23)	27	(France) Stade Bordelais
Madoussou Fall Raclot	Second row	17 March 1998 (aged 27)	34	(France) Stade Bordelais
Teani Feleu	Second row	19 December 2002 (aged 22)	7	(France) FC Grenoble Amazones
Manaé Feleu	Second row	3 February 2000 (aged 25)	21	(France) FC Grenoble Amazones
Hina Ikahehegi	Second row	29 April 2003 (aged 21)	3	(France) Stade Villeneuvois LM
Kiara Zago	Second row	11 October 2005 (aged 19)	3	(France) Stade Toulousain
Axelle Berthoumieu	Back row	9 July 2000 (aged 24)	17	(France) Blagnac SC
Séraphine Okemba	Back row	3 December 1995 (aged 29)	4	(France) Lyon OU
Léa Champon	Back row	25 February 2003 (aged 22)	3	(France) FC Grenoble Amazones
Charlotte Escudero	Back row	26 December 2000 (aged 24)	21	(France) Stade Toulousain
Romane Ménager	Number 8	26 July 1996 (aged 28)	66	(France) Montpellier HR
Taïna Maka	Back row	22 December 2004 (aged 20)	0	(France) FC Grenoble Amazones
Ambre-Saadia Mwayembe	Back row	23 January 2006 (aged 19)	14	(France) FC Grenoble Amazones
Océane Bordes	Scrum-half	16 May 2002 (aged 22)	1	(France) Stade Toulousain
Pauline Bourdon Sansus	Scrum-half	4 November 1995 (aged 29)	61	(France) Stade Toulousain
Alexandra Chambon	Scrum-half	2 August 2000 (aged 24)	25	(France) FC Grenoble Amazones
Carla Arbez	Fly-half	24 May 1999 (aged 25)	7	(France) Stade Bordelais
Lina Tuy	Fly-half	10 September 2004 (aged 20)	7	(France) ASM Romagnat
Nassira Konde	Centre	30 July 1999 (aged 25)	14	(France) Stade Bordelais
Lina Queyroi	Centre	18 May 2001 (aged 23)	17	(France) Stade Toulousain
Gabrielle Vernier	Centre	2 June 1997 (aged 27)	49	(France) Blagnac SC
Kelly Arbey	Wing	9 May 2005 (aged 19)	2	(France) Stade Toulousain
Joanna Grisez	Wing	5 October 1996 (aged 28)	5	(France) Stade Bordelais
Mélissande Llorens	Wing	18 June 2002 (aged 22)	12	(France) Blagnac SC
Marine Ménager	Wing	26 July 1996 (aged 28)	52	(France) Montpellier HR
Montserrat Amédée	Fullback	13 May 1996 (aged 28)	6	(France) Stade Bordelais
Émilie Boulard	Fullback	23 August 1999 (aged 25)	33	(France) Blagnac SC
Morgane Bourgeois	Fullback	6 February 2003 (aged 22)	8	(France) Stade Bordelais

== Ireland ==
Bemand announced Ireland's 40-player squad on 11 February 2025.

Head coach: (England) Scott Bemand

Player	Position	Date of birth (age)	Caps	Club/province
Neve Jones	Hooker	26 December 1998 (aged 26)	30	(England) Gloucester-Hartpury
Cliodhna Moloney	Hooker	31 May 1993 (aged 31)	38	(England) Exeter Chiefs
Sophie Barrett	Prop	27 January 2004 (aged 21)	0	(Ireland) Railway Union RFC / Ulster
Linda Djougang	Prop	17 May 1996 (aged 28)	41	(Ireland) Old Belvedere RFC / Leinster
Christy Haney	Prop	2 February 1994 (aged 31)	19	(Ireland) Blackrock College RFC / Leinster
Siobhán McCarthy	Prop	5 September 1995 (aged 29)	4	(Ireland) Munster
Sadhbh McGrath	Prop	30 August 2004 (aged 20)	12	(Ireland) Cooke RFC / Ulster
Niamh O'Dowd	Prop	21 April 2000 (aged 24)	11	(Ireland) Old Belvedere RFC / Leinster
Alma Atagamen	Lock		0	(Ireland) Balbriggan RFC
Ruth Campbell	Lock	27 June 2003 (aged 21)	2	(Ireland) Old Belvedere RFC / Leinster
Fiona Tuite	Lock	27 December 1996 (aged 28)	10	(Ireland) Old Belvedere RFC / Ulster
Dorothy Wall	Lock	4 May 2000 (aged 24)	32	(England) Exeter Chiefs / (Ireland) Munster
Claire Boles	Back row	28 May 1998 (aged 26)	3	(Ireland) Railway Union RFC / Ulster
Beth Buttimer	Back row	18 August 2005 (aged 19)	0	(Ireland) UL Bohemian RFC
Jane Clohessy	Back row	28 December 1998 (aged 26)	0	(Ireland) UL Bohemian RFC / Munster
Brittany Hogan	Back row	19 September 1998 (aged 26)	27	(Ireland) Old Belvedere RFC / Ulster
Erin King	Back row	21 October 2003 (aged 21)	4	(Ireland) Old Belvedere RFC
Edel McMahon	Back row	25 March 1994 (aged 30)	30	(England) Exeter Chiefs / (Ireland) Connacht
Grace Moore	Back row	21 May 1996 (aged 28)	17	(England) Ealing Trailfinders / (Ireland) IQ Rugby
Jane Neill	Back row	3 May 2004 (aged 20)	0	(Ireland) Old Belvedere RFC / Leinster
Deirbhile Nic a Bháird	Back row	22 September 1995 (aged 29)	11	(Ireland) Old Belvedere RFC / Munster
Aoife Wafer	Back row	25 March 2003 (aged 21)	11	(Ireland) Blackrock College RFC / Leinster
Caitríona Finn	Scrum-half	4 June 2006 (aged 18)	0	(Ireland) UL Bohemian RFC / Munster
Emily Lane	Scrum-half	10 January 1999 (aged 26)	10	(Ireland) Blackrock College RFC
Amy Larn	Scrum-half	14 July 2004 (aged 20)	0	(Ireland) Athy RFC
Aoibheann Reilly	Scrum-half	1 November 2000 (aged 24)	12	(Ireland) Blackrock College RFC / Connacht
Molly Scuffil-McCabe	Scrum-half	15 March 1998 (aged 27)	20	(Ireland) Leinster
Enya Breen	Fly-half	23 April 1999 (aged 25)	25	(Ireland) Blackrock College RFC / Munster
Stacey Flood	Fly-half	5 August 1996 (aged 28)	14	(Ireland) Railway Union RFC
Nicole Fowley	Fly-half	23 December 1992 (aged 32)	14	(Ireland) Galwegians RFC / Connacht
Dannah O'Brien	Fly-half	22 September 2003 (aged 21)	19	(Ireland) Old Belvedere RFC / Leinster
Aoife Dalton	Centre	3 May 2003 (aged 21)	18	(Ireland) Old Belvedere RFC / Leinster
Katie Heffernan	Centre	8 September 1998 (aged 26)	0	(Ireland) Railway Union RFC / Leinster
Eve Higgins	Centre	23 June 1999 (aged 25)	21	(Ireland) Railway Union RFC
Katie Corrigan	Wing	22 August 2005 (aged 19)	5	(Ireland) Old Belvedere RFC
Amee-Leigh Costigan	Wing	26 April 1995 (aged 29)	13	(Ireland) Railway Union RFC / Munster
Vicky Elmes Kinlan	Wing	21 February 2003 (aged 22)	1	(Ireland) Wicklow RFC
Anna McGann	Wing	4 June 1998 (aged 26)	6	(Ireland) Railway Union RFC
Béibhinn Parsons	Wing	30 November 2001 (aged 23)	26	(Ireland) Blackrock College RFC / Connacht
Méabh Deely	Fullback	25 October 2000 (aged 24)	13	(Ireland) Blackrock College RFC / Connacht

== Italy ==
Italy's 34-player squad was announced on 19 March.

Head coach: (Italy) Fabio Roselli

Player	Position	Date of birth (age)	Caps	Club/province
Laura Gurioli	Hooker	2 February 1995 (aged 30)	13	(Italy) Villorba
Desiree Spinelli	Hooker	28 April 2005 (aged 19)	uncapped	(Italy) Benetton
Vittoria Vecchini	Hooker	13 January 2002 (aged 23)	31	(Italy) Valsugana
Gaia Maris	Prop	5 December 2001 (aged 23)	32	(Italy) Valsugana
Alessia Pilani	Prop	6 March 1999 (aged 26)	7	(Italy) Colorno
Sara Seye	Prop	26 August 2000 (aged 24)	27	(England) Trailfinders
Emanuela Stecca	Prop	24 February 1997 (aged 28)	13	(Italy) Villorba
Silvia Turani	Prop	6 July 1995 (aged 29)	37	(England) Harlequins
Vittoria Zanette	Prop	29 November 2004 (aged 20)	1	(France) LOU Rugby
Giordana Duca	Second row	18 September 1992 (aged 32)	52	(Italy) Valsugana
Valeria Fedrighi	Second row	5 September 1992 (aged 32)	58	(Italy) Colorno
Alessandra Frangipani	Second row	12 July 2003 (aged 21)	11	(Italy) Villorba
Isabella Locatelli	Second row	23 October 1994 (aged 30)	51	(Italy) Colorno
Sara Tounesi	Second row	19 July 1995 (aged 29)	43	(France) Montpellier
Ilaria Arrighetti	Back row	2 March 1993 (aged 32)	62	(France) Stade Rennais
Giada Franco	Back row	11 July 1996 (aged 28)	32	(Italy) Colorno
Elisa Giordano	Back row	1 November 1990 (aged 34)	69	(Italy) Valsugana
Alissa Ranuccini	Back row	28 June 2000 (aged 24)	10	(Italy) Colorno
Francesca Sgorbini	Back row	7 January 2001 (aged 24)	28	(France) ASM Romagnat
Beatrice Veronese	Back row	11 March 1996 (aged 29)	22	(Italy) Valsugana
Alia Bitonci	Scrum-half	27 March 2006 (aged 18)	uncapped	(Italy) Valsugana
Sofia Stefan	Scrum-half	12 May 1992 (aged 32)	91	(England) Sale Sharks
Veronica Madia	Fly-half	16 January 1995 (aged 30)	52	(Italy) Colorno
Emma Stevanin	Fly-half	11 April 2002 (aged 22)	19	(Italy) Valsugana
Natascia Aggio	Centre		uncapped	(Italy) Valsugana
Giada Corradini	Centre	17 April 2002 (aged 22)	uncapped	(Italy) Colorno
Sara Mannini	Centre	28 August 2005 (aged 19)	4	(Italy) Colorno
Beatrice Rigoni	Centre	1 August 1995 (aged 29)	79	(England) Sale Sharks
Michela Sillari	Centre	23 February 1993 (aged 32)	87	(Italy) Valsugana
Beatrice Capomaggi	Utility back	29 April 1997 (aged 27)	19	(Italy) Villorba
Alyssa D'Incà	Utility back	23 March 2002 (aged 22)	26	(Italy) Villorba
Francesca Granzotto	Utility back	22 March 2002 (aged 23)	16	(Italy) Capitolina
Aura Muzzo	Utility back	12 April 1997 (aged 27)	49	(Italy) Villorba
Vittoria Ostuni Minuzzi	Utility back	6 December 2001 (aged 23)	37	(Italy) Valsugana

== Scotland ==
Scotland announced a 34-player squad on 19 February 2025.

Head coach: (Scotland) Bryan Easson

Player	Position	Date of birth (age)	Caps	Club/province
Elis Martin	Hooker	23 May 1999 (aged 25)	15	(England) Loughborough Lightning
Aila Ronald	Hooker	18 April 2004 (aged 20)	0	(Scotland) Edinburgh Rugby / University of Edinburgh
Lana Skeldon	Hooker	18 October 1993 (aged 31)	74	(England) Bristol Bears
Leah Bartlett	Prop	28 August 1998 (aged 26)	38	(England) Leicester Tigers
Christine Belisle	Prop	4 November 1993 (aged 31)	40	(England) Loughborough Lightning
Elliann Clarke	Prop	16 February 2001 (aged 24)	15	(England) Bristol Bears
Molly Poolman	Prop	10 May 2004 (aged 20)	0	(Scotland) Edinburgh Rugby / Watsonian FC
Anne Young	Prop	17 March 2000 (aged 25)	15	(England) Loughborough Lightning
Molly Wright	Prop	13 May 1991 (aged 33)	23	(England) Sale Sharks
Becky Boyd	Second row	17 May 2004 (aged 20)	0	(England) Loughborough Lightning
Sarah Bonar	Second row	9 February 1994 (aged 31)	42	(England) Harlequins
Hollie Cunningham	Second row	4 June 1999 (aged 25)	0	(England) Bristol Bears
Adelle Ferrie	Second row	14 October 1997 (aged 27)	0	(Scotland) Edinburgh Rugby / Corstorphine Cougars
Evie Gallagher	Back row	22 August 2000 (aged 24)	31	(England) Bristol Bears
Jade Konkel	Back row	9 December 1993 (aged 31)	66	(England) Harlequins
Rachel Malcolm (c)	Back row	23 May 1991 (aged 33)	52	(England) Loughborough Lightning
Rachel McLachlan	Back row	26 February 1999 (aged 26)	46	(France) Montpellier
Alex Stewart	Back row	28 May 2004 (aged 20)	8	(Scotland) Edinburgh Rugby / Corstorphine Cougars
Leia Brebner-Holden	Scrum-half	26 May 2002 (aged 22)	5	(England) Loughborough Lightning
Rhea Clarke	Scrum-half	31 August 2003 (aged 21)	0	(Scotland) Edinburgh Rugby / University of Edinburgh
Caity Mattinson	Scrum-half	17 May 1996 (aged 28)	27	(England) Ealing Trailfinders
Helen Nelson	Fly-half	24 May 1994 (aged 30)	65	(England) Loughborough Lightning
Beth Blacklock	Centre	13 November 1997 (aged 27)	3	(England) Saracens
Rachel Philipps	Centre	7 January 2002 (aged 23)	0	(England) Sale Sharks
Emma Orr	Centre	6 April 2003 (aged 21)	24	(England) Bristol Bears
Lisa Thomson	Centre	7 September 1997 (aged 27)	64	(England) Ealing Trailfinders
Evie Wills	Centre	4 February 2001 (aged 24)	3	(England) Leicester Tigers
Meg Varley	Centre	28 June 1999 (aged 25)	0	(England) Bristol Bears
Rhona Lloyd	Wing	17 October 1996 (aged 28)	52	(France) Stade Bordelais
Francesca McGhie	Wing	7 May 2003 (aged 21)	17	(England) Leicester Tigers
Liz Musgrove	Wing	25 December 1996 (aged 28)	18	(England) Ealing Trailfinders
Hannah Walker	Wing		0	(Scotland) Edinburgh Rugby University of Edinburgh
Chloe Rollie	Fullback	26 June 1995 (aged 29)	70	(England) Ealing Trailfinders
Lucia Scott	Fullback	3 February 2004 (aged 21)	3	(Scotland) Edinburgh Rugby / (England) Gloucester-Hartpury

== Wales ==
Head Coach, Sean Lynn, named Wales 37-player squad on 14 March 2025.

Head coach: (Wales) Sean Lynn

Player	Position	Date of birth (age)	Caps	Club/province
Rosie Carr	Hooker	2 March 2002 (aged 23)	2	(Wales) Brython Thunder
Kelsey Jones	Hooker	4 September 1997 (aged 27)	42	(England) Gloucester-Hartpury
Carys Phillips	Hooker	12 November 1992 (aged 32)	79	(England) Harlequins
Molly Reardon	Hooker	22 September 2003 (aged 21)	8	(Wales) Gwalia Lightning
Abbey Constable	Prop	18 June 1991 (aged 33)	10	(England) Leicester Tigers
Maisie Davies	Prop	17 August 2005 (aged 19)	1	(Wales) Gwalia Lightning
Gwenllian Pyrs	Prop	28 November 1997 (aged 27)	42	(England) Sale Sharks
Donna Rose	Prop	5 June 1991 (aged 33)	27	(England) Saracens
Jenni Scoble	Prop	28 March 1993 (aged 31)	1	(Wales) Gwalia Lightning
Gwen Crabb	Second row	28 June 1999 (aged 25)	28	(England) Gloucester-Hartpury
Georgia Evans	Second row	29 January 1997 (aged 28)	31	(England) Saracens
Natalia John	Second row	15 February 1996 (aged 29)	43	(Wales) Brython Thunder
Alaw Pyrs	Second row	12 October 2005 (aged 19)	3	(Wales) Gwalia Lightning
Alisha Butchers	Back row	14 June 1997 (aged 27)	54	(England) Bristol Bears
Alex Callender	Back row	29 July 2000 (aged 24)	41	(England) Harlequins
Abbie Fleming	Back row	31 March 1996 (aged 28)	23	(England) Harlequins
Gwennan Hopkins	Back row	14 November 2004 (aged 20)	5	(Wales) Gwalia Lightning
Bryonie King	Back row	14 August 2003 (aged 21)	6	(Wales) Gwalia Lightning
Bethan Lewis	Back row	19 February 1999 (aged 26)	51	(England) Gloucester-Hartpury
Kate Williams	Back row	5 April 2000 (aged 24)	16	(England) Gloucester-Hartpury
Keira Bevan	Scrum-half	28 April 1997 (aged 27)	68	(England) Bristol Bears
Meg Davies	Scrum-half	19 January 2002 (aged 23)	5	(England) Gloucester-Hartpury
Sian Jones	Scrum-half	3 December 2004 (aged 20)	10	(Wales) Gwalia Lightning
Ffion Lewis	Scrum-half	29 June 1996 (aged 28)		(England) Bristol Bears
Robyn Wilkins	Fly-half	1 April 1995 (aged 29)	70	(England) Sale Sharks
Catherine Richards	Centre	21 October 2000 (aged 24)	2	(Wales) Gwalia Lightning
Carys Cox	Centre	5 November 1998 (aged 26)	13	(England) Ealing Trailfinders
Lleucu George	Centre	12 January 2000 (aged 25)	27	(England) Gloucester-Hartpury
Hannah Jones (c)	Centre	14 November 1996 (aged 28)	58	(England) Gloucester-Hartpury
Kerin Lake	Centre	24 May 1990 (aged 34)	51	(Wales) Gwalia Lightning
Hannah Bluck	Wing	1 April 1997 (aged 27)	13	(Wales) Brython Thunder
Jasmine Joyce	Wing	9 October 1995 (aged 29)	42	(England) Bristol Bears
Courtney Keight	Wing	27 December 1997 (aged 27)	16	(England) Bristol Bears
Lisa Neumann	Wing	23 December 1993 (aged 31)	40	(England) Harlequins
Jenny Hesketh	Fullback	15 April 2002 (aged 22)	8	(England) Bristol Bears
Nel Metcalfe	Fullback	17 December 2004 (aged 20)	7	(England) Gloucester-Hartpury
Kayleigh Powell	Fullback	18 February 1999 (aged 26)	20	(England) Harlequins
