= 2024–25 Celtic Challenge =

Women's rugby union competition in Europe

- Countries: Ireland; Wales; Scotland
- Number of teams: 6
- Champions: (Ireland) Wolfhounds (2nd title)
- Runners-up: (Ireland) Clovers
- Matches played: 30

Official website
- celticrugbycomp.com

The 2024–25 Celtic Challenge was the third season of the Celtic Challenge, a cross-border women's rugby union competition with teams from Ireland, Wales, and Scotland. The six team tournament featured a full double round robin fixture series, with each team playing the others both home and away. Each team therefore played a ten match season, three more than the previous edition.

== Teams and locations ==
The coaches for this season have been announced. Lindsey Smith was promoted to Head Coach of Glasgow Warriors, the only change from last season.

Team	Country	Coach / Director of Rugby	Stadium	Location	Capacity
Brython Thunder	Wales	(Wales) Ashley Beck	Parc y Scarlets	Llanelli	14,870
Brython Thunder	Wales	(Wales) Ashley Beck	Eirias Stadium	Colwyn Bay	6,080
Clovers	Ireland	(Ireland) Denis Fogarty	Donnybrook Stadium	Dublin	6,000
Clovers	Ireland	(Ireland) Denis Fogarty	Musgrave Park	Cork	8,008
Edinburgh Rugby	Scotland	(Scotland) Claire Cruikshank	Edinburgh Rugby Stadium	Edinburgh	7,800
Glasgow Warriors	Scotland	(Scotland) Lindsey Smith	Scotstoun Stadium	Glasgow	9,708
Gwalia Lightning	Wales	(Wales) Catrina Nicholas-McLaughlin	Cardiff Arms Park	Cardiff	12,125
Wolfhounds	Ireland	(Ireland) Neil Alcorn	Musgrave Park	Cork	8,008
Wolfhounds	Ireland	(Ireland) Neil Alcorn	Ravenhill Stadium	Belfast	18,196
Wolfhounds	Ireland	(Ireland) Neil Alcorn	Donnybrook Stadium	Dublin	6,000

== Table ==
Pos	Team	Pld	W	D	L	PF	PA	PD	TF	TA	TB	LB	Pts	
1	(Ireland) Wolfhounds (C)	10	9	0	1	462	125	+337	74	20	8	0	44	Champions
2	(Ireland) Clovers	10	8	1	1	415	146	+269	69	23	8	0	42	
3	(Wales) Gwalia Lightning	10	6	0	4	241	252	−11	36	40	6	1	31	
4	(Wales) Brython Thunder	10	3	0	7	154	402	−248	26	66	4	1	17	
5	(Scotland) Edinburgh Rugby	10	2	0	8	225	392	−167	38	64	5	2	15	
6	(Scotland) Glasgow Warriors	10	1	1	8	182	362	−180	29	59	3	1	10	

Source: celticrugbycomp.com
Rules for classification: Four points for a win, two points for a draw. One bonus point for scoring four or more tries in a match; one bonus point for losing by a margin of seven or less.

== Regular season ==
The fixtures were announced on 20 November 2024.

=== Round 1 ===
20 December 2024
7.35pm

(1 BP) Edinburgh Rugby (Scotland)	63–15	(Scotland) Glasgow Warriors
	Report

Edinburgh Rugby Stadium, Edinburgh
Referee: Ruairidh Campbell

21 December 2024
2.30pm

(1 BP) Gwalia Lightning (Wales)	42–22	(Wales) Brython Thunder (1 BP)
	Report

CCB Centre for Sporting Excellence, Ystrad Mynach

22 December 2024
4pm

(1 BP) Wolfhounds (Ireland)	33–7	(Ireland) Clovers
	Report

Donnybrook Stadium, Dublin
Referee: Paul Haycock

=== Round 2 ===
28 December 2024
12pm

(1 BP) Clovers (Ireland)	31–10	(Ireland) Wolfhounds
	Report

UCD Bowl, Dublin

28 December 2024
2.30pm

Brython Thunder (Wales)	0–10	(Wales) Gwalia Lightning
	Report

Parc y Scarlets, Llanelli

=== Round 3 ===
4 January 2025
11:30am

(1 BP) Clovers (Ireland)	29–7	(Wales) Gwalia Lightning
	Report

Ravenhill Stadium, Belfast

4 January 2025
2pm

(1 BP) Edinburgh Rugby (Scotland)	22–15	(Wales) Brython Thunder (1 BP)
	Report

Edinburgh Rugby Stadium, Edinburgh

4 January 2025
2:30pm

(1 BP) Wolfhounds (Ireland)	48–7	(Scotland) Glasgow Warriors
	Report

Ravenhill Stadium, Belfast

=== Round 4 ===
11 January 2025
12pm

Brython Thunder (Wales)	0–48	(Ireland) Wolfhounds (1 BP)
	Report

Parc y Scarlets, Llanelli
Referee: Jack Davies

11 January 2025
3pm

(1 BP) Clovers (Ireland)	40–19	(Scotland) Edinburgh Rugby
	Report

Musgrave Park, Cork
Referee: Shane Tuohy

12 January 2025
1pm

(1 BP) Gwalia Lightning (Wales)	31–26	(Scotland) Glasgow Warriors (2 BP)
	Report

CCB Centre for Sporting Excellence, Ystrad Mynach

=== Round 5 ===
18 January 2025
1:30pm

(1 BP) Wolfhounds (Ireland)	57–5	(Wales) Brython Thunder
	Report

UCD Bowl, Dublin
Referee: Oisin Quinn

26 January 2025
11:30am

(2 BP) Edinburgh Rugby (Scotland)	27–29	(Wales) Gwalia Lightning (1 BP)
	Report

Edinburgh Rugby Stadium, Edinburgh

26 January 2025

Glasgow Warriors (Scotland)	0–0	(Ireland) Clovers
	Cancelled

Scotstoun Stadium, Glasgow

=== Round 6 ===
1 February 2025
11:30am

Glasgow Warriors (Scotland)	21–64	(Ireland) Wolfhounds (1 BP)
	Report

Scotstoun Stadium, Glasgow

1 February 2025
12pm

(1 BP) Clovers (Ireland)	58–0	(Wales) Brython Thunder
	Report

Ravenhill Stadium, Belfast
Referee: Peter Martin

1 February 2025
2pm

(1 BP) Gwalia Lightning (Wales)	26–5	(Scotland) Edinburgh Rugby
	Report

CCB Centre for Sporting Excellence, Ystrad Mynach
Referee: David Sutherland

=== Round 7 ===
8 February 2025
12:30pm

(1 BP) Brython Thunder (Wales)	38–32	(Scotland) Edinburgh Rugby (2 BP)
	Report

Parc y Scarlets, Llanelli

9 February 2025
12:30pm

Wolfhounds (Ireland)	21–15	(Wales) Gwalia Lightning (1 BP)
	Report

Musgrave Park, Cork
Referee: Paudie Sheehan

9 February 2025
3:30pm

(1 BP) Clovers (Ireland)	41–19	(Scotland) Glasgow Warriors
	Report

Musgrave Park, Cork
Referee: Tomás O’Sullivan

=== Round 2 (postponed fixture) ===
15 February 2025
2pm

(1 BP) Glasgow Warriors (Scotland)	36–17	(Scotland) Edinburgh Rugby
	Report

Scotstoun Stadium, Glasgow
Referee: Jonny Perriam

=== Round 8 ===
22 February 2025
11:30am

Brython Thunder (Wales)	7–94	(Ireland) Clovers (1 BP)
	Report

Parc y Scarlets, Llanelli
Referee: Jess Kavanagh

22 February 2025
1pm

Glasgow Warriors (Scotland)	19–31	(Wales) Gwalia Lightning (1 BP)
	Report

Scotstoun Stadium, Glasgow

22 February 2025
2pm

(1 BP) Edinburgh Rugby (Scotland)	22–31	(Ireland) Wolfhounds (1 BP)
	Report

Edinburgh Rugby Stadium, Edinburgh
Referee: Sam O’Neil

=== Round 9 ===
1 March 2025
12pm

Gwalia Lightning (Wales)	17–48	(Ireland) Wolfhounds (1 BP)
	Report

CCB Centre for Sporting Excellence, Ystrad Mynach
Referee: Will Goodwin

1 March 2025
1pm

Edinburgh Rugby (Scotland)	18–60	(Ireland) Clovers (1 BP)
	Report

Edinburgh Rugby Stadium, Edinburgh
Referee: Daniel Evans

1 March 2025
3:45pm

Glasgow Warriors (Scotland)	17–33	(Wales) Brython Thunder (1 BP)
	Report

Scotstoun Stadium, Glasgow

=== Round 10 ===
8 March 2025
12pm

(1 BP) Gwalia Lightning (Wales)	33–55	(Ireland) Clovers (1 BP)
	Report

CCB Centre for Sporting Excellence, Ystrad Mynach
Referee: Jess Kavanagh

8 March 2025
12:15pm

(1 BP) Wolfhounds (Ireland)	102–0	(Scotland) Edinburgh Rugby
	Report

Donnybrook Stadium, Dublin
Referee: Paul O’Connor

9 March 2025
12pm

(1 BP) Brython Thunder (Wales)	34–22	(Scotland) Glasgow Warriors (1 BP)
	Report

Parc y Scarlets, Llanelli
