= 2023–24 Celtic Challenge =

Women's rugby union competition in Europe

- Countries: Ireland; Wales; Scotland
- Number of teams: 6
- Champions: (Ireland) Wolfhounds (1st title)
- Runners-up: (Scotland) Edinburgh
- Matches played: 21

Official website
- celticrugbycomp.com

The 2023–24 Celtic Challenge was the second season of the Celtic Challenge, a cross-border women's rugby union competition with teams from Ireland, Wales, and Scotland. The enlarged six team tournament featured a single round robin fixture series, after which the table was split in two. This was followed by three further 'play-off' rounds in a set of three double-header fixtures. Each team played a seven match season.

== Teams and locations ==
In December 2023, the six teams were confirmed.

Team	Country	Coach / Director of Rugby	Stadium	Location	Capacity
Brython Thunder	Wales	(Wales) Ashley Beck	Parc y Scarlets	Llanelli	14,870
Brython Thunder	Wales	(Wales) Ashley Beck	Eirias Stadium	Colwyn Bay	6,080
Clovers	Ireland	(Ireland) Denis Fogarty	Donnybrook Stadium	Dublin	6,000
Clovers	Ireland	(Ireland) Denis Fogarty	Musgrave Park	Cork	8,008
Edinburgh Rugby	Scotland	(Scotland) Claire Cruikshank	Edinburgh Rugby Stadium	Edinburgh	7,800
Glasgow Warriors	Scotland	(Scotland) Chris Laidlaw	Scotstoun Stadium	Glasgow	9,708
Gwalia Lightning	Wales	(Wales) Catrina Nicholas-McLaughlin	Cardiff Arms Park	Cardiff	12,125
Wolfhounds	Ireland	(Ireland) Neil Alcorn	Musgrave Park	Cork	8,008
Wolfhounds	Ireland	(Ireland) Neil Alcorn	Ravenhill Stadium	Belfast	18,196
Wolfhounds	Ireland	(Ireland) Neil Alcorn	Donnybrook Stadium	Dublin	6,000

== Table ==
Pos	Team	Pld	W	D	L	PF	PA	PD	TF	TA	TB	LB	Pts
1	(Ireland) Wolfhounds	7	6	1	0	238	130	+108	38	22	6	0	32
2	(Scotland) Edinburgh Rugby	7	4	2	1	160	134	+26	26	22	5	0	25
3	(Ireland) Clovers	7	3	1	3	142	147	−5	23	23	2	1	17
4	(Wales) Gwalia Lightning	7	3	0	4	164	134	+30	20	22	3	2	17
5	(Wales) Brython Thunder	7	3	0	4	113	137	−24	20	22	3	1	16
6	(Scotland) Glasgow Warriors	7	0	0	7	87	222	−135	13	29	0	1	1

Rules for classification: After Round 5, the table is split in two for the final two play-off rounds.

== Regular season ==
The fixtures were announced on 5 December 2023.

=== Round 1 ===
29 December 2023
13:00

Wolfhounds (Ireland)	21–15	(Ireland) Clovers (1 BP)
Try: Linda Djougang 63' c Sarah Delaney 69' c Eimear Corri 77' c Con: Nikki Caughey (3) 63', 69', 77'; Cards: Keelin Brady (yellow card) 74' to 80'	Report	Try: Beth Buttimer 38' m Ailsa Hughes 58' m Clara Barrett 80+1' m

Musgrave Park, Cork
Referee: Joy Neville

30 December 2023
12:00

(1 BP) Edinburgh Rugby (Scotland)	28–12	(Scotland) Glasgow Warriors
Try: Bell, McNamara (2), Fletcher; Con: Marlow (4)	Report	Try: McMillan, Tucker; Con: MacRae

Edinburgh Rugby Stadium, Edinburgh
Attendance: 1,934
Referee: Hollie Davidson

1 January 2024
14:00

Gwalia Lightning (Wales)	20–5	(Wales) Brython Thunder
Try: K Williams, C Richards (2); Con: Metcalfe; Pen: Metcalfe	Report	Try: M Davies

Rodney Parade, Newport

=== Round 2 ===
6 January 2024
14:00

Edinburgh Rugby (Scotland)	17–27	(Ireland) Wolfhounds (1 BP)
Try: Emma Orr (2), Cieron Bell; Con: Briar McNamara	Report	Try: Sarah Delaney, Natasja Behan, Aoife Wafer (2), Brittany Hogan; Con: Dannah O’Brien

Edinburgh Rugby Stadium, Edinburgh
Referee: Michael Todd

6 January 2024
14:00

Clovers (Ireland)	20–5	(Wales) Brython Thunder
Try: Ailsa Hughes, Ruth Campbell, Sadhbh McGrath; Con: Méabh Deely; Pen: Méabh Deely	Report	Try: Alex Callender

Donnybrook Stadium, Dublin
Referee: Michael Forrestal

7 January 2024
13:30

Gwalia Lightning (Wales)	36–19	(Scotland) Glasgow Warriors
Try: Hopkins (2), Richards, Hughes, Constable, Jones; Con: Metcalfe (3)	Report	Try: Bogan, Tucker (2); Con: Macrae (2)

Cardiff Arms Park, Cardiff

=== Round 3 ===
13 January 2024
14:30

Glasgow Warriors (Scotland)	12–40	(Ireland) Wolfhounds (1 BP)
Try: Phaedra Snailham, Louise McMillan; Con: Lucy MacRae; Cards: Phaedra Snailham (yellow card) 75' to 80'	Report	Try: Sarah Delaney, Linda Djougang, Sophie Barrett, Katie Whelan, Katie Corrigan, Brittany Hogan; Con: Dannah O’Brien (2), Nikki Caughey (3)

Scotstoun Stadium, Glasgow
Referee: Sam O’Neil

14 January 2024
13:00

Clovers (Ireland)	19–17	(Wales) Gwalia Lightning (1 BP)
Try: Kate Flannery, Clare Gorman, Róisín Ormond; Con: Kate Flannery (2); Cards: Alana McInerney (yellow card) 33' to 43', Beth Buttimer (yellow card) 52' to 62'	Report	Try: Gwennan Hopkins, Molly Reardon, Tess Evans; Con: Sian Jones

Musgrave Park, Cork
Referee: Kevin Coffey

14 January 2024
13:30

(1 BP) Brython Thunder (Wales)	17–22	(Scotland) Edinburgh Rugby (1 BP)
Try: Wakely, Tromans, A Williams; Con: A Williams; Cards: E Tromans (yellow card)	Report	Try: Muzambe, Mattinson, Walker, Bell; Con: Marlow

Parc y Scarlets, Llanelli

=== Round 4 ===
27 January 2024
14:00

Glasgow Warriors (Scotland)	10–29	(Ireland) Clovers (1 BP)
Try: Izzy Hannay, Beth Blacklock	Report	Try: Méabh Deely, Dorothy Wall, Beth Buttimer, Ivana Kiripati, Brianna Heylmann; Con: Kate Flannery (2)

Scotstoun Stadium, Glasgow
Referee: Ciaran Stark

27 January 2024
19:30

(1 BP) Wolfhounds (Ireland)	41–10	(Wales) Brython Thunder
Try: Brittany Hogan, Sarah Delaney, Katie Corrigan (4), Niamh Marley; Con: Nikki Caughey (3)	Report	Try: Chloe Thomas-Bradley, Sioned Harries

Ravenhill Stadium, Belfast
Referee: Andrew Munce

28 January 2024
13:30

(1 BP) Gwalia Lightning (Wales)	19–20	(Scotland) Edinburgh Rugby (1 BP)
Try: Jones (2), Thicker; Con: Wilkins (2)	Report	Try: Whitehouse, Bell, Fletcher, Muzambe

Cardiff Arms Park, Cardiff

=== Round 5 ===
3 February 2024
12:30

(1 BP) Edinburgh Rugby (Scotland)	35–21	(Ireland) Clovers
Try: Molly Poolman, Millie Whitehouse, Emma Orr, Sarah Denholm, Lisa Thomson; Con: Nicole Marlow, Briar McNamara; Pen: Nicole Marlow, Briar McNamara	Report	Try: Alana McInerney, Niamh O’Dowd, Chisom Ugwueru; Con: Kate Flannery (2), Méabh Deely

Edinburgh Rugby Stadium, Edinburgh
Referee: Rob McDowell

3 February 2024
14:30

(1 BP) Wolfhounds (Ireland)	36–24	(Wales) Gwalia Lightning (1 BP)
Try: Katie Heffernan, Katie Corrigan (3), Niamh Marley, Christy Haney; Con: Nikki Caughey (3)	Report	Try: Katie Thicker, Jenna De Vera, Caitlin Lewis, Rebecca De Filippo; Con: Robyn Wilkins (2)

Donnybrook Stadium, Dublin
Referee: Max Weston

3 February 2024
14:30

(1 BP) Brython Thunder (Wales)	22–12	(Scotland) Glasgow Warriors
Try: Callender (2), Williams, Singleton; Con: Wilkinson	Report	Try: Fraser (2); Con: Ainsworth

Eirias Stadium, Colwyn Bay

== Play-offs ==
Unlike the inaugural competition, the 2023–24 competition will have a play-off stage. This involves splitting the teams into 2 tiers after the initial set of 5 rounds, the top 3 and the bottom 3. The teams will play the teams in their tier once more. The points from the all matches will count.

=== Round 6 ===
17 February 2024
13:00

(1 BP) Edinburgh Rugby (Scotland)	26–26	(Ireland) Wolfhounds (1 BP)
Try: Emma Orr (2), Cieron Bell, Alex Stewart; Con: Nicole Marlow (3)	Report	Try: Ellen Boylan, Christy Haney, Linda Djougang, Katie Corrigan; Con: Nikki Caughey (3)

Edinburgh Rugby Stadium, Edinburgh
Referee: David Young

17 February 2024
16:30

(1 BP) Glasgow Warriors (Scotland)	17–24	(Wales) Brython Thunder (1 BP)
Try: McLaren, Fraser; Con: MacRae (2); Pen: MacRae	Report	Try: Harries, Thomas-Bradley, Wakely, Webb; Con: Wilkinson (2)

Scotstoun Stadium, Glasgow

=== Round 7 ===
24 February 2024
12:30

(1 BP) Gwalia Lightning (Wales)	43–5	(Scotland) Glasgow Warriors
Try: King, Wilkins, M Davies, Constable, Reardon, K Davies, Parry; Con: Wilkins (4)	Report	Try: Anderson

Kingspan Stadium, Belfast

24 February 2024
16:30

(1 BP) Wolfhounds (Ireland)	47–26	(Ireland) Clovers (1 BP)
Try: Katie Corrigan (3), Kelly McCormill, Hannah O’Connor, Katie Whelan (2); Con: Nikki Caughey (6)	Report	Try: Róisín Ormond, Beth Buttimer, Maeve Óg O’Leary, Brianna Heylmann; Con: Kate Flannery (2), Nicole Fowley

Kingspan Stadium, Belfast
Referee: Andrew Mitchell

=== Round 8 ===
3 March 2024
12:30

Clovers (Ireland)	12–12	(Scotland) Edinburgh Rugby
Try: Gorman, Barrett; Con: Flannery	Report	Try: McNamara, Lloyd; Con: Marlow

Parc y Scarlets, Llanelli
Referee: Jenny Davies

3 March 2024
15:30

Brython Thunder (Wales)	30–5	(Wales) Gwalia Lightning
Try: Tromans, A Williams, Wakely, Harries, Morgan; Con: Wilkinson; Drop: Harries	Report	Try: M Davies

Parc y Scarlets, Llanelli
