= Glasgow Warriors Women =

Scottish rugby union club, based in Glasgow

- Full name: Glasgow Warriors Women
- Union: Scottish Rugby Union
- Founded: 2023
- Location: Glasgow, Scotland
- Ground: Scotstoun Stadium (Capacity: 7,351 using additional temporary seating)
- Coach: Lindsey Smith
- League: Celtic Challenge
Team kit

Official website
- glasgowwarriors.org
- Current season

Glasgow Warriors Women are a select provincial rugby union side from Scotland. The team plays in the Celtic Challenge league.

== History ==
Glasgow Warriors Women was formed in December 2023 by Glasgow Warriors and the Scottish Rugby Union to play in the Celtic Challenge, a cross-border women's rugby union competition that will be held annually. The competition was launched in 2023 and is designed to develop players for the Celtic nations of Ireland, Scotland and Wales.

The 2023–24 season saw Glasgow trail in the Celtic Challenge league picking up only 1 league point from their 7 matches. The point came in the last play-off rounds.

For the 2024–25 season, Lindsey Smith was promoted from Assistant Coach to Head Coach with Chris Laidlaw stepping down. A better season than last, the team picked up one win and one draw. They nonetheless finished bottom of the table once more.

== Stadium ==
Glasgow Warriors women's side play their home matches at Scotstoun Stadium.

== Records and achievements ==
=== Season standings ===
Celtic Challenge

| Season | Pos | Pld | W | D | L | F | A | +/- | BP | Pts | Notes |
|---|---|---|---|---|---|---|---|---|---|---|---|
| 2023-24 | 6th | 7 | 0 | 0 | 7 | 87 | 222 | -135 | 1 | 1 | |
| 2024-25 | 6th | 10 | 1 | 1 | 8 | 182 | 362 | -180 | 4 | 10 | |

== Current standings ==
| Pos | Team | Pld | W | D | L | PF | PA | PD | TF | TA | TB | LB | Pts | Qualification |
|---|---|---|---|---|---|---|---|---|---|---|---|---|---|---|
| 1 | (Ireland) Wolfhounds (Q) | 10 | 9 | 0 | 1 | 431 | 127 | +304 | 66 | 20 | 9 | 0 | 45 | Play-offs |
| 2 | (Ireland) Clovers (Q) | 10 | 8 | 0 | 2 | 294 | 231 | +63 | 48 | 37 | 7 | 0 | 39 | Play-offs |
| 3 | (Wales) Gwalia Lightning (Q) | 10 | 4 | 0 | 6 | 217 | 212 | +5 | 34 | 35 | 5 | 4 | 25 | Play-offs |
| 4 | (Wales) Brython Thunder (Q) | 10 | 5 | 0 | 5 | 150 | 218 | −68 | 24 | 35 | 2 | 1 | 23 | Play-offs |
| 5 | (Scotland) Glasgow Warriors | 10 | 2 | 0 | 8 | 154 | 236 | −82 | 32 | 49 | 6 | 3 | 17 | |
| 6 | (Scotland) Edinburgh Rugby | 10 | 2 | 0 | 8 | 152 | 321 | −169 | 19 | 37 | 3 | 1 | 12 | |

First match(es) will be played: 20 December 2025. Source: Celtic Challenge
Rules for classification: Four points for a win, two points for a draw. One bonus point for scoring four or more tries in a match; one bonus point for losing by a margin of seven or less.

== Coaches ==
Lindsey Smith was named as the new Head Coach in November 2024.

| Name | Position |
|---|---|
| (Scotland) Lindsey Smith | Head coach |
| (Scotland) Megan Kennedy | Assistant coach |
| (Scotland) Stuart Lewis | Assistant coach |
| (Scotland) | Forwards Coach |
| (Scotland) Fraser Brown | Defence Coach |

== Current squad ==
The squad for the 2023–24 Season was announced on 19 December 2023.

On 28 December 2023, Emma Turner and Rhea Clarke were named as co-captains. Note: Flags indicate national union under World Rugby eligibility rules. Players may hold more than one non-World Rugby nationality.

| Player | Position | Union |
|---|---|---|
| Karis Craig (Note: Scottish Rugby Regional Training Centre supported player) | Hooker | Scotland |
| Nikki Simpson | Hooker | Scotland |
| Chloe Brown | Prop | Scotland |
| Eilidh Fleming | Prop | Scotland |
| Kaylee Fraser | Prop | Scotland |
| Debbie Lee | Prop | Scotland |
| Hannah McMahon | Prop | Scotland |
| Ailie Tucker | Prop | Scotland |
| Holland Bogan | Second row | Scotland |
| Eve Thomson | Second row | Scotland |
| Ellie Williamson | Second row | Scotland |
| Sophie Anderson | Back row | Scotland |
| Megan Hyland | Back row | Scotland |
| Alex Love | Back row | Scotland |
| Alison Orr | Back row | Scotland |
| Kirsty Ritchie | Back row | Scotland |
| Emma Turner (cc) | Back row | Scotland |
| Lucy Winter | Back row | Scotland |

| Player | Position | Union |
|---|---|---|
| Rhea Clarke (cc) | Scrum-half | Scotland |
| Rebekah Douglas | Scrum-half | Scotland |
| Ceitidh Ainsworth | Fly-half | Scotland |
| Carla McDonald | Fly-half | Scotland |
| Pearl Kellie | Centre | Scotland |
| Lucy MacRae | Centre | Scotland |
| Claudia McLaren | Centre | Scotland |
| Charlotte Burrows | Wing | Scotland |
| Roma Fraser | Wing | Scotland |
| Pheadra Snailham | Wing | Scotland |
| Beth Tobin | Wing | Scotland |
| Sky Phimister | Fullback | Scotland |

=== Transitional players ===
On 27 December 2023, Scottish Rugby announced 11 transitional players that could play for either Scottish Celtic challenge team. Transitional players were selected through a Scottish qualified programme, a programme to develop and support Scottish qualified players living outside of Scotland, as well as players who have previously been involved with Scotland but currently live outside of Scotland.

| Name | Position | Club |
|---|---|---|
| Izzy Hannay | Flanker | (England) Harlequins |
| Gemma Bell | Flanker | (England) Gloucester-Hartpury |
| Evie Addy | Prop | (England) Gloucester-Hartpury |
| Nicole Marlow | Fly Half | (Wales) Cardiff Metropolitan University |
| Leia Brebner-Holden | Scrum Half | (England) Gloucester-Hartpury |
| Izzy McGuire-Evans | Centre | (England) Sale Sharks |
| Orla Proctor | Full Back | (England) Leicester Tigers |
| Nicola Haynes | Hooker | (England) Saracens |
| Demi Swann | Prop | (England) Exeter Chiefs |
| Fiona McIntosh | Lock | (England) Saracens |
| Panashe Muzambe | Prop | (England) Exeter Chiefs |

=== International players ===
International players released to play for Glasgow Warriors in the Celtic Challenge league.

| Name | Position | Club |
|---|---|---|
| Louise McMillan | Lock | (England) Saracens |
| Mairi McDonald | Scrum Half | (England) Exeter Chiefs |
| Beth Blacklock | Centre | (England) Saracens |
| Coreen Grant | Wing | (England) Saracens |

=== Squad additions ===
Other players added to the original squad.

| Name | Position | Club |
|---|---|---|
| Priya Crawford | Scrum Half | (Scotland) Strathclyde University |
| Gisele Chicot | Centre | (Scotland) Heriots Blues |
| Kiyomi Honjigawa | Full Back | (Scotland) Corstorphine Cougars |

== Notable former coaches & management ==
=== Former Head coaches ===
| Coach | Period(s) |
|---|---|
| (Scotland) Chris Laidlaw | 2023 – 11/2024 |

== End of season awards ==
The Player's Player of the Season award is in memory of Siobhan Cattigan.

=== 2023 - 24 season ===
| Award | Winner |
|---|---|
| Coaches Player of the Season | (Scotland) Holland Bogan |
| Player's Player of the Season | (Scotland) Ailie Tucker |

=== 2024 - 25 season ===
| Award | Winner |
|---|---|
| Coaches Player of the Season | (Scotland) Ceitidh Ainsworth |
| Player's Player of the Season | (Scotland) Freya Walker |
