= Edinburgh Rugby Women =

Scottish rugby union club, based in Edinburgh

Edinburgh Rugby
- Full name: Edinburgh Rugby Women
- Union: Scottish Rugby Union
- Founded: 2023
- Location: Edinburgh, Scotland
- Ground: Hive Stadium (Capacity: 7,800)
- Coach: Claire Cruikshank
- League: Celtic Challenge
Team kit

Official website
- edinburghrugby.org
- Current season

Edinburgh Rugby Women are a select provincial rugby union side from Scotland. The team plays in the Celtic Challenge league.

== History ==
Edinburgh Rugby Women was formed in December 2023 by Edinburgh Rugby and the Scottish Rugby Union to play in the Celtic Challenge, a cross-border women's rugby union competition that will be held annually. The competition was launched in 2023 and is designed to develop players for the Celtic nations of Ireland, Scotland and Wales.

== Stadium ==
Edinburgh Rugby women's side play their home matches at Hive Stadium.

== Current standings ==
| Pos | Team | Pld | W | D | L | PF | PA | PD | TF | TA | TB | LB | Pts | |
|---|---|---|---|---|---|---|---|---|---|---|---|---|---|---|
| 1 | (Wales) Brython Thunder | 0 | 0 | 0 | 0 | 0 | 0 | 0 | 0 | 0 | 0 | 0 | 0 | qualifies for home semi-final |
| 2 | (Ireland) Clovers | 0 | 0 | 0 | 0 | 0 | 0 | 0 | 0 | 0 | 0 | 0 | 0 | qualifies for home semi-final |
| 3 | (Scotland) Edinburgh Rugby | 0 | 0 | 0 | 0 | 0 | 0 | 0 | 0 | 0 | 0 | 0 | 0 | qualifies for semi-final |
| 4 | (Scotland) Glasgow Warriors | 0 | 0 | 0 | 0 | 0 | 0 | 0 | 0 | 0 | 0 | 0 | 0 | qualifies for semi-final |
| 5 | (Wales) Gwalia Lightning | 0 | 0 | 0 | 0 | 0 | 0 | 0 | 0 | 0 | 0 | 0 | 0 | |
| 6 | (Ireland) Wolfhounds | 0 | 0 | 0 | 0 | 0 | 0 | 0 | 0 | 0 | 0 | 0 | 0 | |

Source: celticrugbycomp.com
Rules for classification: Four points for a win, two points for a draw. One bonus point for scoring four or more tries in a match; one bonus point for losing by a margin of seven or less.

== Coaches ==
The coaching team was announced in December 2024.

| Name | Position |
|---|---|
| (Scotland) Claire Cruikshank | Head coach |

== Current squad ==
2024/25 Squad
Forwards

Adelle Ferrie (Corstorphine Cougars) Aila Ronald (University of Edinburgh) Alex Stewart (Corstorphine Cougars) Alison Wilson (Heriots) Caroline Bullock (University of Edinburgh) Charlotte Russell (Watsonians) Chloe Brown (Stirling County) Faye Sutherland (Corstorphine Cougars) Georgia Young (Watsonians) Hannah McMahon (University of Edinburgh) Karis Craig (Watsonians) Megan Riach (Garioch) Merryn Gunderson (Corstorphine Cougars) Millie Capaldi (Heriots) Molly Poolman (Watsonians) Natasha Logan (University of Edinburgh) Samaanther Taganekurukuru (Stirling County) Talei Tawake (Watsonians)

Backs

Ami Conchie (Watsonians) April McKenzie (Watsonians) Dawn Lawrie (Watsonians) Emily Love (Corstorphine Cougars) Giselle Chicot (Watsonians) Hannah Ramsay (University of Edinburgh) Hannah Walker (University of Edinburgh) Holly Mclntyre (University of Edinburgh) Lisa Brown (University of Edinburgh) Lucy MacRae (University of Edinburgh) Pip Benson (Corstorphine Cougars) Rhea Clarke (University of Edinburgh)

2023/24 Squad
The squad for the 2023–24 season was announced on 18 December 2023. On 29 December 2023 Sarah Denholm was named as captain as part of the first game squad announcement.

Note: Flags indicate national union under World Rugby eligibility rules. Players may hold more than one non-World Rugby nationality.

| Player | Position | Union |
|---|---|---|
| Aila Ronald (Note: Scottish Rugby Regional Training Centre supported player.) | Hooker | Scotland |
| Millie Whitehouse | Hooker | Scotland |
| Katie Lindsay | Prop | Scotland |
| Poppy Fletcher | Prop | Scotland |
| Alison Wilson | Prop | Scotland |
| Millie Capaldi | Prop | Scotland |
| Molly Poolman | Prop | Scotland |
| Adelle Ferrie | Second row | Scotland |
| Lucy Kidd | Second row | Scotland |
| Natasha Logan | Second row | Scotland |
| Rachel Cox | Back row | Scotland |
| Merryn Gunderson | Back row | Scotland |
| Alex Stewart | Back row | Scotland |
| Sam Taganekurukuru | Back row | Scotland |
| Sophie Murphy | Back row | Scotland |
| Freya Walker | Number 8 | Scotland |

| Player | Position | Union |
|---|---|---|
| Ami Conchie | ?? | Scotland |
| Sarah Denholm (cc) | Fly-half | Scotland |
| April McKenzie | ?? | Scotland |
| Briar McNamara | Centre | Scotland |
| Cieron Bell | Wing | Scotland |
| Emma Orr | Centre | Scotland |
| Giselle Chicot | ?? | Scotland |
| Hannah Chrisp | ?? | Scotland |
| Hannah Ramsay | ?? | Scotland |
| Hannah Walker | Wing | Scotland |
| Mary Nelson | ?? | Scotland |
| Nicole Flynn | ?? | Scotland |
| Rachel Philipps | ?? | Scotland |
| Zoe Turner | ?? | Scotland |

=== Transitional players ===
On 27 December 2023, Scottish Rugby announced 11 transitional players that could play for either Scottish Celtic challenge team. Transitional players were selected through a Scottish qualified programme, a programme to develop and support Scottish qualified players living outside of Scotland, as well as players who have previously been involved with Scotland but currently live outside of Scotland.

| Name | Position | Club |
|---|---|---|
| Izzy Hannay | Flanker | (England) Harlequins |
| Gemma Bell | Flanker | (England) Gloucester-Hartpury |
| Evie Addy | Prop | (England) Gloucester-Hartpury |
| Nicole Marlow | Fly Half | (Wales) Cardiff Metropolitan University |
| Leia Brebner-Holden | Scrum Half | (England) Gloucester-Hartpury |
| Izzy McGuire-Evans | Centre | (England) Sale Sharks |
| Orla Proctor | Full Back | (England) Leicester Tigers |
| Nicola Haynes | Hooker | (England) Saracens |
| Demi Swann | Prop | (England) Exeter Chiefs |
| Fiona McIntosh | Lock | (England) Saracens |
| Panashe Muzambe | Prop | (England) Exeter Chiefs |

=== International players ===
International players released to play for Edinburgh Rugby in the Celtic Challenge league.

| Name | Position | Club |
|---|---|---|
| Caity Mattinson | Scrum Half | (England) Gloucester-Hartpury |
| Jenny Maxwell | Scrum Half | (England) Loughborough Lightning |
