= Brittany Hogan =

Ireland international rugby union player

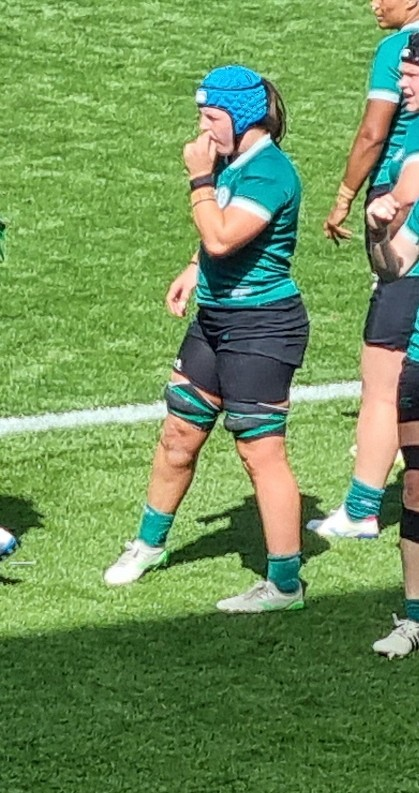
- Hogan with Ireland in 2025
- Born: 19 September 1998 (age 28) Dundonald, Co Down, N.Ireland
- Height: 173 cm (5 ft 8 in)
- Weight: 80 kg (176 lb)

Rugby union career
- Position: Back Row
- Current team: Sale Sharks Women
Senior career
Years	Team	Apps	(Points)
2015-2017	Ballynahinch		
2017-2019	Cooke		
2019	Railway Union		
2020	Old Belvedere		
2026-	Sale Sharks Women		
Provincial / State sides
Years	Team	Apps	(Points)
2017-	Ulster		
2023	Combined Provinces	2	(0)
2023-	Wolfhounds	11	(25)
International career
Years	Team	Apps	(Points)
2020–	Ireland	45	(25)
- Correct as of 31 October 2026
National sevens team
Years	Team		Comps
2017	Ireland 7s		12

Brittany Hogan (born 19 September 1998) is an Irish rugby player for Sale Sharks Women in Premiership Women's Rugby. She has represented the Ireland women's national rugby union team and the Ireland women's national rugby sevens team.

== Club career ==
Hogan began playing rugby in her local club, Ballynahinch RFC, at the age of 16.

She has been capped by Ulster at all age grades and was part of the Ulster team that won the first Ireland U18 Interprovincial Series in 2016.

She played one season with Cooke RFC and, when she moved to Dublin to study in 2018, joined All-Ireland League club Old Belvedere RFC.

She was named Ulster women's player of the year for the 2023–24 season in the 2024 Ulster Rugby Awards.

She represented the Combined Irish Provinces in the 2023 Celtic Challenge, and the Wolfhounds in the 2023–24 and 2024–25 editions of the same competition.

== International career ==
Hogan got a professional contract with Irish Rugby Union's Sevens programme in August 2017 and made her debut in the World Rugby Sevens Series in Dubai in 2018, scoring a try against New Zealand on her first day on the series.

She debuted for the Ireland women's VXs in October 2020, as a replacement against Italy, in the final game of the 2020 Women's Six Nations.

In the 2021 Women's Six Nations she was a replacement against Wales and England and got her first Test start in the third-place playoff against Italy which Ireland won 25–5. In the 2022 TikTok Women's Six Nations Championship she started at number 8 against both Wales and France. Brittany earned her 10th cap against Italy where Ireland won 29–08.

She was selected for the Ireland women's national rugby sevens team for the 2021–2022 season. She is a regular member of the World Series 7s squad and was a part of the history making team in Seville 2022, achieving 2nd place.

She was named in Ireland's XVs side for the 2025 Six Nations Championship in March. On 11 August, she made the Irish squad to the Rugby World Cup.

Hogan signed for Sale Sharks during the 2025-2026 Premiership Women's Rugby season.

She was nominated for Women's 15s Player of the Year at the 2026 Rugby Players Ireland awards.

== Personal life ==
Hogan graduated Dublin City University with a First class honours in sports science and health in 2022. She is a qualified Level 1 and 2 coach in rugby and hockey. Hogan is a ‘Tackle Your Feelings’ Campaign Ambassador in collaboration with Rugby Players Ireland and a mental health advocate.

Before specializing in rugby Hogan played hockey with North Down Hockey club and her school, Down High School, where she was also Head Girl. Hogan played ladies gaelic football for the RGU club and captained the Down U14 ladies gaelic football team.
