= John Fogarty (rugby union, born 1977) =

Irish rugby union player and coach (b. 1977)

- Born: 18 October 1977 (age 49) Tipperary, Ireland
- Height: 1.78 m (5 ft 10 in)
- Weight: 102 kg (16.1 st; 225 lb)
- School: Rockwell College
- Notable relative: Denis Fogarty (brother)

Rugby union career
- Position: Hooker
Amateur team(s)
Years	Team	Apps	(Points)
- De La Salle
Senior career
Years	Team	Apps	(Points)
2000–2002	Munster	8	(0)
2003–2008	Connacht	107	(35)
2008–2010	Leinster	44	(10)
- Correct as of 18 September 2010
International career
Years	Team	Apps	(Points)
2006–2010	Ireland Wolfhounds	12	(15)
2010	Ireland	1	(0)
- Correct as of 12 June 2010
Coaching career
- Years: Team
- 2015–2019: Leinster (Scrum coach)
- 2020–: Ireland (Scrum coach)
- Correct as of 17 May 2019

John Fogarty (born 18 October 1977) is an Irish rugby union coach and former player who is now scrum coach for Ireland. During his playing career, he played as a hooker for three of the four Irish provincial teams; Munster, Connacht and Leinster. At international level, Fogarty played for Ireland A and won one cap for Ireland.

== Playing career ==
Fogarty hails from Tipperary and was educated in Rockwell College. Fogarty enjoyed a two-year spell with Munster, from 2000 to 2002, and after moving teams, made 107 appearances for Connacht. He played 80 times in the Celtic League and 27 times in the European Challenge Cup since his debut in the 2003–04 season. Fogarty captained Connacht for the 2006–07 Celtic League and Challenge Cup. Fogarty left Connacht for Leinster ahead of the 2008–09 season.

He was called up to the Ireland squad for the 2010 tour of New Zealand and Australia and earned his first test cap as a replacement in the 75th minute against the All Blacks on 12 June 2010. He was also part of an Ireland XV to play the New Zealand Māori team.

Fogarty announced his retirement in November 2010. He had been advised by doctors to do so, due to having suffered repeated concussions.

== Coaching career ==
After retirement, Fogarty became an Elite Player Development Officer with the province, working with the Leinster ‘A’ and also fulfilling the role of scrum coach with the Ireland Under-20s.

He was appointed as Leinster scrum coach in June 2015.
