= Rugby union in Ireland =

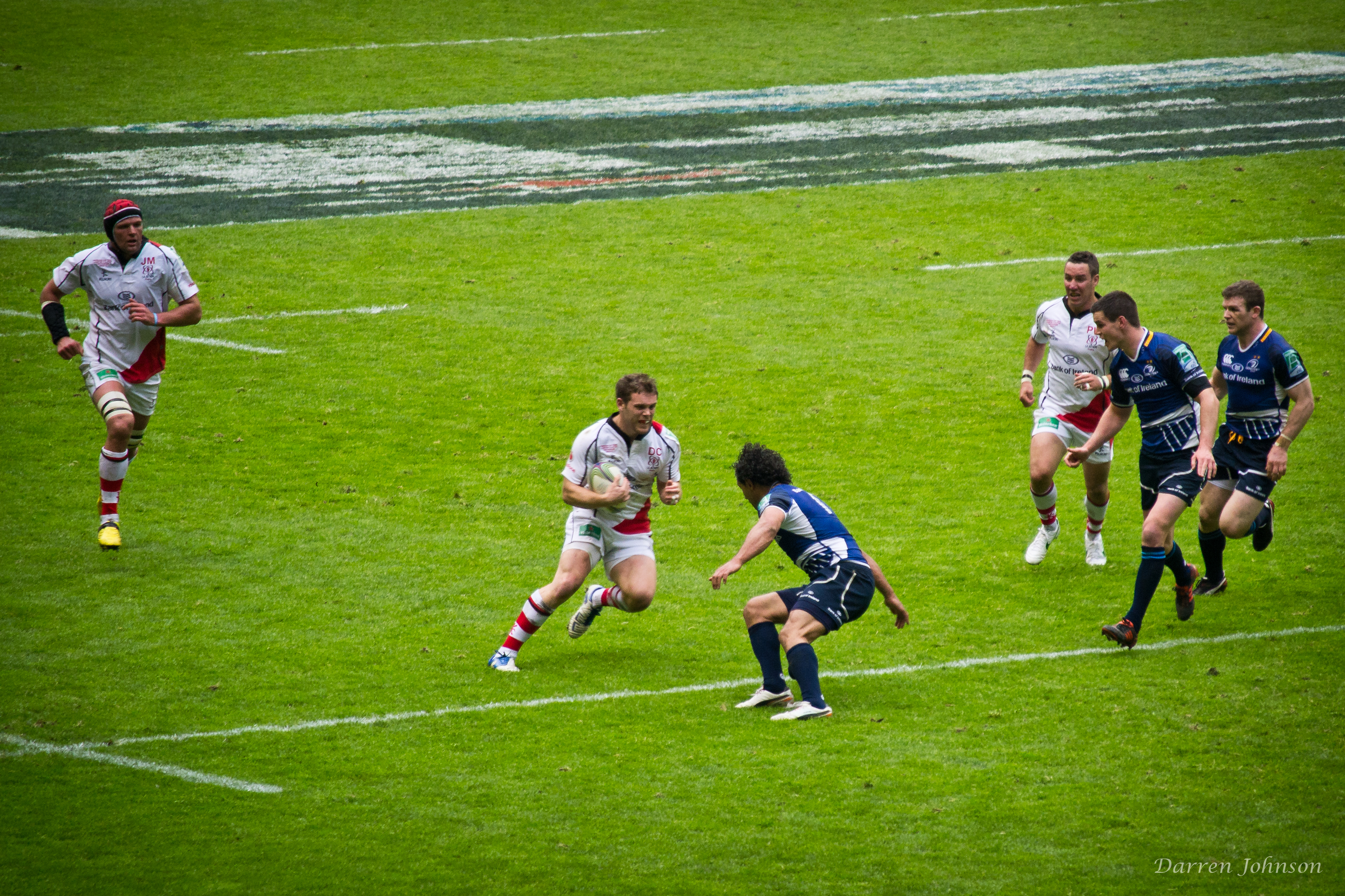
- Ulster (white) vs. Leinster (blue) in the 2012 Heineken Cup Final.
- Country: Ireland
- Governing body: Irish Rugby Football Union
- National team: Ireland
- First played: 1869, Dublin
- Registered players: 90,209
- Clubs: 56 clubs affiliated to the Ulster Branch; 71 clubs affiliated to the Leinster Branch; 59 clubs affiliated to the Munster Branch; 23 clubs affiliated to the Connacht Branch.

National competitions
- Rugby World Cup; Six Nations; Rugby World Cup Sevens

Club competitions
- United Rugby Championship; European Rugby Champions Cup; EPCR Challenge Cup; All-Ireland League

Rugby union is a popular team sport on the island of Ireland, organised on an all-Ireland basis, including players and teams from both the Republic of Ireland and Northern Ireland. Its governing body, the Irish Rugby Football Union (IRFU), was founded in 1875, making it the third oldest rugby union in the world after England's Rugby Football Union and the Scottish Rugby Union, which were both founded in 1871.

== Governing body ==
The Irish Rugby Football Union was formed in 1879, after the merger of the Irish Football Union, which controlled rugby in Leinster, Munster and parts of Ulster, and the Northern Football Union of Ireland, which controlled in the game in the Belfast area. As part of this amalgamation, the IRFU established three provincial branches to run the game in Leinster, Munster and Ulster; a fourth branch was founded for Connacht in 1885. The IRFU was a founding member of the International Rugby Board (now called World Rugby) in 1986. Despite the partition of Ireland in 1921, the IRFU continues to run the game on an all-island basis. Since 1995 the Ireland national team and the four provincial teams have been fully professional.

The Irish Women's Rugby Football Union (IWRFU) was founded in 1991. The IWRFU became affiliated to the IRFU in 2001, and was incorporated into the IRFU in 2008.

== International rugby ==
Ireland national teams at all levels represent the whole Island of Ireland, selecting players from both the Republic of Ireland and Northern Ireland.

=== Ireland Men ===
The Ireland national team is currently third in the World Rugby Rankings (as of October 2026). They compete in the annual Six Nations Championship and Nations Championship, the four-yearly Rugby World Cup, and various mid-year and autumn international matches.

Ireland's first international match was a 7-0 defeat by England in 1875. Ireland has appeared at every men's Rugby World Cup but never advanced beyond the quarter-final.

Ireland has won the Six Nations Championship (and its predecessor competitions) fifteen times, most recently in 2024, including four Grand Slams, the most recent being in 2023.

The national team has won several Triple Crowns and three Grand Slams and is able to play at a competitive level with the world's rugby giants, having beaten all including New Zealand in the last five years.

=== Ireland Women ===
The Ireland women's team made their international debut in 1993 and have competed in the Women's Rugby World Cup since its second edition in 1994, and the Women's Six Nations Championship (and its predecessor competitions) since 1996. It was initially organised by the Irish Women's Rugby Football Union (IWRFU), founded independently of the IRFU in 1993. The IWRFU became affiliated to the IRFU in 2001, and was fully merged into the IRFU in 2009.

Ireland hosted the 2017 Women's Rugby World Cup, and lost to Wales 17–27 in the eighth place play off.

The Ireland women's rugby union team compete in the Women's Six Nations, WXV Global Series ,

=== Development teams ===
As with all top-tier rugby nations, and many lower-tier countries, Ireland field an "A" national side, a second-level national selection primarily intended to develop younger talent for possible future duty on the senior national team. Since February 2010, the IRFU have rebranded the A side as Ireland Wolfhounds. The Wolfhounds generally play "A" teams of the other major European powers and senior sides of lower-tier nations. Ireland also field an occasional development team, Emerging Ireland, used to try out promising young players. The Ireland national under-20 rugby union team competes in the annual Six Nations Under 20s Championship and World Rugby U20 Championship tournaments. The Ireland national schoolboy rugby union team competes in the Rugby Europe Under-18 Championship.

IQ Rugby (formerly the Irish Exiles) is a development programme to identify potential Ireland players from the Irish diaspora.

=== Ireland Sevens ===
The Ireland national rugby sevens team competed in the World Rugby Sevens Series, the Rugby World Cup Sevens and at the Summer Olympics. Their highest ever finish in the SVNS was second 2023–24 SVNS league. They have made the semifinals of the Rugby World Cup Sevens twice, once in 1993 and in 2022, coming in third place in the latter. Their highest finish at the Summer Olympics was 6th at the 2024 Summer Olympics. In May 2025 the IRFU dismantled the programme at the end of the 2024/25 season, insisting the move was part of "a broader strategic effort to ensure the IRFU's long-term financial sustainability." This decision was met with widespread criticism.

== Provincial rugby ==
The four branches of the IRFU each organise a provincial team: Leinster, based at the RDS Arena in Dublin; Munster, based at Thomond Park in Limerick; Ulster, based at Ravenhill in Belfast; and Connacht, based at the Sportsgrounds in Galway. In the amateur era, they were representative teams, selected from the best club players in the province, and competed in the annual IRFU Interprovincial Championship, as well as playing against international touring teams. After rugby union was declared open to professionalism in 1995, they were developed into professional teams.

Today, men's provincial team compete in the United Rugby Championship (URC) alongside teams from Scotland, Wales, Italy and South Africa, and the European Rugby Champions Cup and EPCR Challenge Cup, which also include teams from France and England. All four provinces have been champions of the URC (or its predecessor competitions), Leinster ten times, most recently in 2026; Munster four times, most recently in 2023; Ulster once in 2006; and Connacht once in 2016. Leinster have won the Champions Cup four times, most recently in 2018; Munster twice, most recently in 2008; and Ulster once in 1999. Leinster have won the Challenge Cup once, in 2012.

To encourage the development of Irish talent, the provinces are allowed only three non-Irish-qualified players in their squads. Each province has an academy programme to develop young players from local schools and clubs to professional level. Regular internationals are signed on central contracts to the IRFU, meaning that they, and not the provinces, control when the players play and when they rest.

Each province also has a women's team which competes in the annual IRFU Women's Interprovincial Series. Irish women's teams compete in the Celtic Challenge tournament alongside teams from Scotland and Wales. In the first year, 2023, Ireland entered a Combined Provinces team. In the 2024 tournament, they entered two teams, the Wolfhounds, a combined Ulster-Leinster team, and the Clovers, a combined Munster-Connacht team.

== Club rugby ==
Since 1990, the top club sides in Ireland have competed in the All-Ireland League. It originally featured nineteen clubs in two divisions, and currently has fifty clubs in five divisions, 1A, 1B, 2A, 2B North and 2B South, with promotion and relegation between them, and with the provincial junior leagues. The Bateman Cup is played for annually by the winners of the provincial Senior Cups. The All-Ireland League Women's Division was founded in 1992 and has two divisions, 1A and 1B, containing twelve clubs. The provincial branches each organise a pyramid of league and cup competitions for both men's and women's teams.

== Schools rugby ==
Each province has a senior schools' tournament: the Leinster Schools Rugby Senior Cup; the Munster Schools Rugby Senior Cup; the Ulster Schools' Cup; and the Connacht Schools Rugby Senior Cup; and an under-15 tournament: the Leinster Schools Junior Cup; the Munster Schools Junior Cup; the Ulster Medallion Shield; and the Connacht Schools Junior Cup. Some major schools include, Blackrock College, Belvedere College, Campbell College, Christian Brothers College, Cork, Presentation Brothers College, Cork, Rockwell College, Royal Belfast Academical Institution, Methodist College Belfast, Terenure College,

== Demographics ==
=== Playing numbers ===
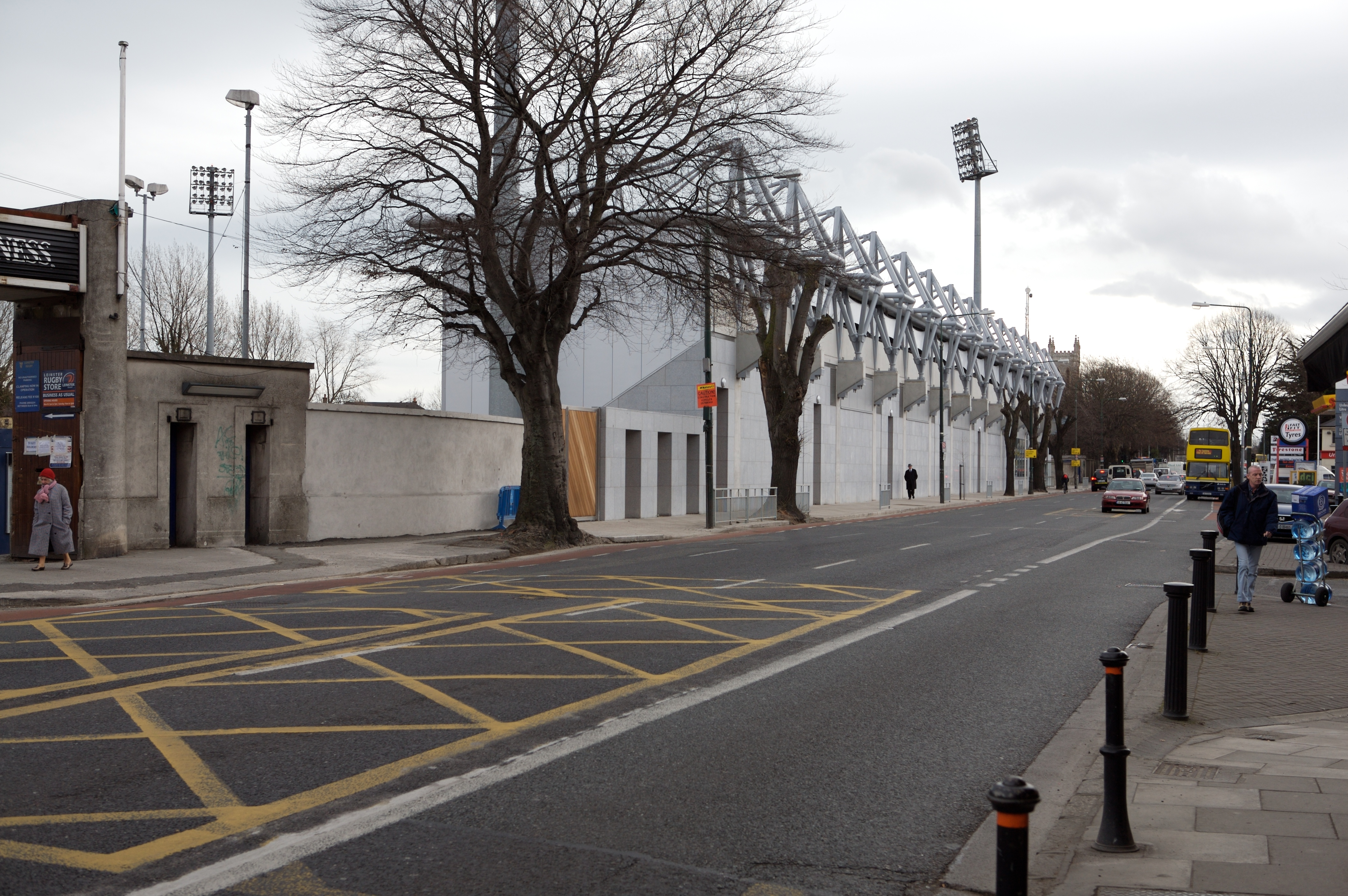
Outside Donnybrook Stadium in Dublin

The last report on the number of players playing rugby union conducted by World Rugby in 2019 showed 79,000 registered players (i.e. those registered with clubs, including the 21,000 adult players) and an overall total of 196,000, incorporating women’ players, schools, sevens etc.

=== Stadiums and attendance ===
The professional era and the advent of the competitions now known as United Rugby Championship and the European Rugby Champions Cup have seen rugby union become a major spectator sport in Ireland. European Cup games are generally well supported in all the provinces, with sell-outs the norm and massive crowds in Dublin's Lansdowne Road for quarter-final and semi-final matches. Ulster, Munster and Leinster have all won the Heineken Cup. In the past Ulster led the then-Celtic League attendances for three years in the row and Connacht, Munster and Leinster's crowds have grown year-on-year and with the later two setting new world records for province/club attendance.

Munster extensively renovated and expanded their traditional home of Thomond Park in a project that was completed in 2008. The Royal Dublin Society expanded their RDS Arena in the same time period, which prompted Leinster to make it their primary home while they were planning to expand their own traditional ground at Donnybrook. After the Donnybrook plans fell through, Leinster chose to remain at the RDS and in 2023 Leinster embarked on renovation plans to increase the capacity of the arena. Connacht completed ground expansion and renovation works in time for the 2011/2012 season with the construction of the Clan Terrace. And in 2014, Ulster completed the complete reconstruction of Ravenhill Stadium into a modern 18,000 capacity stadium. Munster are currently in the process of construing a new stand at their secondary home of Musgrave Park.

Before the opening of Aviva Stadium, Ireland international games sold out against all but the weakest opposition, and with the team playing at Croke Park during the reconstruction of Lansdowne Road, attendances regularly topped 80,000. However, the Aviva saw disappointing attendance during its first Tests in 2010, with no match selling out; media reports indicated that this was largely due to an IRFU ticketing strategy that made little sense in an uncertain economy. More recent Tests have seen crowds much closer to capacity, including sellouts or near-sellouts for all of Ireland's Six Nations home fixtures.

== History ==
=== Early years ===
Rugby clubs started to appear in Ireland in the mid-19th century. Dublin University Football Club is the oldest club in Ireland and was in existence by 1855, giving it a strong claim to being the world's oldest extant football club of any code. Other early clubs still in existence include Wanderers and Queen's University (both founded 1869), Lansdowne and Dungannon (both 1873) and University College Cork (1874). Ballinasloe, founded in 1875, merged with Athlone in 1994 to form Buccaneers; North of Ireland, founded in 1868, merged with Collegians in 1999 to form Belfast Harlequins.

The Irish Football Union was founded to govern the game in Leinster, Munster and parts of Ulster in December 1874. The Northern Football Union of Ireland was founded in January 1875, and controlled the game in the Belfast area The two unions amalgamated to form the IRFU in 1879, but not before the first inter-provincial match, between Ulster and Leinster, and Ireland's first international match against England, both in 1875. Ireland played their home games at Lansdowne Road in Dublin from 1878. The earliest competitions include the Ulster Schools' Cup, first held in 1876, and the Dublin Hospitals Rugby Cup, first held in 1881.

=== The amateur era ===
==== Club rugby ====
The Leinster Challenge Cup, later known as the Leinster Senior Cup, was first played in 1882, won by Dublin University. Senior Cup competitions followed in the other provinces: the Ulster Senior Cup was first won by North of Ireland in 1885; the Munster Senior Cup was first won by Bandon in 1886; and the Connacht Senior Cup was first won by Galway Town in 1896. Ulster was the first province to establish a provincial league, the Ulster Senior League, first won by Queen's in 1891. The Munster Senior League followed, first won by Garryowen in 1903; the Connacht Senior League was first won by Galwegians in 1926; the Leinster Senior League was not founded until 1971, and was first won by St. Mary's College in 1972. The All-Ireland League, featuring clubs from all four provinces, was founded in 1990, and was first won by Cork Constitution.

==== Provincial rugby ====
The IRFU Interprovincial Championship, between the provincial representative teams of Ulster, Leinster, Munster and Connacht, was first played in 1946, with Ulster being the first champions.

==== International rugby ====
The Home Nations Championship, ancestor of today's Six Nations Championship, was first played in 1883, between the Ireland, England, Scotland and Wales national teams. It became the Five Nations Championship in 1910 with the addition of France. Ireland first won the competition in 1926, jointly with Scotland. Their first outright win, and Grand Slam, came in 1948.

The Rugby World Cup was first held in 1987; Ireland were knocked out by Australia in the quarter-finals. In the 1991 Rugby World Cup, they again went out to Australia in the quarter-finals. In the final World Cup of the amateur era in 1995 they were knocked out in the quarter-finals once more, this time by France.

Ireland's most capped players of the amateur era include North of Ireland centre Mike Gibson (69), Ballymena lock Willie John McBride (63), Blackrock flanker Fergus Slattery (61), Dungannon lock Paddy Johns (59), and Old Wesley prop Philip Orr (58). Dublin University centre Brendan Mullin is Ireland's top try scorer of the amateur era with 17; Dolphin centre Michael Kiernan is top points scorer with 308.

=== The professional era ===
On 26 August 1995, rugby union was declared open to professionalism by the International Rugby Board. The IRFU had been opposed to this, and rugby in Ireland was poorly prepared for professionalism. Amid fears that Irish players could be signed up by English clubs, they began by offering contracts to international players.

==== Provincial rugby ====
Ireland rugby provinces

The Heineken Cup, now known as the European Rugby Champions Cup, was launched the same year. Ireland was given three places, and rather than enter clubs, the IRFU entered three of the four provincial teams, Munster, Ulster and Leinster. This led to the development of the provincial sides as professional teams, starting with match fees, and later contracts for provincial players. Ulster won the competition in 1999. Munster have won it twice, in 2006 and 2008, and Leinster four times, in 2009, 2011, 2012 (defeating Ulster), and 2018. In addition, Leinster won the European Challenge Cup in 2013 after having parachuted in from that season's Heineken Cup.

The Celtic League, featuring all four Irish provinces alongside teams from Scotland and Wales, was launched in 2001. The IRFU Interprovincial Championship was discontinued. The League expanded to a 22-match schedule in 2003, and for the first time the Irish provinces could operate as full-time professional teams, with players only rarely able to play for their clubs. The competition was renamed the Pro12 in 2011 with the addition of two teams from Italy; the Pro14 in 2017 with the addition of two teams from South Africa; and the United Rugby Championship in 2021 with the incorporation of four South African teams. Irish provinces have won the competition fourteen times in 24 seasons, and all four provinces have won it at least once. Leinster won the league in 2002, 2008, 2013, 2014, 2018, 2018–19, 2019–20 and 2020–21; Munster won in 2003, 2009, 2011 and 2023; Ulster won it in 2006; and Connacht won it in 2016.

==== International rugby ====
The Five Nations became the Six Nations Championship in 2000 with the addition of Italy. Ireland's first win of the professional era came with a Grand Slam in 2009. They won it again in 2014, 2015, 2018 and 2023 (the last two also being Grand Slams), and 2024. They went out in the quarter-finals of the World Cup in 1999 (to Argentina); 2003 (to France); at the group stage in 2007; and in the quarter-finals in 2011 (to Wales), 2015 (to Argentina), and 2019 (to New Zealand). After a victorious tour of New Zealand in 2022, Ireland went into the 2023 Rugby World Cup as one of the favourites, but went out in the quarter-finals to eventual runners-up New Zealand.

The old Lansdowne Road stadium was demolished in 2007, and the new Aviva Stadium, built on the same site, opened in 2010. In the meantime, home internationals were played at the Gaelic Athletic Association's stadium, Croke Park.

Ireland's most-capped players of the professional era include Leinster centre Brian O'Driscoll (133), Leinster prop Cian Healy (129), Munster out-half Ronan O'Gara (128), Ulster hooker Rory Best (123) and Leinster out-half Johnny Sexton (118). O'Driscoll is Ireland's record try scorer with 46; Sexton is their leading points scorer with 1108.

== Irish society and politics ==
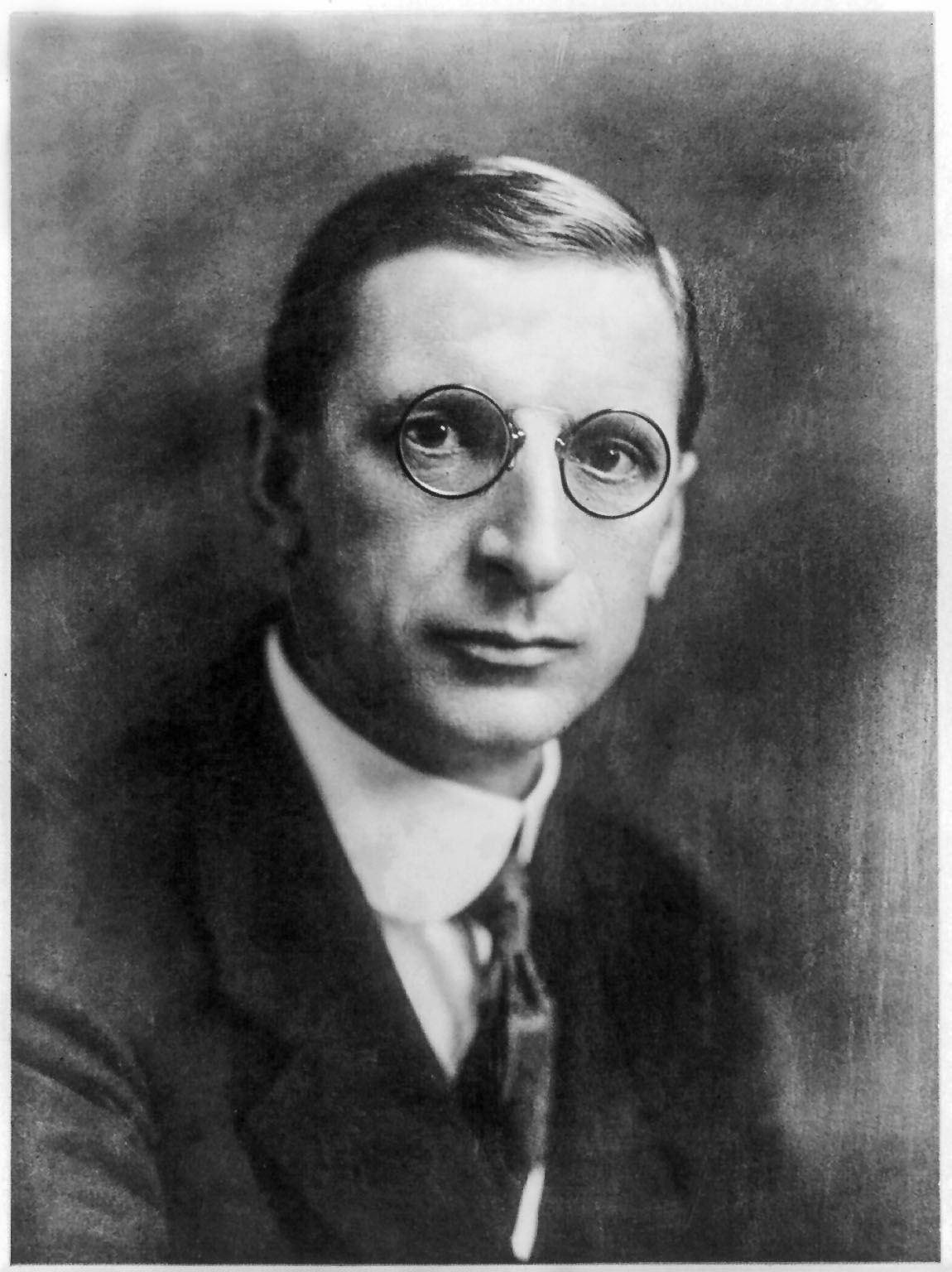
Irish President and Taoiseach Éamon de Valera played rugby at Blackrock & Rockwell colleges

Although rugby has traditionally been associated with the more anglophile elements of Irish society, it has not been without its following in the nationalist and republican communities. For example, the longest serving taoiseach, Éamon de Valera was a former player, and lifetime fan of the game. At the age of sixteen, De Valera won a scholarship to Blackrock College, County Dublin. It was at Blackrock College that de Valera began playing rugby. Later during his tenure at Rockwell College, he joined the school's rugby team where he played fullback on the first team, which reached the final of the Munster Senior Cup. De Valera was a close friend of the Ryan brothers at Rockwell who played on Ireland's Triple Crown-winning team in 1899. De Valera remained a lifelong devotee of rugby, attending numerous international matches up to and towards the end of his life despite near blindness.

Other notable politicians, from very different backgrounds, who have played rugby for Ireland include Tyrone Howe (a former Unionist Party councillor), Trevor Ringland (a Unionist Parliamentary candidate) and Dick Spring (former Tánaiste and Labour Party TD).

Nowadays, rugby is played by both nationalists and unionists. Historically, it tended to be popular with different social groups in different parts of Ireland, although generally speaking it is regarded as a middle-class sport in Ireland and further afield. In Limerick city, it is enjoyed across the social spectrum, while in Leinster and Cork City it remains very much a middle-class game. Rugby traditionally is not as prevalent in Connacht, although it is less defined there by social class. In Northern Ireland it is traditionally played in mainly-middle-class Protestant grammar schools. The changing climate in Northern Ireland politics has altered this perceived tradition with the introduction of rugby into an increasing number of Roman Catholic grammar and secondary schools which were previously exclusively associated with Gaelic games.

=== Rugby and the GAA ===
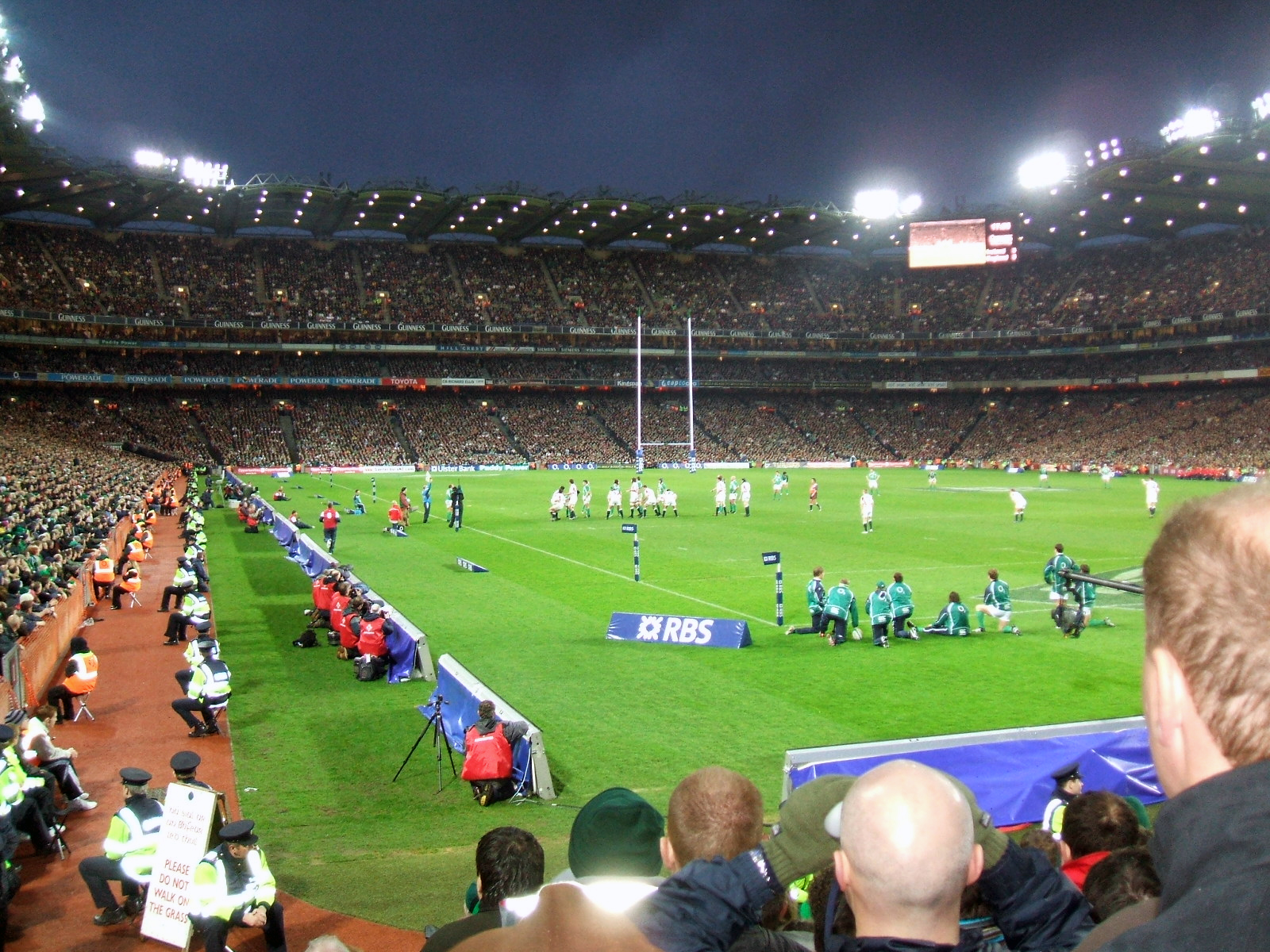
Croke Park hosting a match between Ireland and England

During the late 19th century, in response to the perceived encroachment of English sports, including rugby, Irish nationalist Michael Cusack set up the Gaelic Athletic Association (GAA). Rule 42 of the GAA's Official Guide prohibited the playing of non-Gaelic games in GAA stadiums, including rugby until it was lifted in 2007. However, the rule was relaxed while Lansdowne Road was being redeveloped, and rugby was played in Croke Park including a match between Leinster and Munster that broke the club rugby attendance record; see List of non-Gaelic games played in Croke Park for exceptions to this rule.

The first game to take place under the relaxed Rule 42 took place on 11 February 2007. It was a Six Nations Championship rugby match between Ireland and France which Ireland lost 17–20. The following match against England generated some controversy, since it involved the playing of God Save the Queen at a ground where British soldiers had killed fourteen spectators on Bloody Sunday, 1920. There was a small protest by Republican Sinn Féin outside the ground which included a man holding a sign saying No to foreign games while ironically wearing a Celtic FC tracksuit.

A Heineken Cup semi-final was played in Croke Park on 2 May 2009, when Leinster defeated Munster 25–6. The attendance of 82,208 set a new world record attendance for a club rugby union game. Leinster broke this record at Croke Park again in 2024, drawing a capacity 82,300 crowd for an Investec Champions Cup semi-final against Northampton Saints.
