= Sophie Barrett =

- Born: 27 January 2004 (age 22)
- School: Erne Integrated College

Rugby union career
- Position: Prop
Amateur team(s)
Years	Team	Apps	(Points)
2023-24	Railway Union RFC	6	(10)
2024-25	Enniskillen RFC	5	(15)
2025-	Cooke RFC	5	(10)
- Correct as of 6 December 2025
Provincial / State sides
Years	Team	Apps	(Points)
2022-	Ulster	12	(10)
2023	Combined Provinces	1	(0)
2024-	Wolfhounds	18	(15)
2025-26	Clovers	8	(10)
- Correct as of 29 August 2026
International career
Years	Team	Apps	(Points)
2023-25	Ireland u21	6	(15)
2026-	Ireland	2	(5)
- Correct as of 31 October 2026

Sophie Barrett is an Irish rugby union player, who plays as a prop for Cooke RFC in the All-Ireland League, Enniskillen RFC in the Ulster Premiership, Ulster in the IRFU Women's Interprovincial Series, the Wolfhounds in the Celtic Challenge, and the Ireland women's national team.

She was educated at Erne Integrated College, Enniskillen, where she was co-captain of the team that won the Ulster Girls' Schools Cup in 2022. She was named Girls' Schools Player of the Year in the Ulster Rugby Awards for 2021–22, and was nominated for Young Women's Player of the Year. She was a member of the IRFU's first National Women's Talent Squad in 2022.

In the inaugural Celtic Challenge in 2023, she was selected for the Combined Irish Provinces team. She joined Railway Union RFC in the All-Ireland League for the 2023–24 season, where she switched from back row to tighthead prop. She played that position for the Wolfhounds in the 2023–24 Celtic Challenge, even when Ireland international Christy Haney was available. She was named Young Women's Player of the Year in the Ulster Rugby Awards for 2023–24.

She was part of the Ireland squad for the inaugural Six Nations Women's U21 Series in 2024, and was voted the tournament's Most Valuable Player. She scored two tries in three games in the 2025 series. She was first named in the Ulster Squad for the 2024 IRFU Women's Interprovincial Series. She moved to Cooke RFC in the All-Ireland League for the 2025–26 season, while also playing for Enniskillen RFC in the Ulster Premiership and All-Ireland Junior Cup.

Having been part of Ireland squads since 2024, she was awarded a national contract by the IRFU in 2026. She marked her senior debut for Ireland with a try against Japan on 3 October 2026 during the WXV Global Series.
