= Celtic Challenge =

Women's rugby union tournament for regional teams

- Current season, competition or edition: 2025–26 Celtic Challenge
- Sport: Rugby union
- Founded: 2023; 3 years ago
- First season: 2023
- No. of teams: 6
- Country: Ireland; Wales; Scotland
- Most recent champions: (Ireland) Wolfhounds (3rd title) (2025–26)
- Most titles: (Ireland) Wolfhounds (3 titles)
- Website: https://celticrugbycomp.com/

The Celtic Challenge is an annual cross-border women's rugby union, launched in 2023. Designed to develop players for the Celtic nations of Ireland, Scotland and Wales, the inaugural pilot edition featured a double round robin between three teams, one from each participating union. From 2024 the competition will involve six teams, two from each participating union. Beginning with the 2024–25 season, the competition will maintain its six-team setup, transitioning into a full home-and-away round-robin format. The winners will be determined by standings at the end of the season.

The three participating unions fund the competition, with further development funding from World Rugby.

== Teams ==
=== Current teams ===
Team	Established	Location (Note: Team base location)	Seasons	Titles (last)	Runners-up
(Wales) Brython Thunder	2023	Llanelli & West Wales	3	– (N/A)	– (N/A)
(Ireland) Clovers	2023	Munster & Connacht	3	– (N/A)	2 (2024–25, 2025-26)
(Scotland) Edinburgh Rugby	2023	Edinburgh	3	– (N/A)	1 (2023–24)
(Scotland) Glasgow Warriors	2023	Glasgow	3	– (N/A)	– (N/A)
(Wales) Gwalia Lightning	2023	Cardiff & South Wales	3	– (N/A)	– (N/A)
(Ireland) Wolfhounds	2023	Leinster & Ulster	3	3 (2023–24, 2024–25, 2025-26)	– (N/A)

=== Previous teams ===
Nine clubs have been involved in the league since its inception in the 2023 season. Below, all former clubs are listed along with the number of full seasons they've competed in.

Team	Area	Established	Disbanded	Seasons	Titles	Runners-up
(Ireland) Combined Provinces XV	Ireland	2023	2023	1	1 (2023)	– (N/A)
(Scotland) The Thistles	Scotland	2023	2023	1	– (N/A)	1 (2023)
Wales Development XV	Wales	2023	2023	1	– (N/A)	– (N/A)

== Champions ==
The winners and runners up of each edition are listed below:

Season	Winner	Runner-up
2023	(Ireland) Combined Provinces XV	(Scotland) The Thistles
2023–24	(Ireland) Wolfhounds	(Scotland) Edinburgh Rugby
2024–25	(Ireland) Wolfhounds	(Ireland) Clovers
2025–26	(Ireland) Wolfhounds	(Ireland) Clovers

=== Summary of winners ===
#	Team	Champions	Years as champions	Runners-up	Years as runners-up
1	(Ireland) Wolfhounds	3	2023–24, 2024–25, 2025-26	0	
2	(Ireland) Combined Provinces XV	1	2023	0	—

== History ==
=== 2023 competition ===
The first edition consisted of six matches in a double round robin:

The competition involved 3 teams:

- 1 team from Ireland, the Combined Provinces XV.
- 1 team from Wales, the Wales Development XV.
- 1 team from Scotland, the Thistles.

=== 2023–24 competition ===
In November 2023 it was announced that for the second season, the competition would expand to six teams and twenty one matches.

In December it was announced that the 2023–24 competition will run from December to March 2024 and will be contested by six teams:

- 2 teams from Ireland, the Clovers and the Wolfhounds.
- 2 teams from Wales, Brython Thunder and Gwalia Lightning.
- 2 teams from Scotland, Edinburgh Rugby and Glasgow Warriors

The teams will play each other once, either home or away, across five rounds before play-offs to decide a champion in March 2024.

=== 2024-25 competition ===
The six teams from the 2023–24 season returned for the 2024–25 season. The competition was expanded into a full double round-robin, in effect creating a Women's Celtic League competition. As a result, the end-of-season play-off was removed and standings will be decided by table standings at the end of the season. Each team will play 5 home matches and five away matches.

=== 2025-26 competition ===
The six teams from the second and third Celtic Challenge seasons returned for the 2025–26 season. The format was tweaked for the fourth consecutive season; the competition remained expanded into a full double round-robin, but an end-of-season play-off segment was reintroduced for the top four teams in the ladder, with the top two teams taking home advantage into the semi-finals and the final held in a predetermined venue. Each team will play 5 home matches and five away matches in the league stage, while those qualified for the playoffs will play either 1 or 2 further matches. With twelve matchdays, the season is the longest Celtic Challenge to date.
