= Wolfhounds (rugby union) =

- Union: IRFU
- Founded: 2023; 3 years ago
- Ground(s): Donnybrook Stadium, Dublin; Ravenhill, Belfast
- Coach: Neill Alcorn
- League: Celtic Challenge
- 2024–25: 1st (Champions) (2nd title)

First match
- Wolfhounds 21–15 Clovers (Musgrave Park, Cork); 29 December 2023

Largest win
- Wolfhounds 102-0 v Edinburgh. Dublin; 8 March 2025

Largest defeat
- Wolfhounds 10-31 v Clovers. Dublin; 28 December 2024

The Wolfhounds are an Irish women's regional rugby union team representing the provinces of Leinster and Ulster. Founded in 2023, the team competes in the Celtic Challenge, the international competition between Scottish, Welsh and Irish regional teams. They are funded by the Irish Rugby Football Union (IRFU).

== History ==
The IRFU announced the creation of the Wolfhounds and Clovers women's teams in December 2023. They replaced a Combined Provinces team, which competed in and won the inaugural Celtic Challenge season in 2023. With only two places available for Irish teams in the competition, the IRFU opted to merge its provinces: the Wolfhounds represent the provinces of Leinster and Ulster. Their shirt features the colours of both provinces, Leinster's blue and Ulster's white. The IRFU stated that the two teams may select players from the other two provinces to balance the teams and cover all positions.

The Wolfounds' first match took place on 29 December at Musgrave Park in Cork, the Wolfhounds won 21–15. Undefeated, the team were crowned champions at the end of the 2023-24 Celtic Challenge season. Fourteen players were called up for the 2024 Six Nations.

The Wolfhounds won the Celtic challenge for a second time in the 2023-24 season, losing only one game.

== Overall record ==
Complete as of end of regular season 2025-26, 9 March 2026

=== By opponent ===
Opponent	Played	Won	Drawn	Lost	Win %	F	A	Tries
(Ireland) Clovers	7	6	0	1	85.71%	228	135	36
(Wales) Gwalia Lightning	5	5	0	0	100%	221	73	33
(Scotland) Glasgow Warriors Women	5	5	0	0	100%	246	92	34
(Wales) Brython Thunder	7	6	0	1	85.71%	251	39	38
(Scotland) Edinburgh Rugby Women	6	5	1	0	91.67%	260	84	44
Overall	29	26	1	2	91.38%	1141	382	177

=== By season ===
Season	Played	Won	Drawn	Lost	F	A	Points	Position
2023 Celtic Challenge	did not take part							
2023-2024 Celtic Challenge	7	6	1	0	238	130	32	Winners
2024-2025 Celtic Challenge	10	9	0	1	462	125	44	Winners
2025-2026 Celtic Challenge	12	11	0	1	517	166	45*	Winners
Overall	29	26	1	2	1141	382	121	-

- includes points from regular season only.

=== Honours ===
Celtic Challenge :

- Winners (3) 2023-24, 2024-25, 2025-26
