= Clovers (rugby union) =

Irish regional rugby union team

- Founded: 2023; 3 years ago
- Coach: Denis Fogarty
- League: Celtic Challenge
- 2025–26: 2nd

First match
- Wolfhounds 21–15 Clovers (Musgrave Park, Cork); 29 December 2023

The Clovers are an Irish women's regional rugby union team representing the provinces of Connacht and Munster. Founded in 2023, the team competes in the Celtic Challenge, the international competition between Scottish, Welsh and Irish regional teams. They are funded by the IRFU.

== History ==
The IRFU announced the creation of the Clovers and Wolfhounds women's teams in December 2023. They replaced a Combined Provinces team, which competed in and won the inaugural Celtic Challenge season in 2023. With only two places available for Irish teams in the competition, the IRFU opted to merge its provinces: the Clovers represent the provinces of Connacht and Munster. The IRFU stated that the two teams may select players from the other two provinces to balance the teams and cover all positions.

Their first squad was unveiled on 20 December 2023. Denis Fogarty, a former professional player, was named head coach. He is assisted by former international Niamh Briggs.

The Clovers' first match took place on 29 December at Musgrave Park in Cork, they played the Wolfhounds, who won 21–15. They finished their first season in 4th place.

For their second season in the Celtic Challenge, Denis Fogarty was remained as head coach. He was assisted by former internationals Larissa Muldoon and Leah Lyons. They finished the 2024–25 season in second place, 2 points behind the champions.

== Season summaries ==
Season Summaries
	League			
Season	Competition	Final position	Points	–
2023–24	Celtic Challenge	3rd	17	–
2024–25	Celtic Challenge	2nd	42	Runners-up
2025–26	Celtic Challenge	2nd	39	Runners-up

Gold background denotes champions
Silver background denotes runners-up
