= Brython Thunder =

Welsh women's rugby union team

- Founded: 2023; 3 years ago
- Ground(s): Parc y Scarlets; Eirias Stadium
- Coach: Ashley Beck
- Captain: Gwen Crabb
- League: Celtic Challenge
- 2025–26: 4th

Brython Thunder are a Welsh women's rugby union team based in Llanelli. Founded in 2023, the team competes in the Celtic Challenge, the international competition between Scottish, Welsh and Irish regional teams.

== History ==
The Welsh Rugby Union (WRU) announced the creation of two teams that would compete in the Celtic Challenge in December 2023, the teams were Gwalia Lightning and Brython Thunder. They replaced the Wales Development XV team that competed in the inaugural Celtic Challenge season.

Ashley Beck was appointed head coach for the 2023–24 season. He remained as head coach for the 2024–25 season.

The first match in the history of the team took place on 30 December 2023, against Gwalia Lightning. The match was won by Gwalia Lightning. The team won three of their seven matches and finished fifth in the table. They finished the 2024–25 in 4th place, behind Gwalia Lightning and the Irish teams of The Clovers (2nd) and The Wolfhounds (1st).

On 24 April 2025 WRU announced their plans to revamp their 2 teams, inviting regions and universities to bid for new teams that would replace both Brython Thunder and Gwalia Lightning. The plan was later postponed "due to the ongoing transformation in the men's game" meaning both teams would compete again in the 2025–26 season.
