= Denis Fogarty =

- Born: 16 July 1983 (age 43) County Tipperary, Ireland
- Height: 1.85 m (6 ft 1 in)
- Weight: 106 kg (16.7 st; 234 lb)
- School: Rockwell College
- Notable relative: John Fogarty(brother)

Rugby union career
- Position: Hooker
Amateur team(s)
Years	Team	Apps	(Points)
2002–2012	Cork Constitution		
Senior career
Years	Team	Apps	(Points)
2004–2012	Munster	98	(30)
2012–2013	Aurillac	25	(5)
2013–2015	Agen	37	(15)
2015–2016	Provence	3	(0)
- Correct as of 5 May 2016
International career
Years	Team	Apps	(Points)
2008–2009	Ireland A	7	(10)
- Correct as of 13 July 2015

Denis Fogarty (born 16 July 1983) is an Irish former rugby union player who played at hooker for Munster, Aurillac, Agen and Provence. He has also represented Ireland at schoolboy, U21 and 'A' level. He was educated at Rockwell College. In May 2016, Fogarty was forced to retire from rugby after suffering a recurrence of a shoulder injury.

== Munster ==
Fogarty made his debut for Munster against The Borders in the Celtic League in November 2004. When Frankie Sheahan sustained an injury, Fogarty was called up onto the bench for Munster's 2006 Heineken Cup Final against Biarritz Olympique in May 2006. He was part of the Munster A team that won the 2011–12 British and Irish Cup. His last game for Munster was the away play-off semi-final against Ospreys on 11 May 2012, which Munster lost 45–10.

== Aurillac ==
It was announced on 25 April 2012 that Fogarty would be joining French Pro D2 side Stade Aurillacois Cantal Auvergne, better known as Aurillac. Fogarty was named in the Pro D2 team of the season for 2012–13.

== Agen ==
Fogarty will join French Pro D2 side SU Agen Lot-et-Garonne, better known as Agen, on a two-year contract at the start of the 2013–14 season.

== Provence Rugby ==
Fogarty currently played for French Pro D2 side Provence Rugby.

== Ireland ==
Fogarty first represented Ireland A in the 2008 Churchill Cup. He was part of the Ireland A team that won the 2009 Churchill Cup, defeating England Saxons 49–22 in the final. He also played for Ireland A against Tonga in November 2009.

== Honours ==
=== Munster ===
- Heineken Cup:
  - Winner (1): 2005–06
- Celtic League:
  - Winner (2): 2008–09, 2010–11

=== Munster A ===
- British and Irish Cup:
  - Winner (1): 2011–12

=== Ireland A ===
- Churchill Cup:
  - Winner (1): 2009
