= Edinburgh Rugby Stadium =

Rugby stadium in Scotland

Hive Stadium
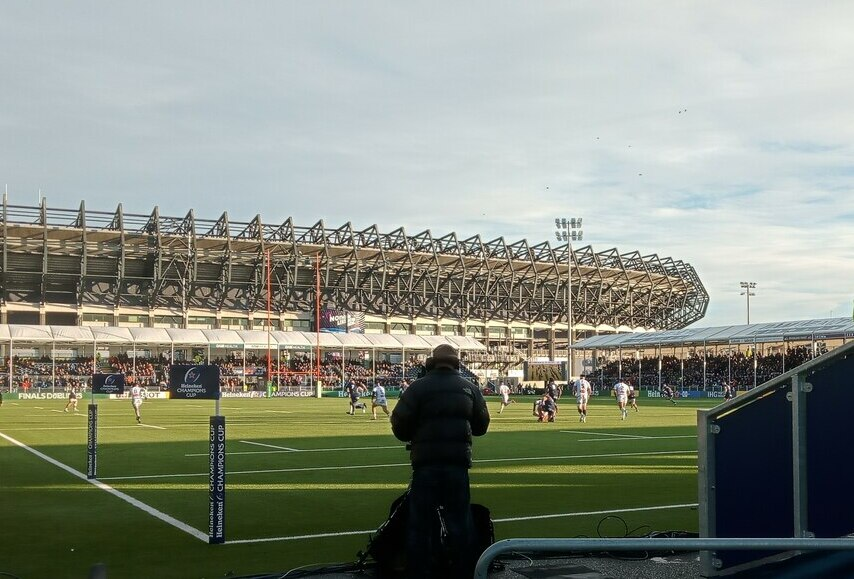
- A pitchside view of the Hive Stadium with Murrayfield in the background

- Location within Edinburgh
- Location: Edinburgh, Scotland
- Coordinates: 55°56′30″N 3°14′39″W
- Owner: Scottish Rugby Union
- Operator: Edinburgh Rugby
- Capacity: 7,800
- Surface: Artificial turf
- Public transit: Haymarket; Murrayfield Stadium

Construction
- Groundbreaking: 2019; 7 years ago
- Opened: 2021; 5 years ago
- Cost: £5.7 million
- Architect: Holmes Miller
- Main contractor: WH Malcolm

Tenant
- Edinburgh Rugby

The Edinburgh Rugby Stadium, officially known as the Hive Stadium for sponsorship reasons, is a rugby union stadium in Edinburgh, Scotland. It is the home of Edinburgh Rugby, one of Scotland's two professional rugby clubs. The stadium is located next to Murrayfield Stadium and Murrayfield Ice Rink, beside the Water of Leith adjacent to the Saughtonhall and Balgreen neighbourhoods. It has a capacity of 7,800, and was completed on 16 February 2021.

== Structure and facilities ==
The stadium consists of four stands.

- North Stand: 2,047 (Main stand)
- East Stand: 1,480
- South Stand: 2,704
- West Stand: 1,564

There is seating for disabled people in all areas of the ground with a dedicated disabled terrace in the North Stand.

== Opening ==
Prior to the opening of the stadium, Edinburgh Rugby had no dedicated home of its own, and played many of its home fixtures in the Murrayfield stadium, the capacity of which far outstripped Edinburgh Rugby's requirements, and which affected the atmosphere for both fans and players. Completed during the COVID-19 period where no fans could attend matches, Edinburgh played their first match at the new stadium on 11 September 2021, facing Premiership Rugby side Newcastle Falcons in a pre-season friendly.

== Transport ==
=== Buses ===
The stadium is served by Lothian Buses (via Corstorphine Road (A8) and Gorgie Road (A71).

=== Tram ===
The Murrayfield Stadium stop for Edinburgh Trams is located to the south-east of Edinburgh Rugby stadium, adjacent to Murrayfield Stadium's entrance turnstiles on Roseburn Street. Balgreen stop is also within walking distance to the south-west.

=== Rail ===
Although the major railway line into Edinburgh runs adjacent to the stadium, the closest railway station is Haymarket, a mile to the east.

Interchange with Edinburgh Trams is available at Haymarket, Edinburgh Gateway and Edinburgh Park stations. From the city centre, Edinburgh Waverley is a short walk from the St Andrew Square tram stop.
