= Musgrave Park, Cork =

Rugby football stadium in Ireland

Musgrave Park
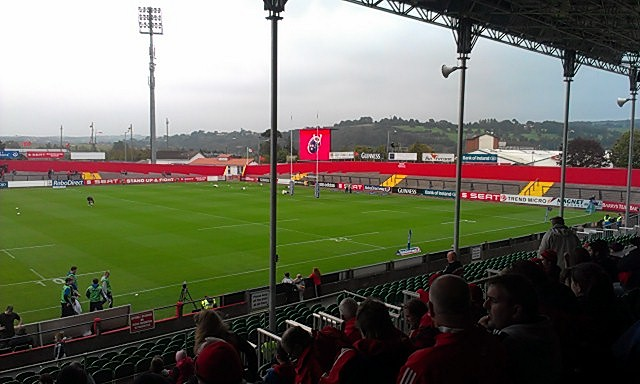
- Musgrave Park stands prior to renovation, September 2013
- Interactive map of Musgrave Park
- Former names: Irish Independent Park (sponsorship; 2015-2020)
- Location: Cork
- Coordinates: 51.8808°N 8.4718°W
- Owner: Irish Rugby Football Union
- Capacity: 8,008
- Surface: Artificial turf
- Public transit: Cork railway station Pearse Road / O'Growney Crescent bus stop

Construction
- Opened: Original: 1940; After redevelopment: 2015

Tenants
- Dolphin RFC; Sundays Well RFC; Munster Rugby

Musgrave Park, known as Virgin Media Park for sponsorship reasons, is a rugby football stadium in the city of Cork, Ireland. The ground is situated on Pearse Road in Ballyphehane. The ground is named after Jimmy Musgrave, a past-president of the Irish Rugby Football Union. Owned by the Irish Rugby Football Union (IRFU), it is primarily used by Dolphin RFC, Sundays Well RFC, and Munster Rugby.

== History and development ==
The ground was first purchased by the Munster Branch of the IRFU in the late 1930s, and in use by the early 1940s. Named for Jimmy Musgrave, a past-president of the IRFU, this early ground incorporated a small pavilion between two pitches. Terracing and seating were later added. Dolphin and Sunday's Well rugby clubs were tenants from the outset, though the ground also sometimes hosted provincial and international games. The latter included a number of notable Munster Rugby performances against touring international teams, including Australia (in 1967), the All Blacks (in 1973), and Australia (in 1992) when the then world-champions were defeated at the ground.

By the early 21st century, the ground consisted of four terraces, one stand, three tribunes, a jogging track, and two VIP stands on the west side. This configuration provided a seating capacity of 3,450, with terracing giving a total capacity of approximately 9,000.

It was announced in March 2010 that a new all-seated west stand, would bring capacity to over 12,500, however by February 2011 it was reported that this work would not go ahead - due to difficulty raising funding. Instead a 4,000 seat temporary stand was erected in the summer of 2011. Later in 2011 the old seated west stand was demolished and replaced by a temporary structure, giving an overall capacity of 10,000 with 4,000 seats.

In March 2013 it was announced that a new permanent 3,300 seated west stand would be built. It would incorporate changing, medical, media and function rooms. The east terrace would also have a roof added as part of this development. To fund this development a 1.1 acre strip of land to the east of the site was made available for sale. When complete, the development would provide a ground capacity of 10,000 in total, phasing in from a capacity of approximately 8,000 from the initial reopening in January 2015. This €3.2m investment and work took place between June 2014 and January 2015, and included a new west stand seating 3,500, with the east terrace being covered from endline to endline.

Following a naming-rights deal with Independent News & Media, upon the planned reopening in early 2015, the ground was referred to as Irish Independent Park. This naming rights agreement ended in November 2020. A similar naming rights deal was agreed with Virgin Media Ireland in early 2024.

== Use ==
=== Rugby ===
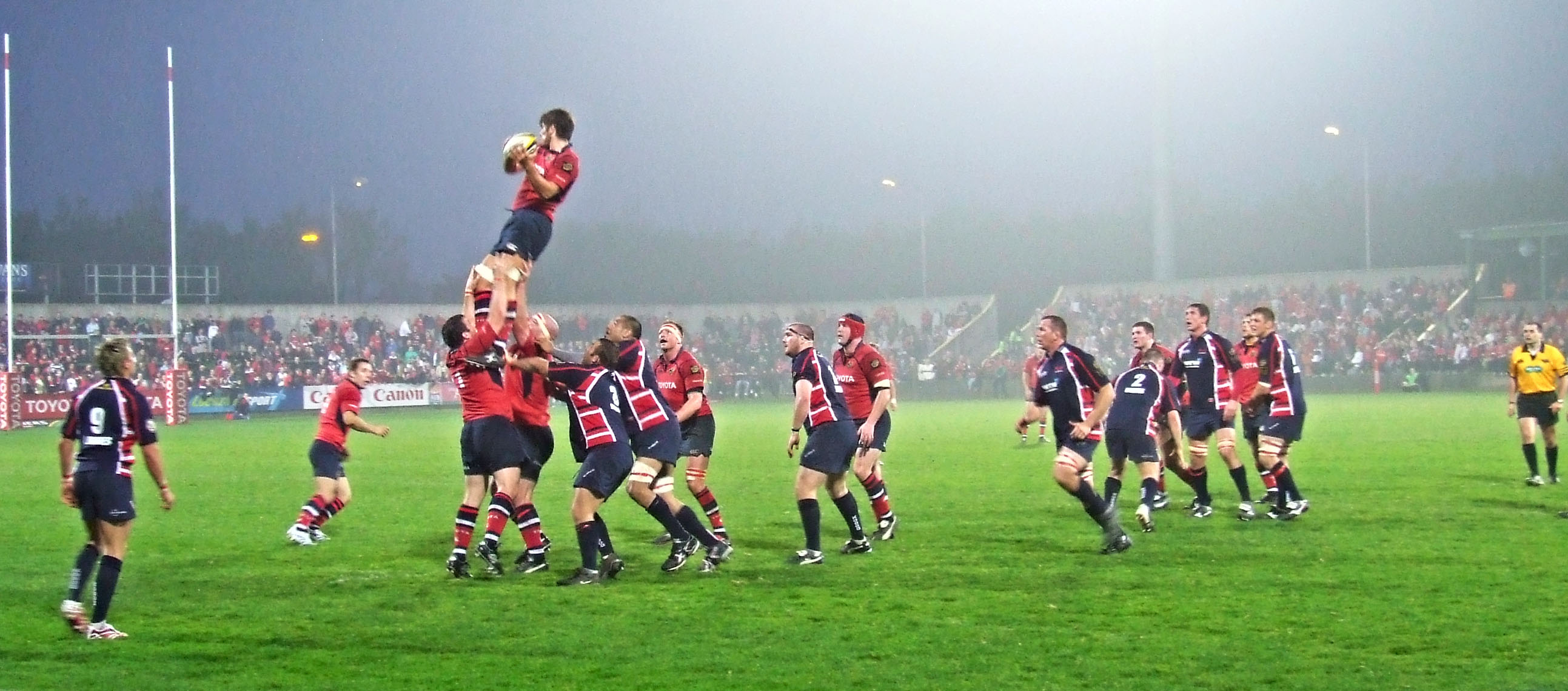
A line-out during a rugby match between Munster and Scarlets at Musgrave Park

Musgrave Park is home to Dolphin RFC and Sundays Well RFC. Each club has their own pitch on the east side of the main stadium. The stadium hosts some home fixtures of the United Rugby Championship's Munster Rugby. However Thomond Park, Limerick is the venue for all European Rugby Champions Cup games.

The ground has been used for some rugby internationals, including Ireland's Women's XV games in the Women's 6 Nations, Ireland Men's A (Wolfhounds) games, and Ireland under-20 Men's team matches. It hosted games during the 2019, 2020, 2022, 2023 and 2024 Six Nations Under 20s Championship.

The stadium also hosts locally important games - such as finals for amateur cup competitions and schools rugby.

=== Other sports ===
In September 1991 League of Ireland club Cork City F.C. played a league game at Musgrave Park against Shamrock Rovers and the following Wednesday Cork City drew 1–1 with FC Bayern Munich in a UEFA Cup game played at the ground.

=== Concerts ===
Other events also take place at the venue, with for example a concert by Il Divo in June 2014, and a series of gigs by George Ezra, The Coronas, Liam Gallagher, Lauryn Hill and others during June 2019. Florence and the Machine also played there in June 2023.

On 20 June 2024, Take That performed their first ever show in Cork at Musgrave Park as part of This Life on Tour.

== See also ==
- Stadiums of Ireland
