= 2024 Laurence Olivier Awards =

Annual UK theatre awards

- Date: 14 April 2024
- Location: Royal Albert Hall
- Hosted by: Hannah Waddingham
- Most wins: Sunset Boulevard (7)
- Most nominations: Sunset Boulevard (11)

Television/radio coverage
- Network: ITV (television); Magic (radio)

The 2024 Laurence Olivier Awards were held on 14 April 2024 at the Royal Albert Hall. Hannah Waddingham returned to host.

== Event calendar ==
- 30 June 2023: Ceremony date set for 14 April 2024 and venue confirmed as Royal Albert Hall.
- 23 January 2024: Hannah Waddingham announced to return as host.
- 21 February 2024: Industry Recognition Award recipients announced.
- 27 February 2024: Eligibility cut-off.
- 12 March 2024: Nominations announcement by Beverley Knight.
- 14 April 2024: Award ceremony held.

== Winners and nominees ==
The nominations were announced in 26 categories on 12 March 2024.

Best New Play	Best New Musical
Dear England by James Graham – National Theatre Olivier and Prince Edward Theatre; The Hills of California by Jez Butterworth – Harold Pinter Theatre; The Motive and the Cue by Jack Thorne – National Theatre Lyttleton and Noël Coward Theatre; Till the Stars Come Down by Beth Steel – National Theatre Dorfman	Operation Mincemeat – Fortune Theatre; The Little Big Things – @sohoplace; Next to Normal – Donmar Warehouse; A Strange Loop – Barbican Theatre
Best Revival	Best Musical Revival
Vanya – Duke of York's Theatre; The Effect – National Theatre Lyttelton; Macbeth – Donmar Warehouse; Shirley Valentine – Duke of York's Theatre	Sunset Boulevard – Savoy Theatre; Groundhog Day – The Old Vic; Guys and Dolls – Bridge Theatre; Hadestown – Lyric Theatre
Best Entertainment or Comedy Play	Best Family Show
Stranger Things: The First Shadow by Kate Trefry (based on original text by Matt Duffer, Ross Duffer, Jack Thorne and Trefry) – Phoenix Theatre; Accidental Death of an Anarchist by Dario Fo and Franca Rame, adapted by Tom Basden – Lyric Hammersmith and Theatre Royal Haymarket; Stephen Sondheim's Old Friends by Stephen Sondheim – Gielgud Theatre; Vardy v Rooney: The Wagatha Christie Trial adapted by Liv Hennessy – Ambassadors Theatre	Dinosaur World Live – Regent's Park Open Air Theatre; Bluey's Big Play – Royal Festival Hall at Southbank Centre; The House with Chicken Legs – Queen Elizabeth Hall at Southbank Centre; The Smeds and The Smoos – Lyric Theatre
Best Actor	Best Actress
Mark Gatiss as John Gielgud in The Motive and the Cue – National Theatre Lyttleton and Noël Coward Theatre; Joseph Fiennes as Gareth Southgate in Dear England – National Theatre Olivier and Prince Edward Theatre; James Norton as Jude St. Francis in A Little Life – Harold Pinter Theatre and Savoy Theatre; Andrew Scott as Performer in Vanya – Duke of York's Theatre; David Tennant as Macbeth in Macbeth – Donmar Warehouse	Sarah Snook as Performer in The Picture of Dorian Gray – Theatre Royal Haymarket; Laura Donnelly as Veronica and Joan in The Hills of California – Harold Pinter Theatre; Sophie Okonedo as Medea in Medea – @sohoplace; Sarah Jessica Parker as Karen Nash, Muriel Tate and Norma Hubley in Plaza Suite – Savoy Theatre; Sheridan Smith as Shirley in Shirley Valentine – Duke of York's Theatre
Best Actor in a Musical	Best Actress in a Musical
Tom Francis as Joe Gillis in Sunset Boulevard – Savoy Theatre; David Cumming as Charles Cholmondeley and Others in Operation Mincemeat – Fortune Theatre; Daniel Mays as Nathan Detroit in Guys and Dolls – Bridge Theatre; Charlie Stemp as Bobby Child in Crazy for You – Gillian Lynne Theatre	Nicole Scherzinger as Norma Desmond in Sunset Boulevard – Savoy Theatre; Natasha Hodgson as Ewen Montagu and Others in Operation Mincemeat – Fortune Theatre; Caissie Levy as Diana Goodman in Next to Normal – Donmar Warehouse; Marisha Wallace as Miss Adelaide in Guys and Dolls – Bridge Theatre
Best Actor in a Supporting Role	Best Actress in a Supporting Role
Will Close as Harry Kane in Dear England – National Theatre Olivier and Prince Edward Theatre; Paul Hilton as Peter Stockmann in An Enemy of the People – Duke of York's Theatre; Giles Terera as Montrellous in Clyde's – Donmar Warehouse; Luke Thompson as Willem Ragnarsson in A Little Life – Harold Pinter Theatre and Savoy Theatre; Zubin Varla as Harold Stein in A Little Life – Harold Pinter Theatre and Savoy Theatre	Haydn Gwynne as Stanley Baldwin in When Winston Went to War with the Wireless – Donmar Warehouse (posthumously) (Note: Posthumous.); Lorraine Ashbourne as Aunty Carol in Till the Stars Come Down – National Theatre Dorfman; Priyanga Burford as Aslaksen in An Enemy of the People – Duke of York's Theatre; Gina McKee as Pippa Grange in Dear England – National Theatre Olivier and Prince Edward Theatre; Tanya Reynolds as Mei in A Mirror – Almeida Theatre and Trafalgar Theatre
Best Actor in a Supporting Role in a Musical	Best Actress in a Supporting Role in a Musical
Jak Malone as Hester Leggett, Bernard Spilsbury and Others in Operation Mincemeat – Fortune Theatre; Cedric Neal as Nicely Nicely Johnson in Guys and Dolls – Bridge Theatre; David Thaxton as Max von Mayerling in Sunset Boulevard – Savoy Theatre; Jack Wolfe as Gabriel "Gabe" Goodman in Next to Normal – Donmar Warehouse	Amy Trigg as Agnes in The Little Big Things – @sohoplace; Grace Hodgett-Young as Betty Schaefer in Sunset Boulevard – Savoy Theatre; Zoë Roberts as Johnny Bevan, Ian Fleming and Others in Operation Mincemeat – Fortune Theatre; Eleanor Worthington Cox as Natalie Goodman in Next to Normal – Donmar Warehouse
Best Director	Best Theatre Choreographer
Jamie Lloyd for Sunset Boulevard – Savoy Theatre; Stephen Daldry and Justin Martin for Stranger Things: The First Shadow – Phoenix Theatre; Rupert Goold for Dear England – National Theatre Olivier and Prince Edward Theatre; Sam Mendes for The Motive and the Cue – National Theatre Lyttelton and Noël Coward Theatre	James Cousins and Arlene Phillips for Guys and Dolls – Bridge Theatre; Fabian Aloise for Sunset Boulevard – Savoy Theatre; Ellen Kane and Hannes Langolf for Dear England – National Theatre Olivier and Prince Edward Theatre; Mark Smith for The Little Big Things – @sohoplace; Susan Stroman for Crazy for You – Gillian Lynne Theatre
Best Set Design	Best Costume Design
Miriam Buether for scenic designing and 59 Productions for video designing Stranger Things: The First Shadow – Phoenix Theatre; Nathan Amzi and Joe Ransom for video designing and Soutra Gilmour for scenic designing Sunset Boulevard – Savoy Theatre; Bunny Christie for scenic designing Guys and Dolls – Bridge Theatre; Es Devlin for scenic designing and Ash J. Woodward for video designing Dear England – National Theatre Olivier and Prince Edward Theatre	Marg Horwell for The Picture of Dorian Gray – Theatre Royal Haymarket; Deborah Andrews and Bunny Christie for Guys and Dolls – Bridge Theatre; Ryan Dawson Laight for La Cage aux Folles – Regent's Park Open Air Theatre; Hugh Durrant for Peter Pan – London Palladium
Best Lighting Design	Best Sound Design
Jack Knowles for Sunset Boulevard – Savoy Theatre; Jon Clark for Dear England – National Theatre Olivier and Prince Edward Theatre; Jon Clark for Stranger Things: The First Shadow – Phoenix Theatre; Paule Constable for Guys and Dolls – Bridge Theatre	Adam Fisher for Sunset Boulevard – Savoy Theatre; Paul Arditti for Stranger Things: The First Shadow – Phoenix Theatre; Dan Balfour and Tom Gibbons for Dear England – National Theatre Olivier and Prince Edward Theatre; Gareth Fry for Macbeth – Donmar Warehouse
Outstanding Musical Contribution
Alan Williams for music directing and music supervising Sunset Boulevard – Savoy Theatre; Tom Brady for arranging and music supervising and Charlie Rosen for orchestrating Guys and Dolls – Bridge Theatre; Matt Brind for arranging, music supervising and orchestrating Just for One Day – Old Vic; Joe Bunker for music directing and Steve Sidwell for orchestrating Operation Mincemeat – Fortune Theatre
Best New Dance Production	Outstanding Achievement in Dance
La Ruta by Gabriela Carrizo, Nederlands Dans Theater – Sadler's Wells; Broken Chord by Gregory Maqoma and Thuthuka Sibisi – Sadler's Wells; The Rite of Spring by Seeta Patel – Sadler's Wells; Time Spell by Michelle Dorrance, Jillian Meyers and Tiler Peck – Sadler's Wells	Isabela Coracy for performing in Nina: By Whatever Means, Cassa Pacho's Ballet Black: Pioneers – Barbican Theatre; Jonzi D for artistic directing Breakin' Convention 2023: International Festival of Hip Hop Dance Theatre – Sadler's Wells; Rhiannon Faith for her community-focused conception of Lay Down Your Burdens – The Pit at Barbican
Best New Opera Production	Outstanding Achievement in Opera
Innocence, Royal Opera – Royal Opera House; Blue, English National Opera – London Coliseum; Picture a Day Like This, Royal Opera – Royal Opera House, Linbury Theatre; The Rhinegold, English National Opera – London Coliseum	Antonio Pappano for music directing the Royal Opera House; Marina Abramović for conceiving and designing 7 Deaths of Maria Callas – London Coliseum; Belarus Free Theatre Company for King Stakh's Wild Hunt – Barbican Theatre
Outstanding Achievement in an Affiliate Theatre
Sleepova – Bush Theatre; Blue Mist – Jerwood Upstairs, Royal Court; A Playlist for the Revolution – Bush Theatre; The Swell – Orange Tree Theatre; The Time Machine: A Comedy – Park Theatre
Industry Recognition Award
Sylvia Addison; Vereen Irving; Robert Israel; Richard Walton; Susan Whiddington

== Productions with multiple wins and nominations ==
=== Multiple wins ===
The following 5 productions received multiple awards:

- 7: Sunset Boulevard
- 2: Dear England, Operation Mincemeat, Stranger Things: The First Shadow, The Picture of Dorian Gray

=== Multiple nominations ===
The following 17 productions received multiple nominations:

- 11: Sunset Boulevard
- 9: Dear England, Guys and Dolls
- 6: Operation Mincemeat
- 5: Stranger Things: The First Shadow
- 4: Next to Normal
- 3: A Little Life, Macbeth, The Little Big Things, The Motive and the Cue
- 2: An Enemy of the People, Crazy for You, Shirley Valentine, The Hills of California, The Picture of Dorian Gray, Till the Stars Come Down, Vanya

== Presenters and performers ==
Presenters were announced on 4 April to include:

Presenters
Name(s)	Role
Anna Maxwell Martin and Michael Sheen	Best Revival
Carlos Acosta	Best New Dance Production
Henry Lewis and Jonathan Sayer	Best Family Show
Lucian Msamati and Anjana Vasan	Best Actor in a Supporting Role and Best Actress in a Supporting Role
Rosalind Plowright	Outstanding Achievement in Opera and Best New Opera Production
Anthony Van Laast	Outstanding Achievement in Dance
Ryan Calais Cameron	Outstanding Achievement in Affiliate Theatre
Billy Crudup and Denise Gough	Best Actor and Best Actress
Patricia Clarkson and Brian Cox	Best New Play
Lenny Henry	Best Director
Cara Delevingne and Luke Treadaway	Best Musical Revival and Outstanding Musical Contribution
Freema Agyeman and Dominic West	Best New Entertainment or Comedy Play
Indhu Rubasingham	Best Lighting Design and Best Sound Design
Edward Enninful	Best Set Design and Best Costume Design
Michael Ball	Best Choreographer
Ruth Jones and Beverley Knight	Best Actor in a Supporting Role in a Musical and Best Actress in a Supporting Role in a Musical
Adrian Lester and Georgina Onuorah	Best Actor in a Musical and Best Actress in a Musical
Richard E. Grant and Michelle Visage	Best New Musical

Performers
Name(s)	Role
Hannah Waddingham and Joe Stilgoe	"Anything Goes" (opening number)
Marisha Wallace and cast of Guys and Dolls	"Take Back Your Mink"
Jonny Amies, Ed Larkin and the cast of The Little Big Things	"The World Is Waiting for You" / "The Little Big Things"
Tom Francis and the cast of Sunset Boulevard	"Sunset Boulevard"
The cast of Hadestown	"Wait for Me"
Michael R. Jackson	"Memory Song" from A Strange Loop
Caissie Levy, Eleanor Worthington Cox and Jack Wolfe from Next to Normal	"I Miss the Mountains" / "Superboy and the Invisible Girl" / "I'm Alive"
The cast of Operation Mincemeat	"Born to Lead"
Joseph Fiennes from Dear England and NT ensemble celebrating 60 years of the National Theatre	"You'll Never Walk Alone"

== See also ==
- 77th Tony Awards
