= Rupert Goold =

English theatre director

Rupert Goold CBE
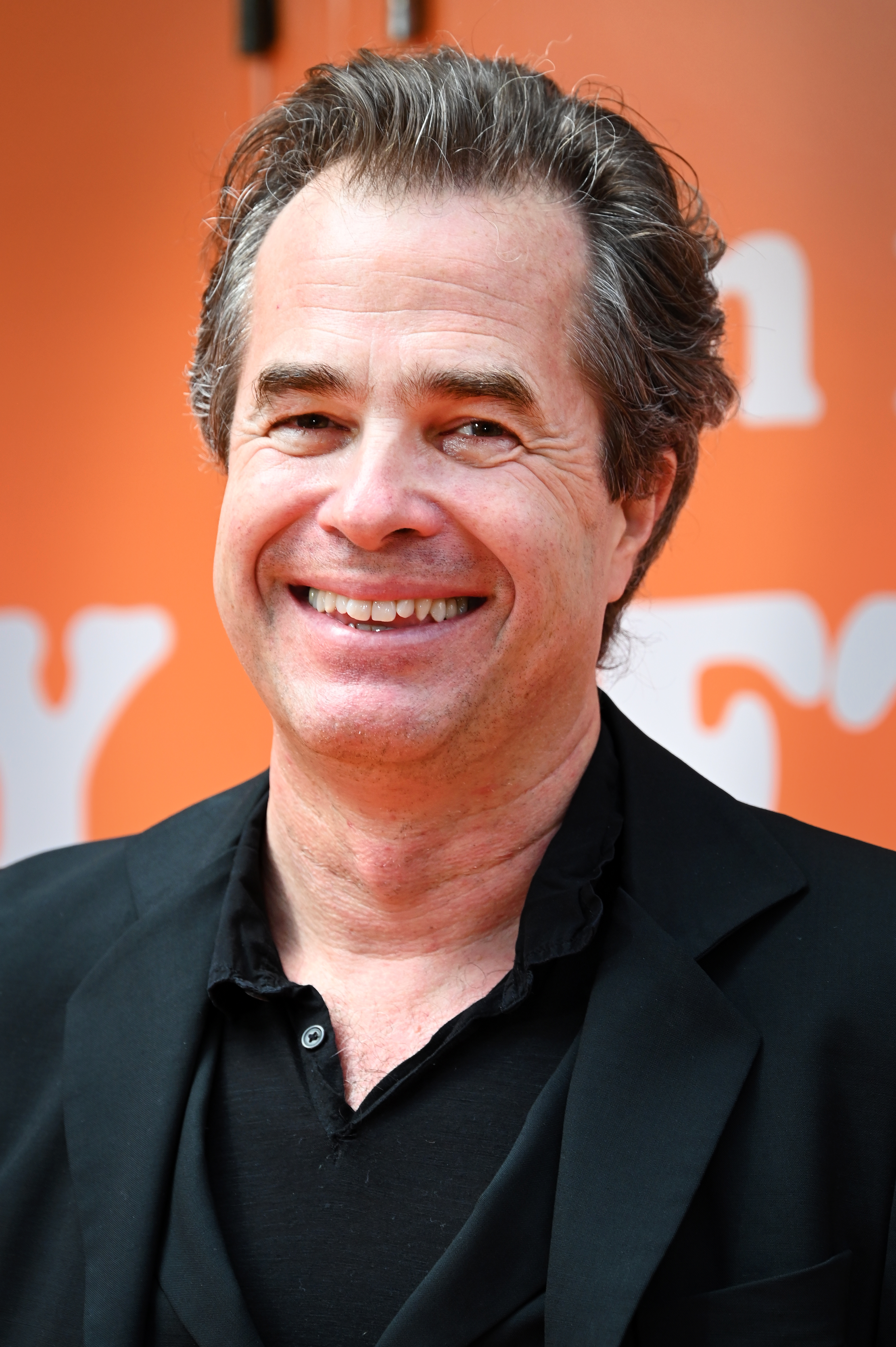
- Goold in 2026
- Born: 18 February 1972 (age 54); Highgate, London, England
- Education: Trinity College, Cambridge; New York University
- Occupation: Theatre director
- Years active: 1995–present
- Spouse: Kate Fleetwood (m. 2001)
- Children: 2

Rupert Goold (born 18 February 1972) is an English director who works primarily in theatre. He is the artistic director of The Old Vic, and was the artistic director of Headlong Theatre Company (2005–2013) and the Almeida Theatre (2013–2026). Since 2010, Goold has been an associate director at the Royal Shakespeare Company. He was appointed Commander of the Order of the British Empire (CBE) in the 2017 for services to drama.

Goold is known for his extensive work in theatre. For his work in the West End he won two Laurence Olivier Awards for Best Director for Macbeth (2008) and Enron (2010). He was Olivier-nominated for King Charles III (2015), Ink (2018), and Dear England (2024). He received Tony Award for Best Direction of a Play nominations for King Charles III (2016) and Ink (2019). He made his directorial film debut with True Story (2015).

== Life and career ==
=== Early years and education ===
Goold was born in Highgate, England, a suburb of north London. His father was a management consultant, and his mother was an author of children's books. He attended the independent University College School, graduated from Trinity College, Cambridge, in 1994 with a First in English literature and studied performance studies at New York University on a Fulbright Scholarship. He was trainee director at Donmar Warehouse for the 1995 season, and assisted on productions including 'Art' and Speed-the-Plow in the West End.

=== Career ===
Goold was artistic director of the Royal and Derngate Theatres in Northampton from 2000 to 2005. Prior to that, he was an associate at the Salisbury Playhouse in 1996–97. In addition to his work as a director he has co-authored three adaptations for the stage. Goold directed Sir Patrick Stewart (whom he had previously directed as Prospero, and later in Richard II) as Macbeth in his acclaimed Minerva Studio staging of Macbeth at the Chichester Festival Theatre in May 2007.

In September 2007, the production transferred to the Gielgud Theatre in London, then the Brooklyn Academy of Music, New York and then to the Lyceum Theater on Broadway. At the 2007 Evening Standard Theatre Awards, Macbeth won two awards: Stewart won the Best Actor Award, while Goold won The Sydney Edwards Award for Best Director. It also won Goold a 2008 Olivier Award for Best Director. He says he was not concerned with thoughts of a career anti-climax. "I came home to an empty house after the Olivier Awards, clutching my trophy for Best Director and I realised that I'd peaked. It was now going to be downhill all the way. But I still felt quite comfortable with the realisation that nothing could get better after this." He later directed a 2010 BBC 4 television film version of Macbeth using Soviet-era Russian-type uniforms and weapons.

In 2008, he directed the UK premiere of Stephen Adly Guirgis's The Last Days of Judas Iscariot and a radical re-interpretation of Pirandello's Six Characters in Search of an Author at the Chichester Festival which he co-authored with Ben Power. This production subsequently transferred to the West End and toured the UK and later Australia. In 2009 he directed a hugely acclaimed West End revival of Lionel Bart's Oliver! Produced by Cameron Mackintosh, Goold recreated Sam Mendes' direction for the London Palladium production, which was nominated for three Olivier Awards. In 2009, Goold directed a revival of Shakespeare's King Lear at the Young Vic. Goold set his Lear in Northern England during the 1970s, and approached the play with a drastically different view, and as a result this production received mixed reviews. In 2009, he again won Best Director at the Evening Standard Awards for ENRON. His opera credits include productions at Batignano Opera Festival and Garsington.

In the following years he directed a string of plays for the Almeida Theatre, which include the musical American Psycho (2013), the new play King Charles III (2014), the revivals Medea (2015) and Richard III (2016), as well as the new play Ink (2017). Goold returned to Broadway with the transfer of King Charles III. He earned a nomination for the Tony Award for Best Direction of a Play. The following year he directed the musical transfer, American Psycho based on the 1991 novel of the same name by Bret Easton Ellis. In 2019 he directed the Broadway transfer for the James Graham play Ink about the rise of Rupert Murdoch which ran at the Samuel J. Friedman Theatre. Goold received his second nomination for the Tony Award for Best Direction. That same year he directed the Almeida Theatre production of The Hunt (2019) starring Tobias Menzies by David Farr which was based on the 2012 film of the same name directed Thomas Vinterberg. In 2021 he directed the musical revival of Spring Awakening on the West End.

In 2022 he directed the Peter Morgan play Patriots about the rise of Vladimir Putin and the Elton John musical Tammy Faye about the American evangelist Tammy Faye Messner. The following year he directed the play Dear England about the England football manager Gareth Southgate and Cold War a musical based on the 2018 film of the same name directed by Paweł Pawlikowski, the former of which earned Goold a nomination for the Olivier Award for Best Director. In 2024 he directed the New York transfer of The Hunt which ran at St. Ann's Warehouse.

In February 2025, Goold directed William Shakespeare's Hamlet for the Royal Shakespeare Company starring Luke Thallon, Jared Harris, Nancy Carroll, Elliot Levey and Anton Lesser. The production will also tour the UK in 2026. It is the second production of the play that Goold has directed following his 2005 production at the Royal & Derngate.

On 24 November 2024, Goold was named as the next artistic director of The Old Vic taking over from Matthew Warchus in September 2026. His first season was announced on 10 November 2026, which includes his productions of William Shakespeare's Henry V starring Damian Lewis and a revival of the Stephen Sondheim musical Assassins.

== Personal life ==
Goold is married to actress Kate Fleetwood. The couple met while working together on a production of Romeo and Juliet. They have one son, Raphael, and a daughter, Constance.

== Works ==
=== Theatre ===
Directing

Year	Name	Theatre	Ref.
1997	Travels with My Aunt	Salisbury Playhouse / UK Tour	—N/a
1997	The End of the Affair	Salisbury Playhouse / Bridewell Theatre	—N/a
1998	Romeo and Juliet	UK Tour	—N/a
1998	Dancing at Lughnasa	Salisbury Playhouse	—N/a
1998	Summer Lightning	Salisbury Playhouse	—N/a
1999	Habeas Corpus	Salisbury Playhouse	—N/a
1999	The Colonel Bird	Gate Theatre	—N/a
1999	Broken Glass	Salisbury Playhouse/ Watford Palace Theatre	—N/a
2000	Gone To LA	Hampstead Theatre	—N/a
2001	Privates on Parade	New Vic Theatre	—N/a
2001	Scaramouche Jones	International Tour	—N/a
2001	The Wind in the Willows	Birmingham Rep	—N/a
2002	Arcadia	Northampton	—N/a
2002	Betrayal	Northampton	—N/a
2003	Waiting for Godot/ The Weir	Northampton	—N/a
2003	Sunday Father	Hampstead Theatre	—N/a
2003	Othello	Northampton/ Greenwich Theatre	—N/a
2004	Insignificance	Northampton	—N/a
2004	Summer Lightning	Northampton	—N/a
2005	Hamlet	Northampton	—N/a
2005	Speaking Like Magpies	RSC	—N/a
2006	The Tempest	RSC	—N/a
2006	Restoration	Headlong/ Bristol Old Vic: UK Tour	—N/a
2006	Faustus	Headlong/ Hampstead Theatre	—N/a
2007	The Glass Menagerie	Apollo Theatre	
2007	Macbeth	Chichester Festival Theatre/ West End/ NYC	—N/a
2007	Rough Crossings	Headlong: Lyric Hammersmith/ Birmingham Rep, Liverpool Everyman/ WYP	—N/a
2008	The Last Days of Judas Iscariot	Headlong: Almeida Theatre	—N/a
2008	Six Characters in Search of an Author	Headlong: Chichester / West End	—N/a
2008	No Man's Land	Gate Theatre, Dublin/West End	—N/a
2008	King Lear	Headlong: Liverpool Everyman/Young Vic	—N/a
2009	Oliver!	Theatre Royal Drury Lane	—N/a
2009	ENRON	Minerva Theatre / Royal Court Theatre	—N/a
2010	Romeo and Juliet	Royal Shakespeare Theatre	—N/a
2010	Earthquakes in London	National Theatre	—N/a
2011	The Merchant of Venice	Royal Shakespeare Theatre	—N/a
2014	The Merchant of Venice	Almeida Theatre	
2011	Decade	Headlong	—N/a
2012	The Effect	National Theatre	—N/a
2013	American Psycho	Almeida Theatre	—N/a
2016	American Psycho	Gerald Schoenfeld Theatre	—N/a
2026	American Psycho	Almeida Theatre	
2014	King Charles III	Almeida Theatre	
2014	King Charles III	Wyndham's Theatre	
2015	King Charles III	UK tour	
2014	Made in Dagenham	Adelphi Theatre	
2015	Medea	Almeida Theatre	—N/a
2016	Richard III	Almeida Theatre	
2017	Albion	Almeida Theatre	
2017	Ink	Almeida Theatre	
2017	Ink	Duke of York's Theatre	
2019	Ink	Samuel J. Friedman Theatre	
2019	Shipwreck	Almeida Theatre	
2019	The Hunt	Almeida Theatre	
2024	The Hunt	St. Ann's Warehouse	
2021	Spring Awakening	Almeida Theatre	
2022	The 47th	The Old Vic	—N/a
2022	Patriots	Almeida Theatre	—N/a
2023	Patriots	Noël Coward Theatre	—N/a
2022	Tammy Faye	Almeida Theatre	—N/a
2024	Tammy Faye	Palace Theatre, Broadway	—N/a
2023	Women, Beware the Devil	Almeida Theatre	—N/a
2023	Dear England	National Theatre	—N/a
2023	Dear England	Prince Edward Theatre	
2025	Dear England	National Theatre	
2023	Cold War	Almeida Theatre	
2025	Hamlet	Royal Shakespeare Theatre	—N/a
2026	Hamlet	UK tour	
2026	Dog Day Afternoon	August Wilson Theatre	
2027	Henry V	The Old Vic	
2027	Assassins	The Old Vic	

Writing

- The End of the Affair (1997) – a play with music, adapted with Caroline Butler, from the novel by Graham Greene. The first production included music played by a pianist at the side of the stage, underscoring the text with some period songs sung by the cast. Goold and Butler removed the music from later productions and the play was published without musical interpolation in 2001.
- Faustus (2004) – adapted with Ben Power from Dr Faustus by Christopher Marlowe
- Six Characters in Search of an Author (2008) – adapted with Ben Power from the play by Luigi Pirandello

=== Film and television ===
Directing

- Macbeth (TV, 2010)
- Richard II (TV, 2012)
- True Story (2015)
- King Charles III (TV, 2017)
- Judy (2019)
- Dear England (TV, 2026 Episode 1)

== Award and nominations ==
Award	Year	Category	Nominated work	Result	Ref.
British Academy Television Award	2013	Best Single Drama	The Hollow Crown: Richard II	Nominated	
British Academy Television Award	2018	Best Single Drama	King Charles III	Nominated	
Laurence Olivier Award	2008	Best Director	Macbeth	Won	
Laurence Olivier Award	2010	Best Director	Enron	Won	
Laurence Olivier Award	2015	Best Director	King Charles III	Nominated	
Laurence Olivier Award	2018	Best Director	Ink	Nominated	
Laurence Olivier Award	2024	Best Director	Dear England	Nominated	
Tony Awards	2016	Best Direction of a Play	King Charles III	Nominated	
Tony Awards	2019	Best Direction of a Play	Ink	Nominated	
