= Pippa Grange =

British author and psychologist

- Education: Loughborough University; Victoria University, Australia
- Scientific career
- Workplaces: The Football Association
- Thesis: The Stress Is Unbearable, I Hope it Lasts: Case Studies in Reversal Theory (2005)

Pippa Grange is a British applied psychologist and author. She was Head of People and Team Development at the Football Association until the end of 2019. She is the founder of the consultancy Bluestone Edge.

== Early life and education ==
Grange was born in Harrogate, Yorkshire. She studied sports science at Loughborough University and played in the National Basketball League, before moving to Australia in 1996, where she undertook a doctorate in psychology.

== Career ==
In 1996, Grange moved to Adelaide on a one-year contract to work in basketball development. Grange completed a Vincent Fairfax Fellowship at the St James Ethics Centre. She earned a doctorate in Applied Psychology at Victoria University, Australia. Her thesis, The Stress Is Unbearable; I Hope It Lasts, looked at the relationship between stress and performance in sport.

Grange was appointed general manager of culture and leadership of the Australian Football League Players Association by Brendon Gale. In 2008 she criticised the Australian Football League for abandoning well known AFL player Ben Cousins during his struggles with drug addiction. She founded the consultancy Bluestone Edge in 2010. They worked with the AFL football and rugby leagues, as well as the olympic team. In 2012 she helped the Australian Swim Team after their failure at the Olympics. She was chair of the AFL Responsible Alcohol Steering Committee and the Inclusion and Diversity campaign to raise acceptance of homosexuality.

In 2014, Grange published Ethical Leadership in Sport: What’s your ENDgame?, a guidebook to navigating leadership positions in sports. Grange was appointed Head of People and Team Development for the Football Association in November 2017. She was responsible for developing the psychological resilience of the players. Grange was based at St George's Park National Football Centre and worked with the men's and women's teams, coaches and staff.

On 27 July 2019, it was announced that Grange would leave her role at The FA by the end of 2019 to focus on 'the broadening definition of success and winning in sport, especially for woman and girls'

== In popular culture ==
In the premiere run of Dear England, James Graham's 2023 play telling the story of Gareth Southgate's time as manager of the England men's side, Grange was played by Gina McKee. The role was played by Jodie Whittaker in the 2026 TV adaptation.
