= Alfie Middlemiss =

English actor and boxer

- Born: Alfie Middlemiss; 6 June 2003 (age 23); Manchester, England
- Occupations: Actor; Boxer
- Years active: 2011, 2013, 2022–present
- Television: Emmerdale; Dear England
- Relatives: Philip Middlemiss (father)
- Boxing career
- Height: 5 ft 7 in (170 cm)
- Weight: Featherweight
- Stance: Orthodox

Boxing record
- Total fights: 7
- Wins: 7
- Win by KO: 1

Alfie Middlemiss (born 6 June 2003) is an English Actor and professional boxer. He made his acting debut in 2011 on the British soap Emmerdale. More recently he starred in Waterloo Road and most notably portrayed English footballer Phil Foden in the BBC One show, Dear England. As a boxer he has amassed a professional record of 7-0 (1 KO).

== Early life ==
Alfie Middlemiss was born 6 June, 2003 in Manchester England and grew up in Worsley. He is the son of Coronation Street legend Philip Middlemiss. He attended Bridgewater School in Worsley, achieving three A's at A-level.

== Acting career ==
Middlemiss first began his acting career starring in commercial campaigns for British Supermarket chain Morrisons at the age of 10. Middlemiss made his television acting debut on the British Soap Emmerdale in 2011. He portrayed Harry Murray, son of Cameron Murray (Dominic Power), reprising the role in 2013. Middlemiss returned to television in 2022, when he appeared in an episode of The Madame Blanc Mysteries. He later starred in an episode of Doctors in 2023.

Middlemiss starred as Kyle in Series 16 and 17 of Waterloo Road for two episodes. In 2025, it was announced Middlemiss would portray Phil Foden in BBC One's Dear England, adapted from the stage play of the same name, which released in May 2026.

== Boxing career ==
Middlemiss began boxing at the age of 14, training at Jamie Moore's gym in Walkden, before amassing 40 amateur fights, becoming North West Champion and National Champion at 60kg.

=== Early career ===
Middlemiss made his professional debut on 6 December 2024 at the Exhibition Centre Liverpool against Jesus Gonzalez (3-3) on the undercard of Dayan Gonzalez vs Wira Mikham. Middlemiss won the fight by unanimous decision. Middlemiss would have another unanimous decision victory over Caine Singh (1-5-2), at the Co-op Live in Manchester on the undercard of Jack Catterall vs Arnold Barboza Jr. in February 2025. Middlemiss would achieve his third decision victory against Yahir Alexander Solorio Morales (6-11-5) at the Co-op Live in April 2025. Middlemiss would achieve his fourth decision victory over Mohammed Wako (1-5) in July 2025 at the Manchester Arena and his fifth decision victory over Engel Gomez (9-53-3) in November 2025, at the Bp pulse LIVE in Birmingham on the Benjamin Whittaker vs Benjamin Gavazi undercard.

In January 2026, Middlemiss would sign to Eddie Hearn's Matchroom Boxing. Middlemiss would achieve another decision victory over fellow Englishman Lewis Morris (10-3-1) on April 3, 2026 at Planet Ice Altrincham on the undercard of Patrick Brown vs Vasil Ducar. Middlemiss would achieve his first TKO victory as a professional over Italian boxer, Christopher Mondongo (10-3) on September 19, 2026 at the Co-op Live, as part of the John Hedges vs Patrick Brown undercard.

== Filmography ==
Year	Title	Role	Notes
2011, 2013	Emmerdale	Harry Murray	11 Episodes
2022	The Madame Blanc Mysteries	Archie	Episode: "Christmas in Sainte Victoire"
2023	Doctors	Mason Sands	Episode: "The Bicycle Thief of Letherbridge"
2025–2026	Waterloo Road	Kyle	2 episodes
2026	Dear England	Phil Foden	4 episodes

== Professional boxing record ==
7 fights	7 wins	0 losses
By knockout	1	0
By decision	6	0

No.	Result	Record	Opponent	Type	Round, time	Date	Location	Notes
7	Win	7-0	Christopher Mondongo	TKO	4 (8) 3:00	19 Sep 2026	Co-op Live, Manchester, England	
6	Win	6-0	Lewis Morris	UD	8	3 April 2026	Planet Ice, Altringham, England	
5	Win	5-0	Engel Gomez	UD	6	29 Nov 2025	Bp pulse LIVE, Birmingham, England	
4	Win	4-0	Mohammed Wako	UD	4	5 Jul 2025	Manchester Arena, Manchester, England	
3	Win	3-0	Yahir Alexander Solorio Morales	UD	4	5 April 2025	Co-op Live, Manchester, England	
2	Win	2-0	Caine Singh	UD	4	15 Feb 2025	Co-op Live, Manchester, England	
1	Win	1-0	Jesus Gonzalez	UD	4	6 Dec 2024	Exhibition Centre, Liverpool, England	
