= Camilla Beeput =

English actress

- Born: Camilla Marie Beeput; 9 September 1981 (age 44); Westminster, London, England
- Occupations: Actress; singer
- Years active: 2002–present

Camilla Marie Beeput (born 9 September 1981) is an English stage, television and film actress and singer.

Winner of the Next Generation, Voice of a Woman Award (2015), Beeput was first discovered on Fame Academy in 2002 and has gone on to release music with rapper Erick Sermon, sing duets with Lionel Richie, and play leads in West End musicals West Side Story and Daddy Cool. As of 2017, she was most recently seen in the critically acclaimed Sky Atlantic series Save Me with Lennie James and Stephen Graham and Sky One's Sick Note with Rupert Grint and Lindsay Lohan. Beeput is also known for her roles in Peep Show and Grantchester, and for her voice acting role in Doctor Who portraying Nova, companion of the Ninth Doctor.

== Early life ==
Beeput was born in Westminster, London and raised in Brent. She attended Bentley Wood High School.

== Career ==
=== Theatre ===
She was spotted by theatre director Paul Kerryson while participating in the first season of the BBC reality television series Fame Academy in 2002.

After Fame Academy, Beeput went on to star as Maria in a production of the musical West Side Story at Leicester Haymarket Theatre,

Beeput played Shun in the Young Vic production of In The Red And Brown Water by Tarell Alvin McCraney and various roles in the James Graham play Monster Raving Loony at Theatre Royal, Plymouth. She played Rose in the London West End production of Daddy Cool, a musical based on the music of Boney M., at the Shaftesbury Theatre and European tour.

During summer 2017 Beeput premiered a one-woman show she had co-composed with musician Alex Webb at the Norfolk & Norwich, Bath and Aldeburgh festivals. Stormy: the Life of Lena Horne told the story of the African-American singer, actress and civil rights activist through Beeput's script and a series of Beeput-Webb compositions. The show received excellent reviews, including from The Times, which called it 'a bravura one-woman display from the charismatic Camilla Beeput'.

=== Singer ===
After her early work in theatre, Beeput wrote and recorded "Don't Hold Back", which features rapper Erick Sermon of the group EPMD and was released on 28 August 2006. In 2009, a track called "Oh What You Did", with US rapper Juelz Santana from the New York rap group Dipset, was recorded but never officially released.

=== Television ===
In 2017, Beeput played Zita in the critically acclaimed drama Save Me on Sky Atlantic written and starring Lenny James. In 2016-17 she played Vanessa in series 1 and 2 of Sick Note on Sky One. In 2016 Camilla worked with Michael Gambon and Luke Treadaway in The Nightmare Worlds of H. G. Wells on Sky Arts. In 2015, Beeput played Jane Finn in the BBC One Agatha Christie adaptation Partners in Crime and played Fiona in Legends with Sean Bean. Beeput has also appeared in The Attack, Scott & Bailey, Babylon, Birds of a Feather, Death in Paradise, White Van Man, Me and Mrs Jones and Law and Order. In 2010, she played Zahra in Peep Show series 7. In 2011, she played Natalie in Top Boy, a four-part TV drama on Channel 4. In 2014, she played nightclub singer Gloria Dee in series 1 episode 5 of Grantchester and she is featured heavily on the soundtrack under "Gloria Dee and her Quartet" alongside television composer John Lunn. In August 2015, she played Sally Whitechurch in an episode of New Tricks on BBC1.

=== Film ===
Beeput worked with Johnny Depp and Gwyneth Paltrow in the film Mortdecai, and played the lead in indie horror Writer's Retreat. In 2015, Beeput played Lisa in the indie film Super Bob with Catherine Tate. She also appeared in The Harry Hill Movie.

== Filmography ==
- Fame Academy (2002) as herself (Series 1)
- Footballers' Wives (5 episodes, 2005) as Bethany Mortimer
- The Bill (1 episode, 2006) as Kelly Haynes
- Plus One (1 episode, 2009) as Aimee
- Law & Order: UK (1 episode, 2009) as Maya
- Lunch Monkeys (6 episodes, 2009) as Leigh Anne
- Push (3 episodes, 2010)
- Peep Show (5 episodes, 2010) as Zahra
- Death in Paradise (1 episode, 2011) as Margaret
- Top Boy (2 episodes, 2011) as Natalie
- White Van Man (2 episodes, 2012) as Jasmine
- Doctors (3 episodes, 2009–2012) as Alice Hadley-Richards
- Fit (12 episodes, 2013)
- Birds of a Feather (8 episodes, (2014) – Marcie
- Grantchester (2014) season 1, episode 5- Gloria Dee
- The Split (2018)
- Cuckoo (2018)
- Save Me (2017)
- Sick Note (2017–2018) as Vanessa (seasons 1-2)
- The Suspect (2022) as Julianne (five episodes)
- Dune: Prophecy (2024) as Reverend Mother Dorotea; Episode: "The Hidden Hand"
- Midsomer Murders (2025) as Lucy Weaving; Episode: "Treasures of Darkness"
- Bergerac (2026) as Nicola
