= Sherwood (2022 TV series) =

British television series

- Genre: Crime drama; Detective; Mystery
- Created by: James Graham
- Starring: David Morrissey; Lesley Manville; Claire Rushbrook; Lorraine Ashbourne; Philip Jackson; Perry Fitzpatrick; Bill Jones; Robert Glenister; Lindsay Duncan; Robert Lindsay
- Music by: Lorne Balfe
- Country of origin: United Kingdom
- Original language: English
- No. of series: 2
- No. of episodes: 12

Production
- Executive producers: James Graham; Lewis Arnold; Juliette Howell; Ben Irving; Tessa Ross; Harriet Spencer
- Producer: Rebecca Hodgson
- Running time: 57 minutes
- Production company: House Productions

Original release
- Network: BBC One
- Release: 13 June 2022 – present

Sherwood is a British television crime drama series created and written by James Graham. It stars David Morrissey and Lesley Manville and is inspired by real life murders in Nottinghamshire, England in 2004. The first episode of the six-episode series aired on BBC One on 13 June 2022. It was renewed for a second series, which premiered on 25 August 2024. In September 2024, a third series was announced. In November 2026, Graham stated that the third series would be the last, which is expected to premiere in early 2027.

== Plot ==
Set in a Nottinghamshire mining village, two shocking killings shatter an already fractured community with a dark past arising from divisions created by the 1984–85 miners' strike which have persisted. The story is loosely based on the actual murders of trade unionist Keith Frogson and hairdresser Chanel Taylor in July 2004. The fictional story begins with the murder of a former union activist, Gary Jackson. Jackson's interest in former police covert activities within the community leads the police to suspect a connection with the miners' strike.

The series has attracted broadly positive reaction for its recognition and portrayal of the tensions in the community rooted in the period of the miners' strike.

== Cast and characters ==
- David Morrissey as DCS Ian St Clair
  - George Howard as young Ian (Series 1)
- Lesley Manville as Julie Jackson
  - Poppy Gilbert as young Julie Jackson (Series 1)
- Robert Glenister as DI Kevin Salisbury (Series 1, 3)
  - Tom Glenister as young Kevin (Series 1)
- Kevin Doyle as Fred Rowley (Series 1)
- Claire Rushbrook as Cathy Rowley
- Lorraine Ashbourne as Daphne Sparrow
- Philip Jackson as Mickey Sparrow (Series 1–2)
- Perry Fitzpatrick as Rory Sparrow
- Bill Jones as Ronan Sparrow
- Terence Maynard as DS Cleaver (Series 1)
- Andrea Lowe as DI Taylor (Series 1)
- Clare Holman as Helen St Clair (Series 1)
- Adam Hugill as Scott Rowley. ( series 1 &2
- Pip Torrens as Commissioner Charles Dawes (Series 1)
- Adeel Akhtar as Andy Fisher (Series 1)
- Bally Gill as Neel Fisher (Series 1)
- Joanne Froggatt as Sarah Vincent (Series 1)
- Nadine Marshall as Jenny Harris (Series 1)
- Don Gilet as Jacob Harris (Series 1)
- Sunetra Sarker as Sheriff of Nottingham (Series 1)
- Ace Bhatti as Vinay Chakarbati (Series 1)
- Lindsay Duncan as Jennifer Hale (Series 1, 3)
- Stephen Tompkinson as Warnock (Series 1)
- Mark Addy as Ron St. Clair (Series 1)
- Mark Frost as Martín St. Clair (Series 1)
  - Callum Hymers as young Martin (Series 1)
- Safia Oakley-Green as Cinderella Jackson (Series 1)
- Alun Armstrong as Gary Jackson (Series 1)
- Monica Dolan as Ann Branson (Series 2)
- David Harewood as Dennis Bottomley (Series 2)
- Robert Lindsay as Franklin Warner (Series 2& 3)
- Ria Zmitrowicz as Lisa Waters (Series 2)
- Michael Balogun as DCS Harry Summers (Series 2)
- Stephen Dillane as Roy Branson (Series 2)
- Sharlene Whyte as Pam Bottomley (Series 2)
- Robert Emms as Samuel Warner (Series 2)
- Oliver Huntingdon as Ryan Bottomley (Series 2)
- Christine Bottomley as Rachel Crossley (Series 2 & 3)
- Aisling Loftus as Sandy Waters (Series 2)
- Jorden Myrie as DI Marcus Clarke (Series 2)
- Bethany Asher as Stephie Bottomley (Series 2)
- Rosalie Craig as Zoe Wood (Series 3)
- Joe Dempsie as Alex Wood (Series 3)
- Sue Johnston as Irene Bostall (Series 3)
- Peter Wight as Eric Bostall (Series 3)
- Kirby Howell-Baptiste as DI Zara Gill (Series 3)

== Episodes ==
Series	Episodes	Originally released		Avg. UK viewers (millions)
Series	Episodes	First released	Last released	Avg. UK viewers (millions)
1	6	13 June 2022	28 June 2022	5.62
2	6	25 August 2024	9 September 2024	3.81

=== Series 1 (2022) ===
No.	Title	Directed by	Written by	Original release date	UK viewers (millions)
1	"Episode 1"	Lewis Arnold	James Graham	13 June 2022	6.19
A village in Nottinghamshire is preparing for the wedding of Neel Fisher and Sarah Vincent, with his father, Andy, delivering a speech, covering his son's upbringing and his enthusiasm for the railway in the region. Local DCI Ian St Clair is among the wedding guests, and later finds himself investigating the death of former trade unionist Gary Jackson who was killed by an arrow. According to witness accounts Gary had provoked Dean Simmons into throwing an object at him while they were both at a bar the night Gary was killed. St Clair and his team believe that the killer was skilled in archery. Looking into Jackson's past, St Clair discovers that he was arrested and then quickly released on bail during the 1984 miners strike, but some parts of the documents are redacted. He contacts the Metropolitan Police officer who assisted him at the time, Kevin Salisbury, who claims to not remember much of the arrest. Despite this his boss, Commander Dawes, asks him to assist St Clair with the investigation. Arriving in Nottinghamshire Salisbury is advised to be careful, since locals remain resentful of the London police. Salisbury decides to withdraw and instead follow as an observer. The investigation turns to the Sparrow family, who run an archery range and are known to own bows and arrows. They become prime suspects. St Clair’s and his team's suspicions are heightened when they discover a used bow and arrow of the same type that was used to kill Jackson. Initially it seems the case is open and shut, but St Clair still believes the possibility of a connection to Jackson's arrest during the miners' strike. Salisbury dismisses this but gives a vague account of what happened with Jackson's arrest. In an undisclosed location in Sherwood Forest Scott Rowley, the stepson of Julie Jackson's sister Cathy, is seen practising with a bow and arrows.
2	"Episode 2"	Lewis Arnold	James Graham	14 June 2022	5.52
While driving the local train service Andy Fisher is forced to stop when an arrow hits his side window. St Clair and his team are baffled since there seems to be no connection between Fisher and the possible motive of the killer. At the same time the Sparrow family are ruled out as suspects since they were in custody at the time of the train attack. Salisbury returns to London but before leaving meets an old flame, Jenny Harris, whom he met during the strike. St Clair and his team learn of Scott Rowley, who has missed a court hearing about his prison sentence, and storm his house, but he isn't present, only his father and stepmother. His father, Fred, tells them about a garage he let Scott use, where they discover old newspapers and papers on Gary Jackson and computers. As St Clair faces pressure from the local council about the investigation, another arrow attack, on Jackson's solicitor, Vinay Chakarabarti, occurs. Salisbury learns of the escalation of the attacks and decides to return to Nottinghamshire on his own accord, and rejoins the investigation. He explains that St. Clair might be right about a possible connection to Jackson's arrest. They meet Chakarabarti, who explains how Jackson believed that the SDS had placed undercover officers among the miners during the miners' strike, and that he believed that not all of them had left, and that one of them still lived in their community. Cindy Jackson, Julie Jackson's granddaughter, decides to distance herself from Ronan Sparrow, with whom she was in a relationship. Andy Fisher takes a parcel, that he has accepted for Neel and Sarah, who live next door, while they were out. As she opens the parcel to find it is a spade Sarah berates Andy for entering her house without knocking and ridicules him about his wife's death. In a fit of rage, Andy strikes her with the spade.
3	"Episode 3"	Lewis Arnold	James Graham	20 June 2022	5.18
Neel returns to Nottinghamshire and discovers Sarah's body shortly after meeting his father. St. Clair makes Scott's identity public and his mother makes a plea for him to turn himself in. An investigation into Sarah's death is soon launched, and both St. Clair and Salisbury find the death unusual and it breaking Scott's killing pattern. The spade used in her murder is soon discovered, but no fingerprints pointing to the killer are found. At the same time, a peacock is killed with an arrow at Newstead Abbey. Jackson's union friends arrive in the village to attend a memorial and cause a stir at the bar when one of them makes Jackson's SDS suspicions public knowledge. Scott returns to the village and sneaks into the Jackson residence, not flushing the toilet and changes Noah's PlayStation username to Robbie Platt. Julie later discovers the name in Gary's box, learning that it was a fake identity. Salisbury investigates the spade delivery to the Fisher residence and informs St. Clair that Andy had received it. As Neel is out driving with his father, he is called by St. Clair and shortly afterwards, Andy stops the car and runs frantically into a field.
4	"Episode 4"	Ben A. Williams	James Graham	21 June 2022	5.55
As Andy Fisher flees into the woods, Scott claims another victim at a local golf course, injuring another participant in the process, who is later revealed to be Jacob Harris, Jenny Harris' husband and friend of St. Clair. As a manhunt is launched for Fisher and Scott, St. Clair is forced to accept assistance from the London police and has Salisbury address the community in a town meeting. While questioning Jacob, he indirectly reveals an affair between Jacob and the victim, Amy Whitstable. Julie presents the Robbie Platt clues to St. Clair and Daphne Sparrow visits her and informs her about her son and her granddaughter's relationship. St. Clair and Salisbury meet former NUM member and solicitor Jennifer Hale, who informs them of the government's scheme and plans with SDS agents and how the strikes were provoked in the first place. Salisbury decides to ask his force himself about the Platt identity, and his boss, commissioner Dawes, points him to now retired agent Bill Raggett. He tells Salisbury that there were five agents stationed in the community and that all returned home except one codenamed Keats. Having brought up St. Clair's wife earlier, Salisbury is contacted by her, who confirms that her name is not her real one. Just then, Raggett commits suicide and St. Clair returns home, also realising that Salisbury might have been right about his wife.
5	"Episode 5"	Ben A. Williams	James Graham	27 June 2022 (Note: Due to overrunning Wimbledon coverage on BBC One, this episode was broadcast on BBC Two.)	5.42
Andy Fisher wakes up after getting knocked out by Scott Rowley. The two form an unlikely bond as they continue to escape together. Back in the village, Neel discovers his father's voicemail and informs the police. Scott returns Fisher's phone and has him run away with his bow to distract the police from himself. The police find Fisher and has him surrounded, but are forced to shoot him when he lifts the bow. Salisbury presents his suspicions to his boss, and is also granted access to Helen's file. He later clears her name for St. Clair. Flashbacks to 1984 follow Keats as she is recruited to the SDS and integrates herself into the community. She befriends Jenny Ryan, who confides in her about her romance with Salisbury, but spreads the word that he will be leaving his post at the garage to see her. Gary Jackson discovers the two in an allotment (community garden), while St. Clair's father joins Jonathan Ryan (Jenny's father) and other friends in stealing tools from the garage, but accidentally start a fire in the process. St. Clair and his brother Martin arrive on scene. The latter fears that their father is inside the burning building and storms inside, and is later hospitalised with severe burns. Jonathan Ryan dies of his injuries, and St. Clair is asked to question Salisbury. His boss later asks him to confirm the names given by Keats, which includes his own father, leading to his eventual arrest. Keats, doubting her actions, meets with Platt (codenamed Wordsworth) and reveals her real name to be Daphne. In the present, a shocked Daphne discovers an arrow in the family's front door.
6	"Episode 6"	Ben A. Williams	James Graham	28 June 2022	5.91
St. Clair gets into an argument with his wife about the confidentiality of her records, which she explains was due to past trauma and St. Clair explains how he had to rule out suspicions. The Sparrows grow increasingly worried that they are the next target, with Rory claiming that Scott might be targeting him for something in the past. Salisbury meets Jenny Harris again at a hotel, and they both are uncertain of whether or not they should get back together. Harris later expresses that they've grown apart, which Salisbury accepts. Mickey discovers Scott in a container at the Sparrow allotment, but Scott knocks him down before fleeing on a motorcycle. Mickey gives chase in his car and notifies the police. Both the police and the locals later have Scott cornered on the same street where Gary Jackson was killed and after Scott drops his bow and arrow, two locals tackle him before the police arrest him. During questioning, he claims that he was wrongfully sent to jail because he didn't know the rules of work payments. In conclusion, it seems he committed the murders and scare spree to get attention, and reveals that he really didn't know the identify of the SDS agent still living in the village. At a community meeting, Scott's father attempts to make a ceasefire between the two sides of the former mining strikes, which partially succeeds and is supported by Julie Jackson. She and St. Clair later discuss who the SDS agent could be, with Julie noting that there were no records of Daphne Dunn at the village from which she claims to have been. Salisbury later receives her number from an old friend and St. Clair tries to call her, but she doesn't respond when she finally picks up. Later, at a school parents meeting, her phone autocorrects 'TICKETS' to her code name 'KEATS' that shows on the big screen for everyone to see. She rushes out of the meeting and returns home, contemplating suicide with a similar revolver that Bill Raggett had. St. Clair arrives and manages to talk her down, promising that she can still live life as she always had wanted.

=== Series 2 (2024) ===
No.	Title	Directed by	Written by	Original release date	UK viewers (millions)
1	"Episode 1"	Clio Barnard	James Graham	25 August 2024	4.74
A proposal for a new mine is launched which creates division in the Ashfield Community. Meanwhile a senseless murder threatens to reignite the flame of the turf wars in Nottingham.
2	"Episode 2"	Clio Barnard	James Graham	26 August 2024	3.65
As they are forced to join the Bransons on their revenge plot, the Sparrows must find a way to help save the Bottomleys. Meanwhile Lisa finds interesting evidence from the past.
3	"Episode 3"	Clio Barnard	James Graham	1 September 2024	3.76
A familiar face joins the police on their investigation, as the community is shaken with news of the latest killings. Meanwhile Lisa meets up with an interest to talk about the evidence she has found, which could affect the future of the mine.
4	"Episode 4"	Tom George	James Graham	2 September 2024	3.35
Running out of options with the investigation, the police ask the Sparrows for help in bringing down the Bransons. Ryan takes advantage of a power vacuum by trying to set up his own empire.
5	"Episode 5"	Tom George	James Graham	8 September 2024	3.78
As the community starts to question the police force, news is received of the assassination attempt. All the while, Daphne’s past continues to haunt her.
6	"Episode 6"	Tom George	James Graham	9 September 2024	3.58
The Sparrows want revenge and are on a hunt to find Ann Branson. The police finally manage to piece everything together in their investigation, as the community tries to look for some sort of future.

== Reception ==
=== Series 1 ===
The series received critical acclaim. On review aggregator Rotten Tomatoes, it holds an approval rating of 100% based on 23 reviews, with an average score of 8.9/10. The website's critical consensus reads "A gripping mystery that draws immense power from its sterling cast and the specificity of its location, Sherwood is such a rich series that it makes the competition look all the poorer."

The Telegraph gave it five stars and declared it "the best BBC drama of the year so far". Lucy Mangan of The Guardian also gave the finale five out of five stars, remarking that the series "didn’t falter in its intricate plotting, attention to detail or its perfect evocation of place". Nick Hilton of The Independent gave it four stars, calling Graham's writing "sympathetic, vibrant storytelling".

The first episode was watched 4,855,000 times on iPlayer alone during 2022, making it the 9th most viewed individual programme on the platform that year.

==== Accolades ====
Year	Award	Category	Nominee(s)	Result	Ref.
2022	Royal Television Society Craft & Design Awards	Costume Design – Drama	Orla Smyth-Mill	Nominated	
2022	Royal Television Society Craft & Design Awards	Make Up Design – Drama	Nadia El-Saffar	Nominated	
2023	Royal Television Society Programme Awards	Drama Series	Sherwood	Won	
2023	Royal Television Society Programme Awards	Supporting Actor – Male	Adeel Akhtar	Won	
2023	British Academy Television Awards	Best Drama Series	James Graham, Lewis Arnold, Rebecca Hodgson, Juliette Howell, Tessa Ross, Harriet Spencer	Nominated	
2023	British Academy Television Awards	Best Supporting Actor	Adeel Akhtar	Won	
2023	British Academy Television Awards	Best Supporting Actress	Lesley Manville	Nominated	
