= Monster Raving Loony (play) =

Play by James Graham

Monster Raving Loony is a play written by British playwright James Graham. It follows the life and exploits of the British rock musician Screaming Lord Sutch, and derives its title from the political party founded and led by Sutch from 1983 until his death in 1997.

The play premiered on 6 February 2016 at Theatre Royal, Plymouth and ran for 3 weeks before transferring to Soho Theatre in London, where it ran from 14 May to 18 June. Directed by Simon Stokes, the original cast consisted of Joseph Alessi, Samuel James, Joanna Brookes, Tom Attwood, Jack Brown and Camilla Beeput. All but one of the cast reprised their roles for the London production, with comedian Vivienne Acheampong taking over Beeput's role.

The play received generally positive reviews. In his 4 star review for the Evening Standard, Henry Hitchings called it "an intriguing look at the mechanisms of democracy - dressed in wilfully outrageous garb, yet unexpectedly touching". Time Out, also awarding 4 stars, called the production "poignant, sweet and brave" while the Financial Times called it a "sharp, canny and original piece of theatre".

The play was longlisted for the 2016 Evening Standard Theatre Awards in the Best Play category.
