= Dear England (TV series) =

British television series

- Genre: Biographical drama
- Based on: Dear England by James Graham
- Written by: James Graham
- Directed by: Rupert Goold; Paul Whittington
- Starring: Joseph Fiennes
- Composer: Kormac
- Country of origin: United Kingdom
- Original language: English
- No. of series: 1
- No. of episodes: 4

Production
- Executive producers: James Graham; Rupert Goold; Andy Harries; Rebecca Hodgson; Jo McClellan; Sami El-Hadi
- Producer: Tina Pawlik
- Running time: 57 minutes
- Production company: Left Bank Pictures

Original release
- Network: BBC One
- Release: 24 May – 1 June 2026

Dear England is a British four-part television drama series based on the stage play of the same name by James Graham, with Joseph Fiennes portraying England football manager Gareth Southgate. The series premiered on 24 May 2026 on BBC One.

== Cast ==
- Ben Chapman as Luke Shaw
- Joseph Fiennes as Gareth Southgate
- Jodie Whittaker as Pippa Grange
- Jason Watkins as Greg Dyke
- John Hodgkinson as Greg Clarke
- Daniel Ryan as Steve Holland
- Sam Spruell as Mike Webster
- Adam Hugill as Harry Maguire
- Josh Barrow as Jordan Pickford
- Lewis Shepherd as Dele Alli
- Will Antenbring as Harry Kane
- Edem-Ita Duke as Marcus Rashford
- Francis Lovehall as Raheem Sterling
- Abdul Sessay as Bukayo Saka
- Jacob Greenway as Jude Bellingham
- David Shields as Jordan Henderson
- Hamish Frew as Eric Dier
- Alfie Middlemiss as Phil Foden
- Riess Fennell as Jadon Sancho
- Daniel Quincy Annoh as Ollie Watkins
- Bobby Schofield as Wayne Rooney
- Dom Rayner as Cole Palmer
- Alexander Parsons as Jesse Lingard
- Lee Chapman as Jamie Vardy
- Michael Watson as Kieran Trippier
- Sam Makepeace-Beach as Declan Rice
- Drew Thomas-Bissmire as Kyle Walker
- Alexander Grantham as Aaron Ramsdale
- Richard Sammel as Thomas Tuchel
- Steven Mackintosh as John Major

== Production ==
The four-part series was commissioned by the BBC in February 2024 based on the successful stage play Dear England by James Graham with Graham adapting the series himself, Joseph Fiennes reprising his role as Gareth Southgate and Left Bank Pictures producing. It was revealed in March 2024 that, despite a more lucrative offer from the American streaming service Netflix, Left Bank and Graham chose the BBC instead. In April 2024, after winning an Olivier Award for the stage production, Graham said he was planning on starting the adaptation the next day. In July 2024, Graham said that the play would be updated for the screen to include UEFA Euro 2024, at which Southgate's England team were finalists.

In July 2025, Jason Watkins, Jodie Whittaker and Francis Lovehall were amongst those added to the cast with filming underway in the south of England. Filming locations include Bethnal Green, London.

== Episodes ==
No.	Title	Directed by	Written by	Original release date
1	"Episode 1"	Rupert Goold	James Graham	24 May 2026
After years of disappointment for the England national football team, Gareth Southgate takes over as temporary manager following the resignation of Sam Allardyce, while still haunted by his infamous missed penalty at UEFA Euro 1996. Working with sports psychologist Pippa Grange, he tries to change the team's culture, encouraging openness, resilience and a healthier attitude toward pressure as England enters the 2018 FIFA World Cup in Russia. After successfully qualifying for the tournament, Southgate is appointed England manager on a permanent basis. England then defeats Colombia in a penalty shoot-out to reach the quarter-finals, the first England win on penalties at a World Cup.
2	"Episode 2"	Paul Whittington	James Graham	24 May 2026
Following the success of their 2018 FIFA World Cup run, England arrive at the delayed UEFA Euro 2020 tournament with growing expectations. Southgate's squad becomes a symbol of national unity, but the pressure intensifies as they pursue a first major trophy in decades and face the emotional highs and lows of a tournament largely played on home soil.
3	"Episode 3"	Paul Whittington	James Graham	31 May 2026
The pain of the UEFA Euro 2020 final defeat to Italy lingers. As criticism mounts over the team's public stances on social and political issues, Southgate begins to question himself. Heading into the controversial 2022 FIFA World Cup in Qatar, he must rebuild confidence in both the squad and his own leadership.
4	"Episode 4"	Paul Whittington	James Graham	31 May 2026
England enters UEFA Euro 2024 as one of the tournament favourites and what appears to be Southgate’s final campaign. Injuries, selection dilemmas, and mounting public scrutiny test him once again. As the tournament unfolds, Southgate reflects on his legacy and the impact he has had on the team and the country.

== Reception ==
The review aggregator website Rotten Tomatoes gave the series a 100% approval rating based on 7 reviews.

Frances Ryan of The Guardian described the series as "rousing", "joyful", and "a stirring take on national identity", particularly highlighting the "deeply affecting" scenes depicting racist abuse of England's black players, and Fiennes' "wonderful vulnerability". Ryan's colleague Jack Seale was less effusive, criticising Fiennes' performance as a "caricature", although he praised the ensemble cast's performance generally, awarding the programme three stars out of five.

Louis Chilton of The Independent was similarly indifferent, giving the programme two stars out of five, declaring it "doesn’t have what it takes to make it past the group stage." However, Gareth McLean of the Radio Times was more positive, giving the show four stars of five, and concluding by saying "Ultimately, what makes Dear England so moving is that it argues for a different kind of leadership and, by extension, a different kind of country."
