= Adam Hugill =

English actor

Adam Hugill (born 1997) is an English actor.

== Acting career ==
A native of Yorkshire, Hugill first explored acting when attending an acting course with his sister at the age of twelve. He went on to study acting at the London Academy of Music and Dramatic Art. His acting career began in 2019, winning Best Actor in a Musical at The Stage Debut Awards for his role in the stage musical Standing at the Sky's Edge. The same year, he appeared in the Sam Mendes film 1917, and was cast in a leading role in the BBC America television series The Watch.

In 2022, Hugill appeared as Rintrah in Doctor Strange in the Multiverse of Madness, and reprised the role in the animated series Marvel Zombies. He starredin the BBC One series Sherwood later that year.

In 2023, Hugill starred as Harry Maguire in the play Dear England at the Royal National Theatre. He reprised the role in the television adaptation for BBC One.

In 2025, he appeared in the miniseries Towards Zero.

== Filmography ==
=== Film ===
Year	Title	Role	Notes
2019	1917	Private Atkins	
2020	How to Stop a Recurring Dream	Kayden	
2020	The Banishing	Frank Peerless	
2022	Doctor Strange in the Multiverse of Madness	Rintrah (voice)	

=== Television ===
Year	Title	Role	Notes
2019	Pennyworth	Jack	1 episode
2019	World on Fire	Vic	1 episode
2021	The Watch	Carrot Ironfoundersson	Miniseries, 8 episodes
2022–2024	Sherwood	Scott Rowley	Recurring role, 12 episodes
2025	Towards Zero	Mac	Miniseries, 3 episodes
2025	Marvel Zombies	Rintrah (voice)	2 episodes
2026	Dear England	Harry Maguire	Miniseries, 4 episodes
TBA	Legacy of Spies †	Fawn	Upcoming series

== Stage ==
Year	Title	Role	Theatre
2019	Standing at the Sky's Edge	Jimmy	Crucible Theatre
2023	Dear England	Harry Maguire	Royal National Theatre
