= Prince Edward Theatre =

West End theatre in London

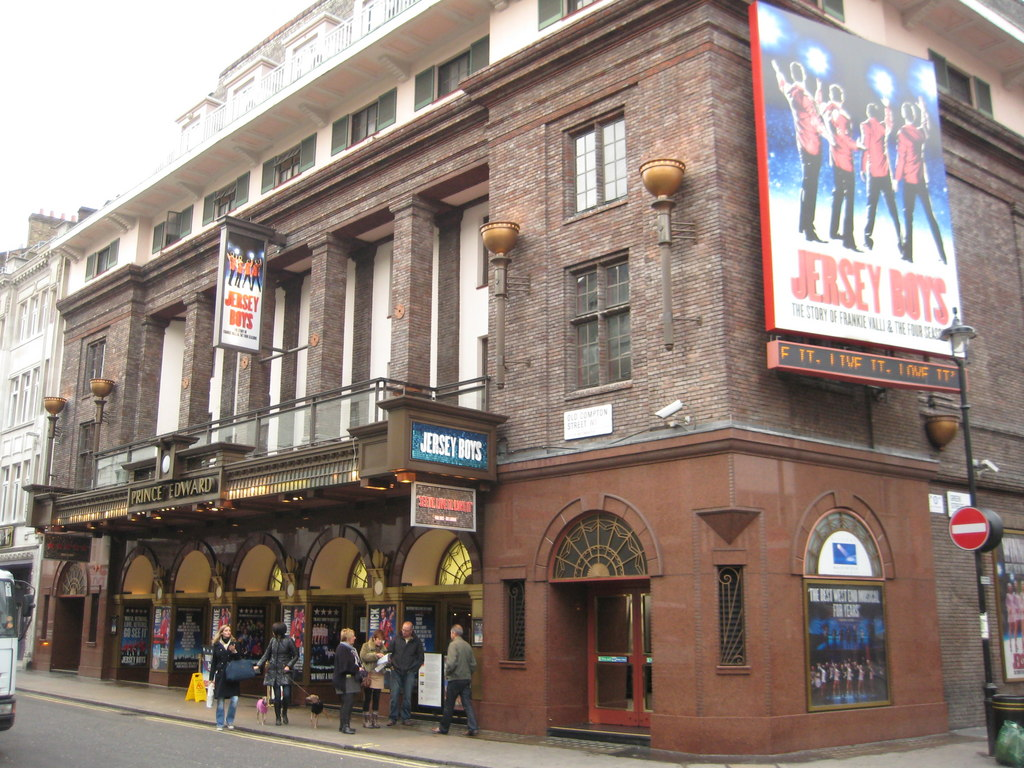
- Prince Edward Theatre in November 2010
- Interactive map of Prince Edward Theatre
- Address: Old Compton Street; London, W1; England, United Kingdom
- Coordinates: 51°30′49″N 00°07′51″W
- Owner: Delfont Mackintosh Theatres
- Capacity: 1,727
- Type: West End theatre
- Production: Beetlejuice
- Public transit: Leicester Square; Tottenham Court Road

Construction
- Opened: 1930; 96 years ago
- Rebuilt: 1946 (T. & B. Braddock); 1978 (RHWL Architects)
- Architect: Edward Stone

Website
- Prince Edward Theatre website at Delfont Mackintosh Theatres

The Prince Edward Theatre is a West End theatre situated on Old Compton Street, just north of Leicester Square, in the City of Westminster, London.

== History ==
The theatre was designed in 1930 by Edward A. Stone, with an interior designed by Marc-Henri Levy and Gaston Laverdet. It cost over £400,000 to be built. Named after Prince Edward (at the time Prince of Wales, briefly Edward VIII and later Duke of Windsor), it opened on 3 April 1930 with a performance of the musical Rio Rita. Other notable events in its opening years included the London debut of famed cabaret artiste Josephine Baker, who performed her famous 'Bananas Dance'.

The theatre was a failure and in 1935, Stone converted the theatre to a dance and cabaret hall at a further cost of £50,000, being renamed the "London Casino" offering dinner or supper dancing with a cabaret revue. The Casino closed but was reopened in 1939 after being bought by a syndicate led by Charles Clore and the managing director of the Prince of Wales Theatre, which Clore owned.

As the London Casino, it was badly damaged and all its windows lost on 10 May 1941, in London's worst air raid of the Second World War. All neighbouring buildings directly across Greek Street were destroyed.

Stage alterations were undertaken by Thomas Braddock in 1942, and that year the building re-opened as the "Queensberry All Services Club"—a club for servicemen where the shows were broadcast on the BBC. After the war, the architects T. and E. Braddock restored the building to theatrical use, becoming the "London Casino" once again — where the 'King of Yiddish Music', Leo Fuld, was a major attraction. The last production before Cinerama took over the building was Wish You Were Here, which included a full-size swimming pool on stage.

== Cinerama ==
The three-projector, very-wide-screen Cinerama process had made its debut in New York in September 1952 with This Is Cinerama, a spectacular travelogue designed to make the most of the process, and an enormous box office success. The Cinerama Corporation chose the Casino Theatre for the UK debut of the system, and in 1954 architects Frank Baessler and T. and E. Braddock drew up plans for the conversion. This required the installation of three separate projection boxes at stalls level, and a deeply curved screen in front of the proscenium that was 65 feet (20 m) wide and 26 feet (7.9 m) high. Five speakers behind the screen and others around the auditorium supported the system's seven-track stereophonic sound. Many front stall's seats were removed, and others were lost by the installation of the projection boxes. The sightlines from the upper circle were too poor, and it was taken out of use. Seating capacity was reduced to 1,337.

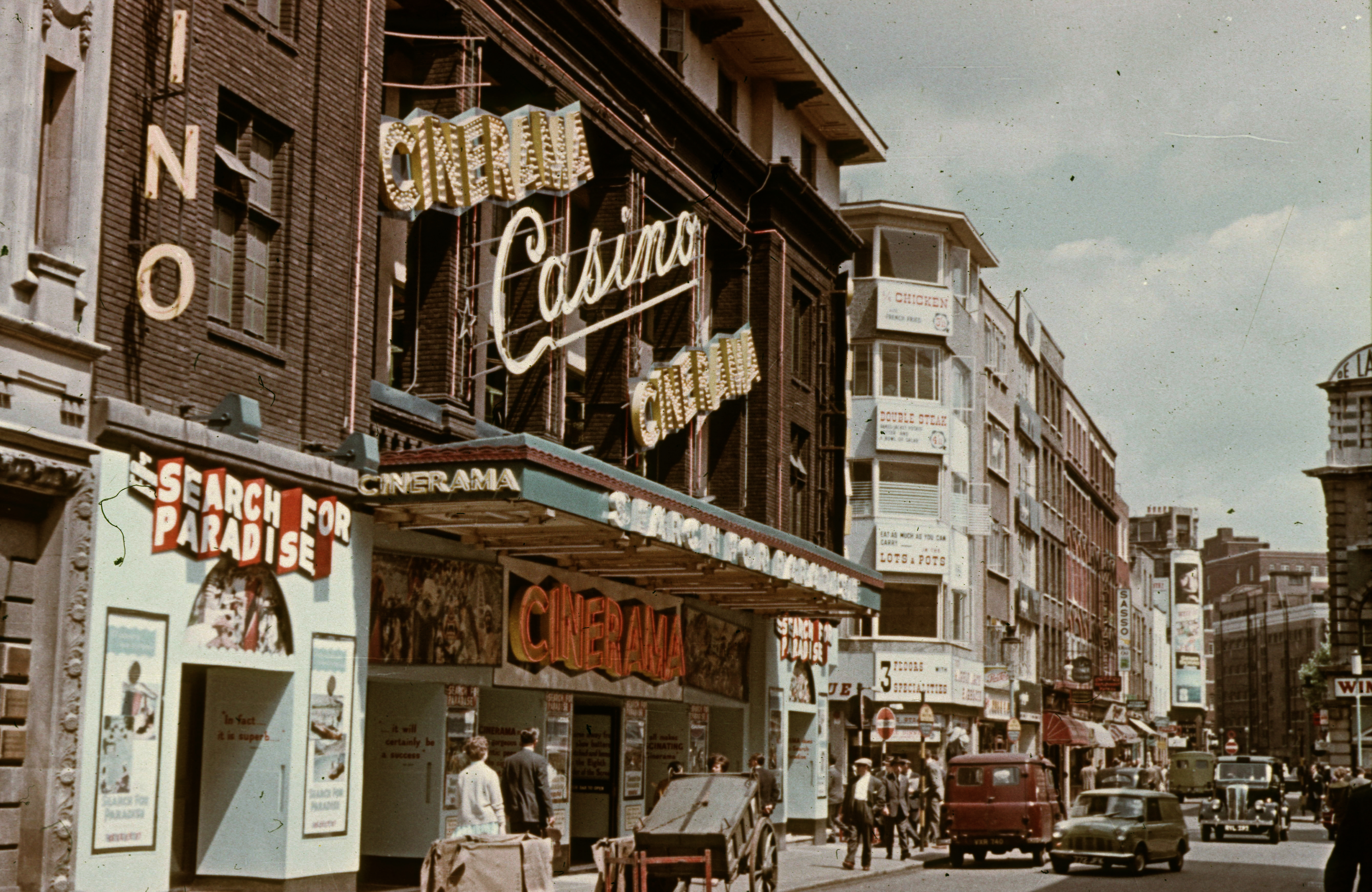
The Prince Edward Theatre in the early 1960s, while it was operating as the Casino Cinema and presenting the Cinerama film Search for Paradise

The premiere of This Is Cinerama took place on 30 September 1954. Like all subsequent presentations, the film was shown on a roadshow theatrical basis, with reserved seats and an intermission, which was required to load the spools for the second half onto the single projectors in each box. Unlike future 'roadshow' practice, there were three shows a day and the film ran until 28 January 1956. From 3 February 1956, the second Cinerama film, Cinerama Holiday was presented, running until 22 February 1958. From 25 February 1958, the third Cinerama travelogue, Seven Wonders of the World played, running until 31 October 1959 before being replaced by South Seas Adventure from 3 November 1959 to 4 March 1961. The final Cinerama travelogue presentation was Search for Paradise from 8 March 1961 to 4 November 1961. The theatre showed the first four films again during 1962. Over the eight years, the theatre grossed $9.5 million from the films.

The Casino was chosen for the world premiere of How the West Was Won, the second (and final) narrative film in the three-strip Cinerama process. The premiere took place on 1 November 1962, and the film ran for 123 weeks, closing on 13 March 1965. This was the final three-strip presentation at the Casino, for the Cinerama corporation had in 1963 adopted 70mm "single lens" Cinerama as the future standard. The two outer projection boxes at the Casino were taken out of use, and the centre box enlarged to take two Philips DP70 projectors capable of 35mm and 70mm projection. The single-strip system had made its debut in the UK at the Coliseum Cinerama at the end of 1963, and the first film in the process at the Casino was The Greatest Story Ever Told, which ran from 8 April to 28 July 1965.

The Casino now entered into a period of large-scale 70mm "presented in Cinerama" roadshow runs:-

- The Hallelujah Trail (29 July – 15 December 1965)
- Battle of the Bulge (17 December 1965 – 8 June 1966)
- Khartoum (9 June 1966 – 8 March 1967), a Royal World Premiere in the presence of HRH Princess Margaret
- Grand Prix (9 March 1967 – 8 November 1967)
- Custer of the West (9 November 1967 – 30 April 1968)
- 2001: A Space Odyssey (1 May 1968 – 25 March 1969)
- Ice Station Zebra (27 March – 8 October 1969)
- Winning (9 October – 1 December 1969), a 35mm blow-up
- Ben-Hur (26 December 1969 – 6 May 1970)
- Patton (7 May – 14 October 1970)
- Two Mules for Sister Sara (15 October – 9 December 1970), a 35mm blow-up
- Song of Norway (10 December 1970 – 2 February 1972), a Royal Premiere in the presence of HRH Princess Alexandra

For the next two years the Casino found the going increasingly tough, with revivals of old films and premieres of new ones, most of which opened to negative reviews in the UK. The final presentation "in Cinerama" was Run, Run, Joe! and Cinerama vacated the Casino in May 1974.

== Return to theatrical use ==
The theatre was acquired by EMI, and refurbished at a cost of £150,000. The Cinerama screen was removed and replaced with a conventional one within the proscenium and the 70mm projectors were removed and replaced with a single 35mm projector and non-rewind system. The Casino Theatre continued in use as a cinema showing films, including the remake of King Kong. It also staged occasional theatre productions such as Dean (a musical about James Dean) in 1976, and the following year a Christmas production of Peter Pan with Ron Moody as Captain Hook. The final film run was a revival of Lady Sings the Blues and Mahogany which ended on 8 April 1978. The building was then converted back into a full-time theatre by RHWL Architects and given its original name, reopening with the world première of the musical Evita on 21 June 1978. Further renovations were undertaken by RHWL in 1992–93, increasing the size of the stage, reopening 3 March 1993 with a revival of Crazy for You. The ABBA musical Mamma Mia! premièred here on 6 April 1999, transferring to the Prince of Wales Theatre after a five-year run.

Owned by the Delfont Mackintosh Group, and with a capacity of 1,716, it formerly hosted Mary Poppins until 12 January 2008, before the show toured the UK. Jersey Boys opened on 18 March 2008 and moved to the Piccadilly Theatre in March 2014, A revival of Miss Saigon opened at the Prince Edward Theatre in May 2014.

Disney's production of Aladdin opened in June 2016 at the theatre and continued performances until August 2019.

Disney's production of Mary Poppins returned to the theatre in 2019 and was scheduled to close on 8 January 2023.

Ain’t Too Proud: The Life and Times of The Temptations was scheduled to open on 31 March 2023 and closed on 17 September 2023.

MJ the Musical, based on the life of Michael Jackson, opened in March 2024 and ran until February 2026.

Beetlejuice, based on the 1988 film of the same name, opened at the Prince Edward Theatre in May 2026 and is scheduled to close in January 2027.

== Recent and present productions ==
| Production | Opening date | Closing date | Writers | Performers |
|---|---|---|---|---|
| Evita | 21 June 1978 | 8 February 1986 | Andrew Lloyd Webber and Tim Rice | Elaine Paige, David Essex, Joss Ackland |
| Chess | 14 May 1986 | 8 April 1989 | Tim Rice, Björn Ulvaeus and Benny Andersson | Elaine Paige, Tommy Körberg and Murray Head |
| Anything Goes | 4 July 1989 | 25 August 1990 | Cole Porter | Elaine Paige, John Barrowman, Bernard Cribbins and Louise Gold |
| Children of Eden | 8 January 1991 | 6 April 1991 | Stephen Schwartz | John Caird |
| The Music of Andrew Lloyd Webber | 14 May 1991 | 25 May 1991 | Andrew Lloyd Webber | Sarah Brightman |
| The Hunting of the Snark | 24 October 1991 | 14 December 1991 | Mike Batt | |
| Sugar | 19 March 1992 | 20 June 1992 | Jule Styne and Bob Merrill | Tommy Steele |
| Crazy for You | 3 March 1993 | 24 February 1996 | George and Ira Gershwin and Ken Ludwig | Ruthie Henshall and Kirby Ward |
| Martin Guerre | 10 July 1996 | 28 February 1998 | Claude-Michel Schönberg, Alain Boublil and Stephen Clarke | |
| Show Boat | 28 April 1998 | 19 September 1998 | Jerome Kern and Oscar Hammerstein II | |
| West Side Story | 6 October 1998 | 9 January 1999 | Stephen Sondheim, Leonard Bernstein and Arthur Laurents | |
| Mamma Mia! | 6 April 1999 | 27 May 2004 | Catherine Johnson and Björn Ulvaeus and Benny Andersson | Siobhán McCarthy, Louise Plowright and Jenny Galloway |
| Mary Poppins | 15 December 2004 | 12 January 2008 | Richard M. Sherman, Robert B. Sherman, George Stiles, Anthony Drewe and Julian Fellowes | Laura Michelle Kelly, Scarlett Strallen, Gavin Lee and Gavin Creel |
| Jersey Boys | 18 March 2008 | 9 March 2014 | Bob Gaudio based on the music of Frankie Valli and The Four Seasons | |
| Miss Saigon | 21 May 2014 | 27 February 2016 | Alain Boublil and Claude-Michel Schönberg | |
| Aladdin | 9 June 2016 | 24 August 2019 | Alan Menken, Chad Beguelin, Tim Rice and Howard Ashman | |
| Mary Poppins | 23 October 2019 | 8 January 2023 | Richard M. Sherman, Robert B. Sherman, George Stiles, Anthony Drewe and Julian Fellowes | Zizi Strallen, Charlie Stemp and Petula Clark |
| Ain't Too Proud | 31 March 2023 | 17 September 2023 | The Temptations and Dominique Morisseau | |
| Dear England | 9 October 2023 | 13 January 2024 | James Graham | Joseph Fiennes |
| MJ the Musical | 6 March 2024 | 28 February 2026 | Michael Jackson and Lynn Nottage | |
| The Hunchback of Notre Dame | 17 August 2025 | 24 August 2025 | Alan Menken, Stephen Schwartz and Peter Parnell | |
| Beetlejuice | 20 May 2026 | - | Eddie Perfect, Scott Brow and Anthony King | |
