= Dear England =

Play by James Graham (2023)

- Written by: James Graham
- Subject: Sport
- Genre: Drama

Premiere
- Date: 20 June 2023
- Place: Olivier Theatre, National Theatre London
- Directed by: Rupert Goold

Dear England is a play about England football manager Gareth Southgate, the pressures of elite sport, and the role of the national men's football team in the national psyche. The play explores how Southgate helped to change notions of masculinity on the England team. Written by James Graham, it opened in June 2023 at the National Theatre in London starring Joseph Fiennes and directed by Rupert Goold. The title of the play comes from the open letter Southgate wrote to England fans in 2021 during the COVID-19 pandemic.

The play won the 2024 Laurence Olivier Awards for Best New Play and Will Close won the Laurence Olivier Award for Best Actor in a Supporting Role in a Play for his portrayal of Harry Kane.

Playwright James Graham said after the England men lost the UEFA Euro 2024 final to Spain that he would rewrite the ending of Dear England to bring it up to date.

== Plot ==
The play follows the England men's football team under Gareth Southgate in the run-up to, and aftermath of, three tournaments: its unexpected run to the semifinals at the 2018 World Cup in Russia, its disappointing defeat in the 2020 European Championship final at Wembley Stadium, and its quarter-final exit from the 2022 World Cup in Qatar.

The first act opens with a flashback to young Southgate as he misses a penalty at the 1996 Euro semifinals, causing England to be knocked out of the competition. In the next scene, Southgate is announced as the new caretaker manager for the England national men's football team, as members of the public – including builders, barristers, and YouTubers – react. As manager, he proceeds to select his squad, including Harry Kane, Harry Maguire and Marcus Rashford. Southgate brings in psychologist Pippa Grange to assist with training sessions, encouraging players to face their fears by keeping journals and talking about them.

The second act focuses on emotional drama as the players develop under Southgate's leadership and take nerve-wracking penalties. The play also touches on racist abuse experienced by black players on the England team following their loss to Italy in the Euro 2020 final in 2021. It ends with Harry Kane missing a penalty and England getting knocked out of the 2022 World Cup, but with Kane receiving the support from his teammates that Southgate himself had not received as a player.

The play's many comical caricatures include former England managers Sven-Göran Eriksson, Graham Taylor and Fabio Capello; former players and commentators Gary Lineker and Matt Le Tissier; and British prime ministers Theresa May, Boris Johnson and Liz Truss.

== Music ==
The play uses popular music associated with the England teams in the 90s era and Southgate era including:

- "Bitter Sweet Symphony" by the Verve
- "Three Lions" by Baddiel, Skinner and the Lightning Seeds
- "Let Me Entertain You" by Robbie Williams
- "World in Motion" by New Order
- "Vindaloo" by Fat Les
- "Crown" by Stormzy

== Production history ==
=== World premiere: National Theatre (2023) ===
Dear England made its world premiere in the Olivier Theatre at the Royal National Theatre, London where it ran from 20 June to 11 August 2023, starring Joseph Fiennes as Gareth Southgate and directed by Rupert Goold.

=== West End (2023–24) ===
In August 2023, the National Theatre announced that Dear England would transfer to the Prince Edward Theatre in London's West End for a limited 14-week run, with Fiennes reprising his role as Gareth Southgate. The play ran from 9 October 2023 until 13 January 2024. The production was also filmed for National Theatre Live and was broadcast worldwide to cinemas from 25 January.

=== National Theatre revival and Salford (2025) ===
On 4 June 2024, the National Theatre announced that Dear England would be returning to the Olivier Theatre at the National Theatre from 10 March until 24 May 2025 and will then play at The Lowry, Salford for four weeks from 29 May until 29 June 2025. James Graham told the Guardian that he will update the ending of the show for its return. He told the Guardian, “I’ll be changing the play depending on what happens, and I don’t quite know what that will look like.” Gwilym Lee will play Gareth Southgate.

=== UK tour (2025–26) ===
The play toured UK from September 2025, opening at the Theatre Royal, Plymouth ending at the Birmingham Hippodrome in March 2026. The cast was announced on 4th August 2025 to feature David Sturzaker as Gareth Southgate and Samantha Womack as Pippa Grange.

== Principal roles and cast ==
Character	National Theatre	West End	National Theatre revival & Salford	UK tour
Character	2023		2025	2025-2026
Gareth Southgate	Joseph Fiennes	Joseph Fiennes	Gwilym Lee	David Sturzaker
Pippa Grange	Gina McKee	Dervla Kirwan	Liz White	Samantha Womack
Harry Kane	Will Close	Will Close	Ryan Whittle	Oscar Gough
Gary Lineker	Gunnar Cauthery	Gunnar Cauthery	Gunnar Cauthery	Ian Kirkby
Mike Webster	Paul Thornley	Paul Thornley	Matt Bardock	George Rainsford
Harry Maguire	Adam Hugill	Griffin Stevens	Ryan Donaldson	Connor Hawker
Raheem Sterling	Kel Matsena	Kel Matsena	Gamba Cole	Ashley Byam
Marcus Rashford	Darragh Hand	Darragh Hand	Jude Carmichael	Jayden Hanley
Jordan Pickford	Josh Barrow	Josh Barrow	Josh Barrow	Jack Maddison
Dele Alli	Lewis Shepherd	Lewis Shepherd	Tristan Waterson	Liam Prince-Donnelly
Bukayo Saka	Ebenezer Gyau	Denzel Baidoo	Tane Siah	Jass Beki
Jordan Henderson	Will Fletcher	Will Fletcher	Joshua Hill	Jake Ashton-Nelson
Jadon Sancho	Albert Magashi	Albert Magashi	Kadell Herida	Luke Azille
Eric Dier	Ryan Whittle	Ryan Whittle	Tom Lane	Tom Lane
Greg Clarke	John Hodgkinson	John Hodgkinson	John Hodgkinson	Ian Kirkby
Greg Dyke	Tony Turner	Tony Turner	Tony Turner	Ian Bartholomew
Sam Allardyce	Sean Gilder	Lloyd Hutchinson	Martin Marquez	Steven Dykes
Alex Scott	Crystal Condie	Crystal Condie	Felix Forde	Courtney George

== Critical reception ==
The premiere of Dear England received positive reviews overall, with the BBC News saying that the show had "hit the back of the net" according to theatre critics, and The Observer noting that "there were a couple of five-star raves and lots of football-ese puns". While Time Out acknowledged that the premise of "a play about the squad’s resurrection under Gareth Southgate feels like a potentially hubristic idea – dangerously overhyping a gifted man who still hasn’t taken home any actual silverware", a headline in The Times declared, "pitch-perfect Gareth Southgate brings the game home".

The review in the Financial Times ran with the headline: "James Graham scores a winner with exhilarating football play". Susannah Clapp wrote in The Observer that "Once again the playwright shows his particular gift, for writing a popular play with a resonant social theme". Arifa Akbar of The Guardian called the play "a game of two halves", noting that it focused more on "story rather than drama in the first half, while Houman Barekat wrote in The New York Times that he found the second half "considerably less funny" and that it felt "rushed...in contrast to the more leisurely pacing before the intermission."

The set design by Es Devlin, featuring oval rings of light on an expansive stage, was described by Akbar as "incredible...simply yet excellently signifying a stadium", while Nick Curtis of the Evening Standard said that it "powerfully expresses the isolation and exposure of the football pitch."

Actor Joseph Fiennes was widely praised for his portrayal of the England manager, with critic Quentin Letts of The Sunday Times referring to Fiennes's "almost AI-grade exactness", and Dominic Cavendish of The Telegraph lauding his "furrowed, remarkably lookalike Southgate". Calling Fiennes's performance "magnificent", Jason Cowley observed in The New Statesman that, "Not only does he closely resemble the bearded, waistcoat-clad England manager, he expertly captures the flatness of his accent, the awkwardness of his Everyman persona, the twitches and rapid blinking, as well as the thoughtfulness and decency." Alluding to the actor's performance in the lead role in Shakespeare in Love, Cavendish wrote that Fiennes "achieves a mesmeric intellectual intensity, hands deep in pockets or delicately gesticulating, that makes Southgate seem almost like Shakespeare's inheritor, weaving dreams for us all."

Critics called the ensemble "well-cast", with Tatler noting that their "visual resemblances are sometimes uncanny". Many reviewers were impressed with their "mimicry" of England football stars. While The Week lamented that some of the characterisations were "cartoonish", the Financial Times observed "care and nuance" in several of their portrayals. BritishTheatre.com described actor Will Close as "show-stealing" and "hilarious in every aspect" in his portrayal of England captain Harry Kane. Time Out critic Andrzej Lukowski called out Close's Kane as "extremely funny...as affable as he is inarticulate" and also praised Gunnar Cauthery's turn as Gary Lineker. Meanwhile, Steve Dinneen wrote in City A.M. that "Will Close is also excellent as Harry Kane, his impression of a man apparently devoid of personality initially bordering on the cruel but turning full circle as the player's heart and mettle are shown." Alistair Smith of The Stage argued that the deliberate caricatures, also of politicians and other public figures, do "result in some jarring tonal shifts, as the piece veers from serious introspection to something closer to pantomime and back again".

== Awards and nominations ==
=== Original London production ===
Year	Award Ceremony	Category	Nominee	Result
2023	Evening Standard Theatre Awards	Best Play		Nominated
2024	WhatsOnStage Awards	Best Play		Nominated
2024	WhatsOnStage Awards	Best Performer in a Play	Joseph Fiennes	Nominated
2024	WhatsOnStage Awards	Best Supporting Performer in a Play	Will Close	Nominated
2024	WhatsOnStage Awards	Best Direction	Rupert Goold	Nominated
2024	WhatsOnStage Awards	Best Casting Direction	Bryony Jarvis-Taylor	Nominated
2024	WhatsOnStage Awards	Best Choreography	Ellen Kane & Hannes Langolf	Nominated
2024	WhatsOnStage Awards	Best Lighting Design	Jon Clark	Nominated
2024	WhatsOnStage Awards	Best Sound Design	Dan Balfour & Tom Gibbons	Nominated
2024	WhatsOnStage Awards	Best Video Design	Ash J Woodward	Nominated
2024	Laurence Olivier Awards	Best New Play	James Graham	Won
2024	Laurence Olivier Awards	Best Actor	Joseph Fiennes	Nominated
2024	Laurence Olivier Awards	Best Actor in a Supporting Role	Will Close	Won
2024	Laurence Olivier Awards	Best Actress in a Supporting Role	Gina McKee	Nominated
2024	Laurence Olivier Awards	Best Director	Rupert Goold	Nominated
2024	Laurence Olivier Awards	Best Choreographer	Ellen Kane & Hannes Langolf	Nominated
2024	Laurence Olivier Awards	Best Set Design	Es Devlin & Ash J Woodward	Nominated
2024	Laurence Olivier Awards	Best Lighting Design	Jon Clark	Nominated
2024	Laurence Olivier Awards	Best Sound Design	Dan Balfour & Tom Gibbons	Nominated

== Television adaptation ==
On 21 February 2024, it was announced that a four-part television series also written by Graham and directed by Goold was commissioned for BBC One and BBC iPlayer with Fiennes reprising his role of Gareth Southgate. Left Bank Pictures will be executive producers and the series will be distributed internationally by Sony Pictures Television.
