= Gareth Southgate =

English footballer and manager (born 1970)

Sir Gareth Southgate OBE
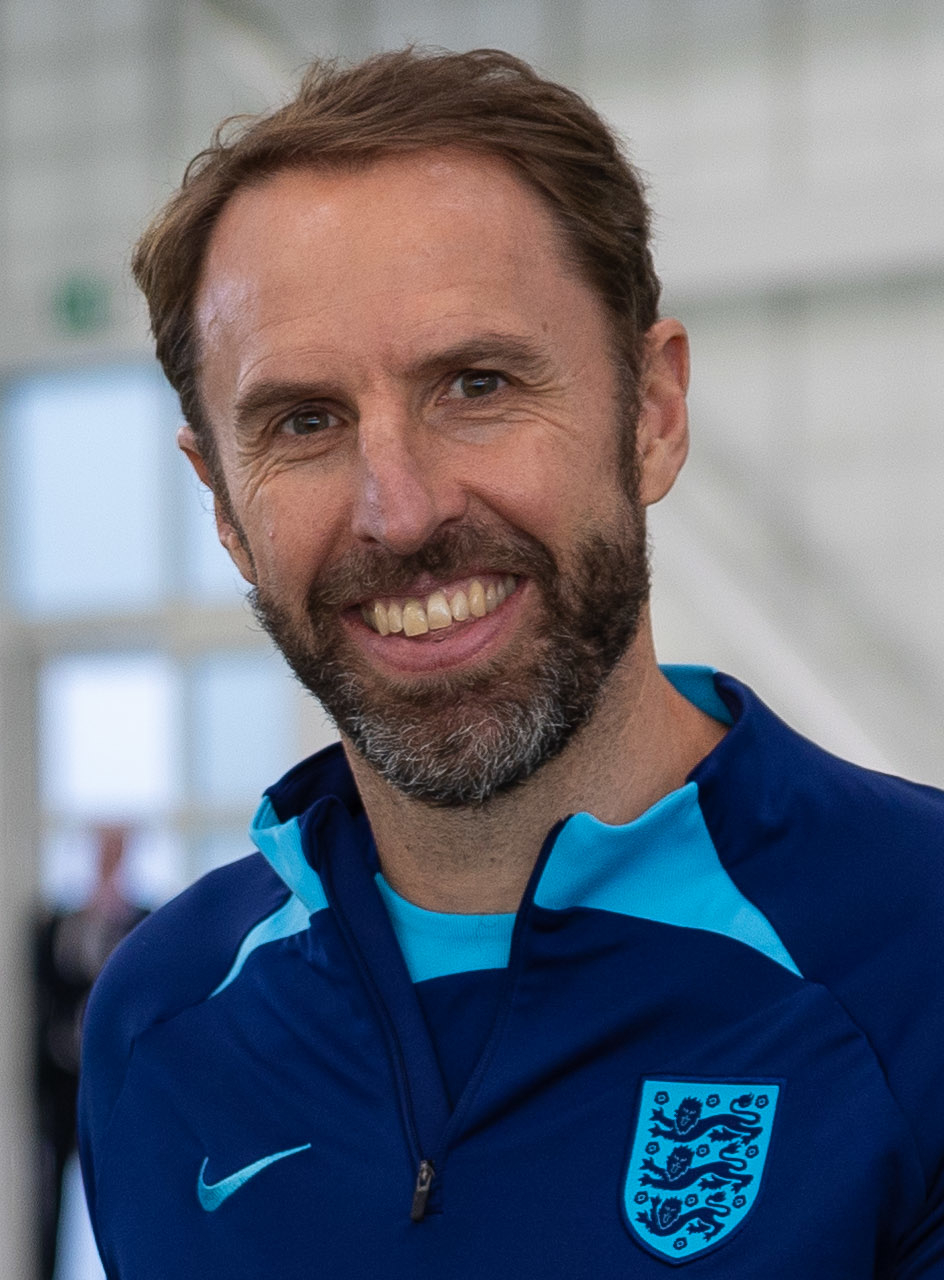
- Southgate with England in 2023

Personal information
- Full name: Gareth Southgate
- Date of birth: 3 September 1970 (age 56)
- Place of birth: Watford, England
- Height: 6 ft 0 in (1.83 m)
- Positions: Defender; midfielder

Youth career
- Southampton
- Crystal Palace

Senior career*
Years	Team	Apps	(Gls)
1988–1995	Crystal Palace	152	(15)
1995–2001	Aston Villa	191	(7)
2001–2006	Middlesbrough	160	(4)
Total		503	(26)

International career
1995–2004	England	57	(2)

Managerial career
- 2006–2009: Middlesbrough
- 2013–2016: England U21
- 2016–2024: England
Medal record
Men's football
Representing England (as manager)
UEFA European Championship
Runner-up	2020 Europe
Runner-up	2024 Germany
UEFA Nations League
Third place	2019 Portugal
- * Club domestic league appearances and goals

Sir Gareth Southgate (born 3 September 1970) is an English former professional football manager and player, who played as a defender and midfielder. He managed the England national team from 2016 to 2024.

An academy player at Crystal Palace, Southgate made his senior debut for the club in 1990, and was appointed club captain in 1993, winning the First Division championship that season (1993–94). Having made over 150 appearances for Palace, he was signed by Aston Villa in 1995, winning the League Cup in 1996 and reaching the 2000 FA Cup final, before departing for Middlesbrough, where he was appointed captain in 2002 and won another League Cup in 2004, as well as reaching the 2006 UEFA Cup final. Internationally, Southgate made 57 appearances for the England team between 1995 and 2004. He played every game of England's campaign in UEFA Euro 1996, though his penalty miss sent England out in the semi-final; he also featured in the 1998 FIFA World Cup and UEFA Euro 2000. He retired in 2006 at the age of 35, having made more than 500 league appearances across his three clubs.

Immediately following his retirement, Southgate was appointed manager of Middlesbrough, staying in the role until his dismissal in 2009. He also managed the England under-21 team from 2013 to 2016, before succeeding Sam Allardyce as the senior team's manager in 2016. He led England to the 2018 FIFA World Cup semi-finals, the UEFA Euro 2020 final, the 2022 FIFA World Cup quarter-finals, and the UEFA Euro 2024 final. In 2018 and 2021 he won the BBC Sports Personality of the Year Coach Award.

== Early life and education ==
Gareth Southgate was born on 3 September 1970 in Watford, Hertfordshire. He attended Padnell Infant School in Cowplain, Hampshire, along with Pound Hill Junior School and Hazelwick School in Crawley, West Sussex. As a schoolboy he supported Manchester United and his football hero was Bryan Robson. He left school with eight O-Levels at grades between A and C. He studied at Croydon College between 1987 and 1989, successfully completing a City & Guilds Certificate in Recreation and Leisure Industries as part of The Footballers Further Education & Vocational Training Society Youth Training Scheme.

== Club career ==
=== Crystal Palace ===
Southgate played as a youth for two and a half years for Southampton before being released as a thirteen-year-old. He subsequently joined Crystal Palace, making his professional debut as a substitute in a Football League Cup tie against Southend United in October 1990. His league debut came against Liverpool in March 1991. Southgate became a regular in the first team during the 1991–92 season, making 39 appearances.

Southgate became captain at the age of 23 and led the club to the 1993–94 First Division title, scoring nine goals from central midfield. After the South London club's relegation from the Premier League in 1995, Southgate moved to Aston Villa for a fee of £2.5 million.

Southgate's nickname at Palace was "Nord", given to him because his precise way of speaking reminded coach Wally Downes of Denis Norden's vocal delivery.

=== Aston Villa ===
Southgate made 191 appearances for Aston Villa over six seasons. At the club, Southgate was converted into a centre-back and was part of a formidable defence. In his first season, he lifted the League Cup and Aston Villa qualified for the UEFA Cup. Southgate played in every Premier League game during the 1998–99 season. He continued to play for Villa in the 1999–2000 season as the club reached the FA Cup final, but handed in a transfer request just before playing for England at Euro 2000, saying that "if I am to achieve in my career, it is time to move on."

=== Middlesbrough ===
On 11 July 2001, Southgate signed for Middlesbrough for a £6.5 million fee. He joined on a four-year deal and was the first signing by Steve McClaren, whom he knew as an England coach.

In July 2002, after Paul Ince left for Wolverhampton Wanderers, Southgate was appointed the new Middlesbrough captain. On 29 February 2004, he became the first Boro skipper in their 128-year history to lift a trophy, as they defeated Bolton Wanderers in the League Cup final at the Millennium Stadium.

Southgate rejected media rumours that he was set to move to Manchester United following Rio Ferdinand's ban for missing a drug test in January 2004. He later committed his final playing years to Middlesbrough, signing until 2007. His final appearance as a professional player was in the 2006 UEFA Cup final against Sevilla, which Middlesbrough lost 4–0 at the Philips Stadion in Eindhoven.

== International career ==
Southgate made his debut for England as a substitute against Portugal in December 1995 under the management of Terry Venables, heading the ball against the crossbar with his first international touch. Southgate played every minute of their matches as hosts England reached the semi-final of UEFA Euro 1996, in which they faced Germany. The match was determined in a penalty shoot-out; Southgate's penalty was saved, and England were eliminated when Andreas Möller scored the next German penalty. Southgate made light of his blunder later that year by appearing in an advert for Pizza Hut, also featuring Stuart Pearce and Chris Waddle, who had missed crucial penalties at the 1990 FIFA World Cup.

Southgate also played in the 1998 FIFA World Cup and UEFA Euro 2000. His 50th cap came in a 1–1 draw with Portugal at Villa Park in September 2002. On 11 June 2003, he played the full 90 minutes in a 2–1 Euro 2004 qualifying win over Slovakia at his club ground of the Riverside Stadium, competing against Middlesbrough's striker Szilárd Németh.

Southgate was capped 57 times for England and scored twice. His first goal came on 14 October 1998 against Luxembourg in a Euro 2000 qualifier, his second on 22 May 2003 against South Africa in a friendly. He is Aston Villa's most capped England player, having played 42 of his 57 internationals whilst with Villa.

== Managerial career ==
=== Middlesbrough ===
==== 2006–07 season ====
Middlesbrough manager Steve McClaren left the club in June 2006 to replace Sven-Göran Eriksson as the manager of the England national team. Although Martin O'Neill was initially the favourite for the new vacancy, Southgate was chosen by chairman Steve Gibson to succeed McClaren, committing to a five-year contract. As Southgate did not have the required coaching qualifications (the UEFA Pro Licence) to manage a top-flight club, he could only be appointed initially for twelve weeks, but he was allowed to stay on as manager after receiving a special dispensation from the Premier League board in November 2006. Middlesbrough successfully argued that, because Southgate had recently been an international player, he had had no opportunity to undertake the coaching courses. Southgate subsequently went on to complete his coaching qualifications.

Upon his appointment, Southgate was tasked with rebuilding a side that had sold several players at the end of the previous league campaign, including key players such as Jimmy Floyd Hasselbaink and Doriva. His first signing as a manager came on 12 July, when Herold Goulon signed from Lyon for an undisclosed fee. He brought in four defensive additions to the squad, with Julio Arca arriving from local rivals Sunderland, Robert Huth from Chelsea and Jason Euell from Charlton Athletic on permanent deals, whereas Jonathan Woodgate joined on a season-long loan from Real Madrid. After playing eleven games in their pre-season campaign, Southgate's managerial reign kicked off on 19 August 2006, the first day of the Premier League season, where his side lost 3–2 away at Reading. Despite a disappointing start, they redeemed themselves when hosting reigning champions Chelsea at the Riverside Stadium, the game ending in a 2–1 victory.

During Southgate's first season in charge, the side secured some promising victories, but lost away from home to all three newly promoted sides. Furthermore, it took until January for the team to register their first away win of the season, a 3–1 victory at an out-of-form Charlton Athletic, their first away success since April of the previous year. Their highest-scoring victory of the season was a 5–1 win over Bolton Wanderers. Southgate's side finished the Premier League season sat in twelfth position. That season also saw the club eliminated from the League Cup at the earliest possibility, suffering a 1–0 defeat to Notts County in the first round. In the FA Cup, the club had a replay in every round they participated in. They were eventually eliminated by Manchester United in the sixth round of the competition, suffering a 3–2 aggregate loss. Due to every possible match going to a replay, Middlesbrough actually played more competition matches than the previous season's champions Liverpool.

==== 2007–08 season ====
Middlesbrough were very active during both transfer windows, with Jonathan Woodgate being the first signing during the summer, arriving from Real Madrid for a £7 million transfer fee; Woodgate had previously played for the club during the previous league campaign on loan. The club went on to break their personal transfer record, for the first time since 2002, when Afonso Alves arrived from Heerenveen for €20 million.

In December 2007, Arsenal manager Arsène Wenger suggested Southgate as one of several English managers who were "all good enough" to manage the national team. Southgate had faced some criticism earlier on that season, after his side suffered a spell in the relegation zone, but Middlesbrough managed to pull clear of the bottom three. Southgate would go on to guide his side to a thirteenth-place finish in the Premier League; their final game of the league campaign saw them secure an 8–1 victory against Manchester City at home, the club's biggest victory in the Premier League era, and Southgate's largest margin of victory in management.

==== 2008–09 season: Relegation and dismissal ====
The pre-season build-up ahead of the 2008–09 season was disappointing for the club. Due to heavy spending during the previous season, the club's net spending was almost nil. Furthermore, club legend Mark Schwarzer left the club after eleven years, joining Premier League rivals Fulham on the expiration of his contract. Furthermore, key players such as George Boateng and Lee Cattermole also left the club, once again leaving Southgate with a rebuilding challenge to change Middlesbrough's fortunes. Despite the negative events during pre-season, Middlesbrough secured two victories out of a possible three, resulting in Southgate being named the Premier League Manager of the Month for August. This made Southgate the second person, after Stuart Pearce, to achieve both the Player and Manager of the Month awards, and he became the first Middlesbrough manager to win the award since Terry Venables in January 2001.

In November 2008, Southgate took Middlesbrough up to eighth place in the league, following an away win against an in-form Aston Villa, another former playing club of Southgate's; however, Middlesbrough then went fourteen games without a win, until they beat Liverpool at home 2–0 on 28 February 2009. After an away defeat against Stoke City, some of the travelling supporters were calling for his dismissal, having only achieved a single win in eighteen games and survival from relegation looking highly unlikely. On 24 March, chairman Steve Gibson spoke out on the manager's future, stating that sacking Southgate "would not help the situation".

Due to results elsewhere, Middlesbrough's status as a Premier League club went down to the final day: they needed relegation rivals Newcastle United and Hull City to lose, with them needing a five-goal swing to the latter in goal difference. Middlesbrough faced West Ham United away from home; the game ended in a 2–1 defeat, confirming Middlesbrough's relegation to the Championship after eleven consecutive seasons in the top flight, as a 19th-place finish was confirmed. Following their relegation, Southgate expressed his determination to achieve instant promotion back up to the Premier League, praising the supporters and showing his sorrow for them in the process.

Middlesbrough's Championship campaign started strongly, putting them in contention for an immediate return to the Premier League. However, on 20 October 2009, shortly after a 2–0 victory over Derby County and with the club in fourth place, Southgate was dismissed as manager. His dismissal was controversial as he had taken Middlesbrough to within one point of the top position, though chairman Gibson stated that he had made the decision weeks previously in the best interests of the club. He was replaced by Gordon Strachan, who was unable to take the club back to the Premier League. Middlesbrough would have to wait until 2016 to achieve promotion to the Premier League, under the management of Aitor Karanka.

=== England ===
==== 2013–2016: Tenure with the under-21s ====
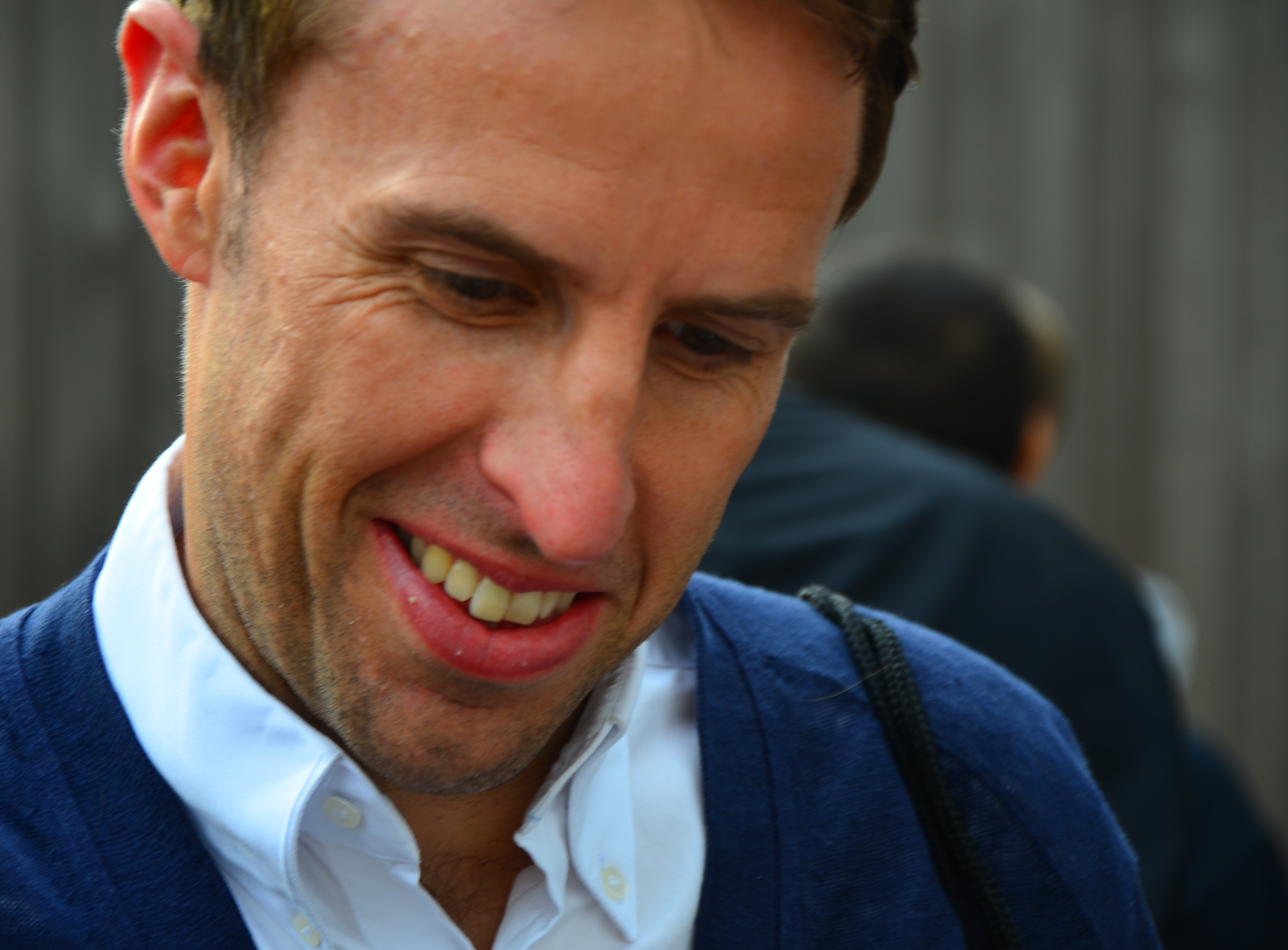
Southgate in 2013

After four years out of football, Southgate returned to management after he signed a three-year contract to succeed Stuart Pearce as the manager of the England under-21 team on 22 August 2013. Senior team manager Roy Hodgson had taken charge for the team's 6–0 victory over Scotland in the interim period prior to Southgate's appointment. His first game in charge saw the Young Lions defeat Moldova 1–0 in a UEFA European Championship qualification match, thanks to a goal from striker Saido Berahino.

Southgate went on to lead his team to qualify for the finals of the 2015 European Championship; their good fortune could not continue, however, as they finished bottom of their narrow-pointed group, therefore being knocked out of the competition. Their only victory during the competition came when Jesse Lingard scored the singular goal in their 1–0 success over Sweden, who went on to qualify for the competition's knockout phase.

In June 2016, Southgate said that he did not want to fill the England senior team position left vacant by Hodgson.

==== 2016–2017: Promotion to senior team role ====
Southgate was put in temporary charge of the senior England team on 27 September 2016, when Sam Allardyce resigned. England were in the early stages of qualifying for the 2018 FIFA World Cup. After winning his first game in charge 2–0 against Malta, under Southgate's leadership, England went on to draw 0–0 with Slovenia, beat Scotland 3–0, and in his last game in temporary charge, drew 2–2 with Spain, despite leading 2–0 and conceding goals in the 89th and 96th minutes. Southgate's spell as caretaker manager ended on 15 November, with him appointed on a permanent basis when he penned a four-year contract two weeks later.

==== 2018 World Cup ====
Southgate with England at the 2018 FIFA World Cup

The England team qualified for the 2018 FIFA World Cup on 5 October 2017 after a 1–0 home win over Slovenia. The Football Association confirmed in December that Southgate would remain as England manager even if the team did not progress beyond the group stage of the tournament, describing their expectations as "realistic" and the tournament as "a really important staging post for our development".

After wins against Tunisia and Panama saw England qualify behind Belgium in their group, Southgate's England beat Colombia 4–3 on penalties in the round of 16 after a 1–1 draw on 3 July 2018 to claim his nation's first ever World Cup penalty shoot-out victory and a place in the quarter-finals. England then defeated Sweden 2–0 in the quarter-finals on 7 July, with Southgate becoming the first England manager to reach the semi-finals of a World Cup since Bobby Robson in 1990. This success bought Southgate significant admiration from England fans. For the semi-final with Croatia, fans dressed up in waistcoats in tribute to Southgate's iconic waistcoat, which he wore during England's matches: retailer Marks & Spencer reported a 35% increase in sales of waistcoats, and the hashtag 'WaistcoatWednesday' trended on Twitter.

On 11 July 2018, Southgate's England side suffered a 2–1 defeat to Croatia during extra time in the semi-finals. Kieran Trippier opened the scoring for England with a free kick, before a goal from Ivan Perišić sent the tie into extra time. Mario Mandžukić scored the winner for Croatia in the second half of extra time. With England trailing, the match also saw England play the final ten minutes of extra time with ten men as Trippier suffered an injury after Southgate had already made his permitted substitutions. Following a 2–0 defeat to Belgium in the third place play-off, England ended the World Cup in fourth place. Harry Kane, a striker and the England team captain, won the Golden Boot as the tournament's top goal-scorer.

A week after the end of the tournament, Southgate tube station in Enfield, London, was renamed "Gareth Southgate" for two days in recognition of Southgate's achievement. Southgate was also lauded for personal qualities shown in the World Cup, including consoling Colombia's Mateus Uribe, whose missed penalty had seen England win.

==== 2018–19 UEFA Nations League ====
In 2019, Southgate managed England to third place in the inaugural UEFA Nations League. They did so after finishing top of a group containing Spain and Croatia. Their 3–2 victory away against the Spanish was their first victory in Spain for 31 years. They lost 3–1 to the Netherlands in the semi-final but then beat Switzerland 6–5 in a penalty shootout after the third-place match finished goalless. It was England's first third-place finish in a major international tournament since UEFA Euro 1968.

==== UEFA Euro 2020 ====
At UEFA Euro 2020, England finished top of Group D which included Croatia, Scotland and the Czech Republic, beating Croatia 1–0 to start the European Championship with a win for England for the first time, drawing Scotland 0–0, and winning against the Czech Republic 1–0, with forward Raheem Sterling scoring both goals. In the round of 16, England defeated Germany 2–0 at Wembley Stadium with two late goals from Sterling and Kane, their first knockout phase win at the European Championships (as their only previous victory was defeating Spain on penalties in UEFA Euro 1996). This was also their first win over Germany in a knockout match since the 1966 FIFA World Cup final.

In the quarter-final tie, Southgate's England team beat Ukraine 4–0 at the Stadio Olimpico in Rome to reach the semi-finals of a major competition for the fifth time. In the semi-final, England beat Denmark 2–1 at Wembley Stadium and reached the final of the European Championships for the first time. It was only the second time that England had reached any major tournament's final. In the final at Wembley Stadium, an early goal from defender Luke Shaw saw England lead 1–0, before Italy's Leonardo Bonucci levelled the match in the 67th minute. With the scores unchanged after extra time, England ultimately lost the match 3–2 on penalties.

==== Build up to 2022 World Cup ====
In September 2021, England tied their highest FIFA ranking position at 3rd. In November 2021, Southgate led England to World Cup qualification following a 10–0 win over San Marino. A week later he signed a new contract which meant he would remain the England manager until December 2024. In June 2022, Southgate led England into the UEFA Nations League. England drew three of their matches in the competition and lost the other three, which included a 4–0 defeat to Hungary on 14 June 2022. This was the country's worst home defeat since 1928. On 23 September 2022, following a 1–0 defeat to Italy, England were relegated to League B.

==== 2022 World Cup ====
England won their group at the 2022 FIFA World Cup, with wins against both Iran and Wales, and a goalless draw with the United States. In the round of 16, England beat Senegal 3–0, advancing to the quarter-finals, where they lost 2–1 to France. In the immediate aftermath of this defeat, Southgate expressed doubts about continuing as England manager. On 18 December 2022, the FA confirmed Southgate would remain in post until after the UEFA Euro 2024.

==== UEFA Euro 2024 ====
On 17 October 2023, England secured qualification to UEFA Euro 2024 with two games remaining. During the qualification campaign, England recorded their first home and away victories over Italy since 1977 and 1961 respectively. England finished top of their qualification group, as they remained unbeaten throughout the calendar year.

During the tournament, England won Group C with 5 points out of a possible 9, qualifying for the knock out rounds with a game to spare. Southgate and the players were criticised after the 1–1 draw with Denmark in the second game; Southgate responded that he "blank[s] out criticism." After a goalless draw with Slovenia in the last group game, England topped their group. The team was booed, and Southgate was struck with objects from the crowd; he stated he understood fans' frustration but felt that the "negativity" was harming the players.

In the round of 16, England beat Slovakia after equalising through a Jude Bellingham overhead kick in added time, before Harry Kane headed the winner in the first minute of extra time. England's quarter-final against Switzerland ended in a 1–1 draw before England scored all five of their attempts in the penalty shootout and progressed to the next round. In the post-match press conference, Southgate said "Every now and then there has to be some enjoyment in this job and if you can't enjoy that moment, the whole thing is a waste of time. I can't deny [that] when [the criticism] is as personal as it has been, on a human level it's difficult but we're fighting and we're not going to stop fighting."

In the semi-final against the Netherlands, Xavi Simons scored after seven minutes to put the Dutch team ahead, while Harry Kane scored a penalty equaliser after being fouled by Denzel Dumfries; substitute Ollie Watkins scored a late winner for England.

England lost the final 2–1 to Spain after a late winner from Mikel Oyarzabal. Former England captain Alan Shearer commented that Southgate could leave "with his head held high", having improved England's results since the nadir of elimination by Iceland at UEFA Euro 2016, but that he "wasn't quite able to get the best out of this team in Germany, and that was the difference between us reaching another final and winning one".

Two days after the final, Southgate submitted to the Football Association his resignation as England manager. In a statement, Southgate said: "As a proud Englishman, it has been the honour of my life to play for England and to manage England. It has meant everything to me, and I have given it my all. But it's time for change, and for a new chapter". He managed 102 games in total for England.

== Other roles ==
In 2003, Southgate and his close friend Andy Woodman co-wrote Woody & Nord: A Football Friendship. This book describes an enduring friendship forged in the Crystal Palace youth team that has survived Southgate and Woodman's wildly differing fortunes in the professional game. The book won the Sports Book of the Year award for 2004 from the National Sporting Club (now the British Sports Book Awards). He wrote a further book, Anything Is Possible: Be Brave, Be Kind & Follow Your Dreams, published in November 2020.

Southgate was also a co-commentator for ITV Sport at the 2006 World Cup, covering group games alongside Clive Tyldesley. Due to commitments of managing Middlesbrough, he attended for only the first two weeks of the four-week tournament. He resumed a role as pundit and co-commentator after he finished his tenure at Middlesbrough in 2010, working on FA Cup and UEFA Champions League matches for ITV as well as acting as a pundit on England games.

In January 2011, Southgate was appointed as the FA's head of elite development, to work with Trevor Brooking. He left the post in July 2012, and ruled himself out of consideration for the role of technical director, for which he had been a leading candidate.

Southgate is an Ambassador for The Prince's Trust and Patron of Help for Heroes.

After stepping down as England manager, Southgate was appointed a visiting lecturer at Harvard Business School. His third book, Dear England: Lessons on Leadership, was published in November 2025. In October 2026 Southgate said that he had rarely watched football matches since leaving the England job, and that he had not attended a match since watching his boyhood club Crystal Palace win the 2025 FA Cup final.

== Style of management ==
Southgate's style of management whilst in charge of England was described as embodying principles of "empowering coaching" and elements of "transformational leadership". He was praised for his man management and for creating a "cohesive, positive culture" within the England squad. He was also credited for the promotion of players from England's youth squads into the senior international team.

As England manager, Southgate often adapted the team's formation depending on the opposition, using the 4–3–3, 4–2–3–1, 3–4–3 and 3–5–2 formations. The formation used at the 2018 World Cup was described as both a 3–5–2 and, alternatively, a "unique 3–3–2–2".

Southgate was criticised for England's perceived "pragmatic" and "conservative" style of play, as well as for his in-game management. He was also criticised for selecting out of form players, with some commentators accusing him of "favouritism".

== Personal life ==
Southgate married Alison Bird in July 1997 at St Nicholas Church in Worth; the couple have two children. Southgate and his family have resided in the spa town of Harrogate, North Yorkshire, since the early 2000s, owning many homes in and around the town, including a grand Victorian townhouse on the Duchy Estate, before settling in a £3.75 million country house 8 miles from the town centre.

Southgate was appointed Officer of the Order of the British Empire (OBE) in the 2019 New Year Honours for services to football.

On 13 November 2019, Southgate was named an Honorary Yorkshireman by Welcome to Yorkshire. The honour is given to 'inspirational individuals who have made a big impact on Yorkshire, despite being born outside the county lines'.

In April 2020, during the COVID-19 pandemic, Southgate agreed to take a 30% salary cut.

In December 2024, Southgate was appointed Knight Bachelor in the 2025 New Year Honours.

== In popular culture ==
Beginning with the 2018 World Cup, England supporters adapted the chorus of the 2001 hit single "Whole Again" by English pop girl group Atomic Kitten as a chant for Southgate. The song had previously been adapted by Celtic fans earlier in the 2017–18 season in honour of defender Mikael Lustig.

Looking back on when we first met
I cannot escape and I cannot forget
Southgate, you're the one – you still turn me on
"Football's coming home again"

During the World Cup before England's quarter-final against Sweden, Atomic Kitten member Natasha Hamilton shared a video of herself on Twitter singing the alternate lyrics. On 3 July 2021, Hamilton and fellow member Liz McClarnon then returned to perform the song with reworked lyrics including the existing alternate ones before chanting England fans at a watch party at Boxpark Croydon for the Euro 2020 quarter-final against Ukraine. On 6 July 2021, the day before England's semi-final against Denmark, the group released an official full-length version of the adapted song called "Southgate You're The One (Football's Coming Home Again)" via Columbia Records UK. Member Jenny Frost rejoined the band for the first time since 2008 for the remix/re-recording.

In 2023, Dear England, a play about Southgate, appeared at London's Royal National Theatre. Written by James Graham, it starred Joseph Fiennes as Southgate. Dear England was later adapted into a television series.

== Career statistics ==
=== Club ===
Appearances and goals by club, season and competition
Club	Season	League			FA Cup		League Cup		Europe		Other		Total	
Club	Season	Division	Apps	Goals	Apps	Goals	Apps	Goals	Apps	Goals	Apps	Goals	Apps	Goals
Crystal Palace	1990–91	First Division	1	0	0	0	1	0	–		1 (Note: Appearances in Full Members' Cup)	0	3	0
Crystal Palace	1991–92	First Division	30	0	0	0	6	0	–		3	0	39	0
Crystal Palace	1992–93	Premier League	33	3	0	0	6	2	–		–		39	5
Crystal Palace	1993–94	First Division	46	9	1	0	4	3	2 (Note: Appearances in Anglo-Italian Cup)	0	–		53	12
Crystal Palace	1994–95	Premier League	42	3	8	0	7	2	–		–		57	5
Crystal Palace	Total		152	15	9	0	24	7	2	0	4	0	191	22
Aston Villa	1995–96	Premier League	31	1	4	0	8	1	–		–		43	2
Aston Villa	1996–97	Premier League	28	1	3	0	1	0	2 (Note: Appearances in UEFA Cup)	0	–		34	1
Aston Villa	1997–98	Premier League	32	0	3	0	1	0	7	0	–		43	0
Aston Villa	1998–99	Premier League	38	1	2	0	0	0	4	0	–		44	2
Aston Villa	1999–2000	Premier League	31	2	6	1	6	0	–		–		43	3
Aston Villa	2000–01	Premier League	31	2	2	0	1	0	2 (Note: Appearances in UEFA Intertoto Cup)	0	–		36	2
Aston Villa	Total		191	7	20	1	17	1	15	0	–		243	8
Middlesbrough	2001–02	Premier League	37	1	6	0	1	0	–		–		44	1
Middlesbrough	2002–03	Premier League	36	2	1	0	0	0	–		–		37	2
Middlesbrough	2003–04	Premier League	27	1	1	0	6	0	–		–		34	1
Middlesbrough	2004–05	Premier League	36	0	1	0	0	0	10	0	–		47	0
Middlesbrough	2005–06	Premier League	24	0	7	0	2	0	9	0	–		42	0
Middlesbrough	Total		160	4	16	0	9	0	19	0	–		204	4
Career total			503	26	45	1	50	8	36	0	4	0	638	35

=== International ===
Appearances and goals by national team and year
National team	Year	Apps	Goals
England	1995	1	0
England	1996	11	0
England	1997	10	0
England	1998	8	1
England	1999	3	0
England	2000	8	0
England	2001	3	0
England	2002	7	0
England	2003	4	1
England	2004	2	0
Total		57	2

Scores and results list England's goal tally first, score column indicates score after each Southgate goal

List of international goals scored by Gareth Southgate
No.	Date	Venue	Opponent	Score	Result	Competition
1	14 October 1998	Stade Josy Barthel, Luxembourg City, Luxembourg	Luxembourg	3–0	3–0	UEFA Euro 2000 qualifying
2	22 May 2003	Kings Park Stadium, Durban, South Africa	South Africa	1–0	2–1	Friendly

=== Managerial ===
As of match played 14 July 2024

Managerial record by team and tenure
Team	From	To	Record					Ref.
Team	From	To	P	W	D	L	Win %	Ref.
Middlesbrough	7 June 2006	21 October 2009	151	45	43	63	29.80	
England U21	22 August 2013	27 September 2016	37	21	4	12	56.76	
England	27 September 2016	16 July 2024	102	61	24	17	59.80	
Total			290	127	71	92	43.79	

== Honours ==
=== Player ===
Crystal Palace

- Football League First Division: 1993–94

Aston Villa

- Football League Cup: 1995–96
- FA Cup runner-up: 1999–2000

Middlesbrough

- Football League Cup: 2003–04
- UEFA Cup runner-up: 2005–06

England

- Tournoi de France: 1997

Individual

- Premier League Player of the Month: January 2000

=== Manager ===
England U21

- Toulon Tournament: 2016

England

- UEFA European Championship runner-up: 2020, 2024
- UEFA Nations League third place: 2018–19

Individual

- Premier League Manager of the Month: August 2008
- BBC Sports Personality of the Year Coach Award: 2018 and 2021
- FWA Tribute Award: 2019
- PFA Merit Award: 2025

=== State ===
- Officer of the Order of the British Empire: 2019
- Knight Bachelor: 2025

== See also ==
- National team managers with 100 or more matches
- England national football team manager
