= James Graham (playwright) =

British playwright and television writer

James Graham OBE FRSL
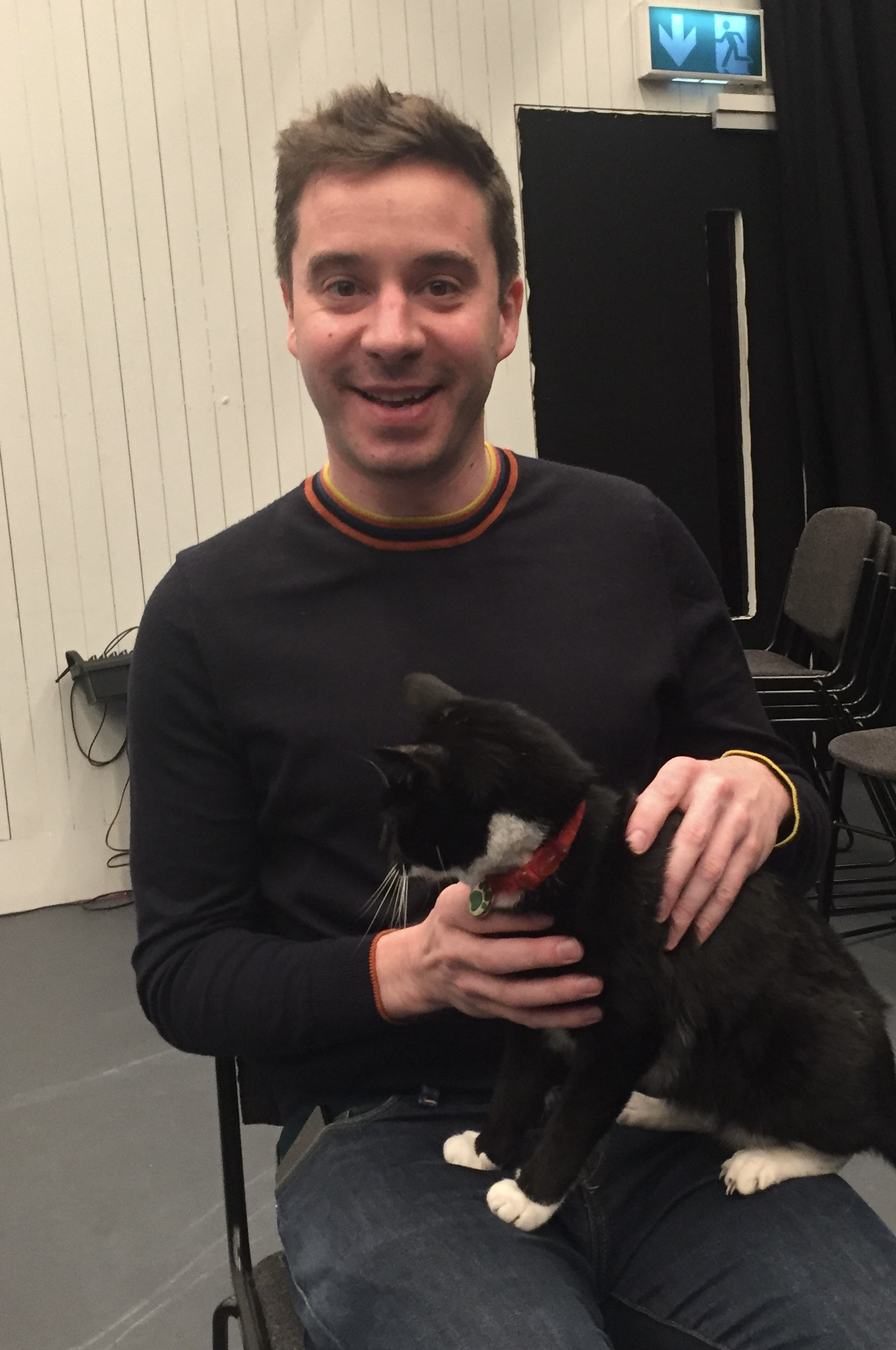
- Graham in 2019
- Born: 8 July 1982 (age 44); Mansfield, Nottinghamshire, England
- Education: Ashfield Comprehensive School; University of Hull
- Writing career
- Genres: Political drama, comedy
- Notable awards: Laurence Olivier Award

James Graham OBE FRSL (born 8 July 1982) is a British playwright and screenwriter. His work has been staged throughout the UK and internationally, at theatres including the Bush, Soho Theatre, Almeida Theatre, Royal Court Theatre, Liverpool and the National Theatre and has had multiple plays in the West End and on Broadway.

Graham is a three-time Laurence Olivier Award winner.

== Early life and education ==
James Graham grew up in Kirkby-in-Ashfield, Nottinghamshire, and was educated at Ashfield School, Kirkby-in-Ashfield and the University of Hull, where he studied drama.

== Career ==
Graham's first professional play, Albert's Boy, was produced by the Finborough Theatre in west London, where Graham became playwright-in-residence. His first major play This House was commissioned by the Royal National Theatre, transferred to the larger Olivier Theatre, and was nominated for the Olivier Award for Best New Play. This House was revived in 2016 and ran for two years, first in the West End and then on a national tour.

Graham's debut feature film X+Y premiered in 2015. He has written numerous TV dramas, including the TV films Coalition (which won the Royal Television Society award for Best Single Film) and Brexit: The Uncivil War (nominated for the Primetime Emmy Award for Outstanding Television Movie). In 2019, Graham wrote and executive produced a three-part TV adaptation of his stage play Quiz, which aired in 2020.

In 2022, it was announced that Graham had written the book for a new musical about the life of televangelist Tammy Faye Messner, with Elton John and Jake Shears writing the music. Tammy Faye opened at the Almeida Theatre in October 2022, and was nominated for four Olivier Awards, winning two. Tammy Faye transferred to Broadway in October 2024 and closed two months later.

He has received five Broadway productions. He wrote the books for Broadway musical Finding Neverland, and for the musical Tammy Faye which transferred to Broadway from London. His play Punch opens on Broadway in September 2025, following Broadway transfers of his plays Privacy and Ink (for which he received his first Tony Award nomination).

In 2023, he wrote Dear England for the National Theatre, starring Joseph Fiennes, a portrait of England footballer and team manager Gareth Southgate. Dear England transferred to the West End, followed by a UK tour, and was announced by the BBC announced they had commissioned Graham to adapt the play into a TV drama series which will air on 30 May 2026.

James Graham gave the James MacTaggart Memorial Lecture at the 2024 Edinburgh TV Festival. He criticised the lack of opportunities for people from working class backgrounds in the British television industry, citing that only 8% of people in the industry are from a working class background. His lecture led to the development of the Class and Social Equality Working Group, consisting of TV professionals from across the industry that are dedicated to finding practical actions to redress the class balance in the TV industry.

In 2025, his play Make It Happen was performed at the Dundee Rep Theatre and the Edinburgh International Festival, starring Sandy Grierson as Fred Goodwin, former CEO of the Royal Bank of Scotland, and Brian Cox as Adam Smith. Also in 2025, his play Punch was produced by the Manhattan Theatre Club and performed at Broadway’s Samuel J. Friedman Theatre.

In September 2026 the National Theatre announced that Major, Graham's play following John Major's ascendance to the office of prime minister, would premiere at the theatre during its spring/summer 2027 season. Jeremy Herrin, who also directed This House, is set to direct.

== Personal life ==
In March 2024, he was the guest on the long running BBC Radio 4 series Desert Island Discs, hosted by Lauren Laverne. During his appearance, Graham said he has had relationships with women and men.

== Work ==
=== Film ===
Year	Title	Director	Notes	Ref.
2015	X+Y	Morgan Matthews	Theatrical film	
2026	Ink	Danny Boyle	Theatrical film	

=== Television ===
Year	Title	Network	Notes	Ref.
2015	Coalition	Channel 4	Television film	
2019	Brexit: The Uncivil War	Channel 4	Television film	
2019	The Crown	Netflix	Episode: "Tywysog Cymru"	
2020	Quiz	ITV	miniseries	
2022–	Sherwood	BBC1	Drama series	
2024	The Way	BBC1	Dystopian series	
2025	Brian and Maggie	Channel 4	Miniseries	
2026	Dear England	BBC	Miniseries	

=== Theatre ===
Year	Title	Notes	Ref.
2005	Albert's Boy	premiered at the Finborough Theatre	
2006	Eden's Empire	premiered at the Finborough Theatre	
2007	Little Madam	premiered at the Finborough Theatre	
2008	Sons of York	premiered at the Finborough Theatre	
2008	Tory Boyz	premiered at the Soho Theatre	
2009	SuddenLossOfDignity.Com	premiered at the Bush Theatre (Note: In collaboration with Zawe Ashton, Joel Horwood, Morgan Lloyd Malcolm and Michelle Terry)	
2009	A History of Falling Things	premiered at the Clwyd Theatr Cymru	
2010	The Whisky Taster	premiered at the Bush Theatre	
2010	The Man	premiered at the Finborough Theatre	
2010	Relish	premiered at the Tramshed in Shoreditch	
2010	Basset	National Theatre Connections play	
2011	Sixty Six Books	Co-author; premiered at the Bush Theatre	
2012	This House	premiered at the National Theatre	
2014	Privacy	premiered at the Donmar Warehouse; transferred to Off-Broadway	
2014	The Angry Brigade	premiered at Theatre Royal, Plymouth	
2014	Finding Neverland	premiered at the A.R.T.	
2015	The Children's Monologues	One-off event at the Royal Court Theatre (Note: wrote the monologue "Biyonace")	
2015	The Vote	premiered at the Donmar Warehouse	
2016	Monster Raving Loony	premiered at the Theatre Royal, Plymouth	
2017	Ink	premiered at the Almeida Theatre; transferred to the West End and Broadway	
2017	Labour of Love	premiered at the Noël Coward Theatre	
2017	Quiz	premiered at the Minerva Theatre, Chichester; transferred to the West End	
2017	The Culture	premiered at the Hull Truck Theatre	
2018	Sketching	premiered at Wilton's Music Hall	
2020	Bubble	premiered at the Nottingham Playhouse	
2021	Best of Enemies	premiered at the Young Vic; transferred to the West End	
2021	Shoot	performed live at Alexandra Palace (Note: short play written for Sky Arts "Play in a Day" which was later broadcast on Sky Arts)	
2022	Tammy Faye	premiered at the Almeida Theatre, transferred to Broadway (Note: co-written with Elton John)	
2023	Town Planning in the Apocalypse	premiered at the Duke of York's Theatre (Note: short play written for the National Youth Theatre, performed in February 2023 as part of an all-night showcase of NYT students)	
2023	Dear England	premiered at the National Theatre	
2023	Boys from the Blackstuff	premiered at the Royal Court Theatre, Liverpool	
2024	Punch	premiered at Nottingham Playhouse and the Young Vic	
2025	Make it Happen	premiered at Edinburgh International Festival	
2026	The Standard of Living	Will premiere at Theatre Royal Haymarket in autumn 2026	

== Reception ==
For his 2025 play Punch, theatre critic Greg Evans writes that the play offers a "fine cast" and calls out Harrison's "tremendously affecting performance" but found the play too often felt "like a PSA for the restorative justice procedure."

In 2026 the New Statesman deemed him "the writer for our era."

== Recognition and honours ==
In 2018, Graham won his first Olivier Award: Best New Comedy for Labour of Love. His other play, Ink, was nominated for Best New Play in the same year. He won his second Olivier Award in 2024: Best New Play for Dear England. He won his third in 2026: Best New Play for Punch.

In June 2018, Graham was elected Fellow of the Royal Society of Literature in its "40 Under 40" initiative. In January 2019, Graham's life and work was the subject of an in-depth BBC One documentary as part of the Imagine series. In May 2019, his play This House was voted Play of the Decade in Bloomsbury Publishing's "60 Years of Modern Plays" public vote.

He was appointed Officer of the Order of the British Empire (OBE) in the 2020 New Year Honours for services to drama and young people in British theatre. In June 2024, the New Statesman included Graham in The Left Power List 2024, the magazine's "guide to the 50 most influential people in progressive politics".

Organisations	Year	Category	Work	Result	Ref.
BAFTA TV Awards	2022	Short Form Programme	People You May Know	Nominated	
BAFTA TV Awards	2023	Best Drama Series	Sherwood (season one)	Nominated	
BAFTA TV Awards	2025	Best Drama Series	Sherwood (season one)	Nominated	
Laurence Olivier Awards	2018	Best New Comedy	Labour of Love	Won	
Laurence Olivier Awards	2018	Best New Play	Ink	Nominated	
Laurence Olivier Awards	2024	Best New Play	Dear England	Won	
Laurence Olivier Awards	2026	Best New Play	Punch	Won	
Primetime Emmy Awards	2019	Outstanding Television Movie	Brexit	Nominated	

== See also ==
- List of British playwrights since 1950
