= 2026 Women's Six Nations Championship =

Women's rugby union competition

- Date: 11 April – 17 May 2026
- Countries: England; France; Ireland; Italy; Scotland; Wales

Tournament statistics
- Champions: England (22nd title)
- Grand Slam: England (20th title)
- Triple Crown: England (26th title)
- Matches played: 15
- Attendance: 279,760 (18,651 per match)
- Tries scored: 146 (9.73 per match)
- Top point scorer: (England) Zoe Harrison (59)
- Top try scorer: (England) Marlie Packer (7)
- Player of the tournament: Aoife Wafer (Ireland)
- Official website: Official website

The 2026 Women's Six Nations Championship (known as the Guinness Women's Six Nations for sponsorship purposes, except in France, and branded as W6N) is the 25th Women's Six Nations Championship, an annual rugby union competition featuring the women's national teams of England, France, Ireland, Italy, Scotland and Wales. It began on 11 April and concluded on 17 May 2026; with five teams setting national or tournament records for attendance, in addition to higher TV audience and wider reach being attained.

== Participants ==
Nation	Stadium			Coach	Captain	World Rugby Ranking	
Nation	Home stadium	Capacity	Location	Coach	Captain	Start (Note: As of 11 April 2026)	End (Note: As of 17 May 2026)
England	Ashton Gate	26,462	Bristol	(New Zealand) John Mitchell	Meg Jones	1	1
England	Twickenham Stadium	82,000	London	(New Zealand) John Mitchell	Meg Jones	1	1
France	Stade Marcel-Michelin	19,357	Clermont-Ferrand	(France) François Ratier	Manaé Feleu	4	4
France	Stade des Alpes	20,068	Grenoble	(France) François Ratier	Manaé Feleu	4	4
France	Matmut Atlantique Stadium	42,115	Bordeaux	(France) François Ratier	Manaé Feleu	4	4
Ireland	Dexcom Stadium	10,500	Galway	(England) Scott Bemand	Erin King	5	5
Ireland	Ravenhill Stadium	19,196	Belfast	(England) Scott Bemand	Erin King	5	5
Ireland	Aviva Stadium	51,711	Dublin	(England) Scott Bemand	Erin King	5	5
Italy	Stadio Sergio Lanfranchi	5,000	Parma	(Italy) Fabio Roselli	Elisa Giordano	9	6
Scotland	Edinburgh Rugby Stadium	7,800	Edinburgh	(Australia) Sione Fukofuka	Rachel Malcolm	6	7
Scotland	Murrayfield Stadium	67,144	Edinburgh	(Australia) Sione Fukofuka	Rachel Malcolm	6	7
Wales	Cardiff Arms Park	12,125	Cardiff	(Wales) Sean Lynn	Kate Williams	12	12
Wales	Millennium Stadium	73,931	Cardiff	(Wales) Sean Lynn	Kate Williams	12	12

== Table ==
Pos	Team	Pld	W	D	L	PF	PA	PD	TF	TA	GS	TB	LB	Pts	ENG	FRA	IRE	ITA	SCO	WAL
1	England	5	5	0	0	283	104	+179	42	16	3	5	0	28	—		33–12			62–24
2	France	5	4	0	1	201	92	+109	31	13	0	5	0	21	28–43	—	26–7	40–7		
3	Ireland	5	3	0	2	163	96	+67	25	16	0	3	0	15			—	57–20	54–5	33–12
4	Italy	5	2	0	3	144	196	−52	24	30	0	4	0	12	33–61			—	41–14	
5	Scotland	5	1	0	4	78	267	−189	11	41	0	1	0	5	7–84	28–69			—	
6	Wales	5	0	0	5	86	200	−114	14	31	0	2	1	3		7–34		24–43	19–24	—

Updated to match(es) played on 9 May 2026. Source: Six Nations
Legend: Blue = home team win; Yellow = draw; Red = away team win.

Table ranking rules

- Four points are awarded for a win.
- Two points are awarded for a draw.
- A bonus point is awarded to a team that scores four or more tries, or loses by seven points or fewer.
- Three bonus points are awarded to a team that wins all five of their matches (a Grand Slam). This ensures that a Grand Slam winning team would top the table with at least 23 points, as another team could lose one match while winning two bonus points and win the other four matches while winning four bonus points for a maximum of 22 points.
- Tiebreakers
  - If two or more teams are tied on table points, the team with the better points difference (points scored against points conceded) is ranked higher.
  - If the above tiebreaker fails to separate tied teams, the team that scores the higher number of total tries (including penalty tries) in their matches is ranked higher.
  - If two or more teams remain tied after applying the above tiebreakers then those teams will be placed at equal rank; if the tournament has concluded and more than one team is placed first then the title will be shared between them.

== Fixtures ==
The fixtures for the 2026 Six Nations were announced on 12 June 2025, with a new format where each day would feature a "triple header" of action, the first four rounds as Super Saturday, and a finale on Super Sunday in Round 5.

This edition will also feature standalone fixtures for Scotland and Ireland at their national home stadiums for the first time.

=== Round 1 ===
11 April 2026
13:25 CET

(1 BP) France	40–7	Italy
Try: Grando 20' m Arbez 43' c Brosseau 53' c Khalfaoui 59' c Murie 69' c Barrat 74' c Con: Arbez (5/6) 43', 54', 60', 69', 75'	Report	Try: Buso 77'; Con: D'Inca (1/1) 78'

Stade des Alpes, Grenoble
Attendance: 14,876
Referee: Aimee Barrett-Theron (South Africa)

FB	15	Pauline Barrat
RW	14	Anaïs Grando		(substituted off) 62'	(substituted on) 71'
OC	13	Joanna Grisez			(substituted off) 46'
IC	12	Gabrielle Vernier	(substituted off) 7'	(substituted on) 13'
LW	11	Léa Murie
FH	10	Carla Arbez
SH	9	Pauline Bourdon Sansus	(substituted off) 61'	(substituted on) 62'	(substituted off) 71'
N8	8	Manae Feleu (c)
OF	7	Léa Champon
BF	6	Axelle Berthoumieu	(substituted off) 61'
RL	5	Madoussou Fall-Raclot	(substituted off) 61'
LL	4	Kiara Zago	(substituted off) 49'
TP	3	Assia Khalfaoui	(substituted off) 61'
HK	2	Mathilde Lazarko	(substituted off) 61'
LP	1	Ambre Mwayembe	(substituted off) 48'
Replacements:
HK	16	Élisa Riffonneau	(substituted on) 61'
PR	17	Yllana Brosseau	(substituted on) 48'
PR	18	Rose Bernadou	(substituted on) 61'
LK	19	Cloe Correa	(substituted on) 61'
LK	20	Siobhan Soqeta	(substituted on) 61'
BR	21	Charlotte Escudero	(substituted on) 49'
SH	22	Alexandra Chambon	(substituted on) 61'
WG	23	Aubane Rousset	(substituted on) 7'	(substituted off) 13'	(substituted on) 46'
Coach:
(France) François Ratier

FB	15	Vittoria Ostuni Minuzzi
RW	14	Aura Muzzo		(substituted off) 8'	(substituted on) 17'	(substituted off) 61'
OC	13	Alyssa D'Incà
IC	12	Sara Mannini
LW	11	Francesca Granzotto
FH	10	Veronica Madia		(substituted off) 57'
SH	9	Alia Bitonci		(substituted off) 60'
N8	8	Elisa Giordano (c)
OF	7	Alissa Ranuccini		(substituted off) 61'
BF	6	Francesca Sgorbini
RL	5	Giordana Duca
LL	4	Valeria Fedrighi		(substituted off) 55'
TP	3	Alessia Pilani	(yellow card) 7'	(substituted off) 64'
HK	2	Vittoria Vecchini		(substituted off) 64'
LP	1	Silvia Turani				(substituted off) 30'
Replacements:
HK	16	Chiara Cheli		(substituted on) 64'
PR	17	Gaia Maris		(substituted on) 8'	(substituted off) 17'	(substituted on) 30'
PR	18	Vittoria Zanette		(substituted on) 64'
LK	19	Elettra Costantini		(substituted on) 55'
BR	20	Beatrice Veronese		(substituted on) 61'
SH	21	Sofia Stefan		(substituted on) 60'
FH	22	Emma Stevanin		(substituted on) 57'
CE	23	Gaia Buso				(substituted on) 61'
Coach:
(Italy) Fabio Roselli

Player of the Match:
Assia Khalfaoui (France)

Assistant referees:
Zoe Naude (South Africa)
Emily Hope (England)
Television match official:
Quinton Immelman (South Africa)
Foul play review officer:
Finlay Brown (Scotland)

Notes:

- Pauline Barrat, Anaïs Grando, Mathilde Lazarko, Cloe Correa, Siobhan Soqeta and Aubane Rousset (all France) and Chiara Cheli and Elettra Costantini (both Italy) made their international debuts.

11 April 2026
14:25 BST

(1 BP) England	33–12	Ireland
Try: Cokayne 7' c Bern (2) 18' c, 30' c Breach 54' c Kildunne 66' m Con: Rowland (4/5) 8', 19', 30', 54'	Report	Try: McGann 64' m King 73' c Con: O'Brien (1/2) 74'

Twickenham Stadium, London
Attendance: 77,120
Referee: Clara Munarini (Italy)

FB	15	Ellie Kildunne
RW	14	Jess Breach
OC	13	Megan Jones (c)
IC	12	Helena Rowland
LW	11	Claudia Moloney-MacDonald
FH	10	Holly Aitchison	(substituted off) 50'
SH	9	Lucy Packer	(substituted off) 50'
N8	8	Alex Matthews
OF	7	Sadia Kabeya
BF	6	Maddie Feaunati	(substituted off) 8'	(substituted on) 21'	(substituted off) 68'
RL	5	Lilli Ives Campion
LL	4	Morwenna Talling	(substituted off) 43'
TP	3	Sarah Bern	(substituted off) 50'
HK	2	Amy Cokayne	(substituted off) 68'
LP	1	Kelsey Clifford	(substituted off) 50'
Replacements:
HK	16	Connie Powell	(substituted on) 68'
PR	17	Mackenzie Carson	(substituted on) 50'
PR	18	Maud Muir	(substituted on) 50'
LK	19	Haineala Lutui	(substituted on) 43'
BR	20	Abi Burton	(substituted on) 8'	(substituted off) 21'	(substituted on) 68'
SH	21	Natasha Hunt	(substituted on) 50'	(substituted off) 63'
FH	22	Zoe Harrison	(substituted on) 50'
FB	23	Emma Sing		(substituted on) 63'
Coach:
(New Zealand) John Mitchell

FB	15	Stacey Flood
RW	14	Béibhinn Parsons	(substituted off) 59'
OC	13	Aoife Dalton
IC	12	Eve Higgins	(substituted off) 49'
LW	11	Vicky Elmes Kinlan
FH	10	Dannah O'Brien
SH	9	Emily Lane	(substituted off) 68'
N8	8	Aoife Wafer	(substituted off) 61'
OF	7	Erin King (c)
BF	6	Brittany Hogan
RL	5	Fiona Tuite
LL	4	Dorothy Wall	(substituted off) 49'
TP	3	Linda Djougang	(substituted off) 68'
HK	2	Cliodhna Moloney-MacDonald	(substituted off) 59'
LP	1	Ellena Perry	(substituted off) 49'
Replacements:
HK	16	Neve Jones	(substituted on) 59'
PR	17	Niamh O'Dowd	(substituted on) 49'
PR	18	Eilís Cahill	(substituted on) 68'
LK	19	Ruth Campbell	(substituted on) 49'
BR	20	Grace Moore	(substituted on) 61'
SH	21	Katie Whelan	(substituted on) 68'
CE	22	Nancy McGillivray	(substituted on) 49'
WG	23	Anna McGann	(substituted on) 51'
Coach:
(England) Scott Bemand

Player of the Match:
Megan Jones (England)

Assistant referees:
Amber Stamp-Dunstan (Wales)
Berenice Loubet (France)
Television match official:
Estelle Whaiapu (New Zealand)
Foul play review officer:
Aled Griffiths (Wales)

Notes:

- The attendance of 77,120 was a record for a Women's Six Nations fixture.
- Haineala Lutui (England), Eilís Cahill and Katie Whelan (both Ireland) made their international debuts.
- Cliodhna Moloney-MacDonald earned her 50th cap for Ireland.

11 April 2026
16:40 BST

(1 BP) Wales	19–24	Scotland
Try: Jones 11' m Tuipulotu 19' c Williams 72' c Con: Bevan (1/2) 12'; George (1/1) 73'	Report	Try: Rollie 8' c Campbell 51' c Scott 67' c Con: Nelson (3/3) 9', 52', 67'; Pen: Nelson (1/2) 34'

Principality Stadium, Cardiff
Attendance: 10,569
Referee: Ella Goldsmith (Australia)

FB	15	Kayleigh Powell
RW	14	Seren Singleton
OC	13	Carys Cox
IC	12	Courtney Keight
LW	11	Lisa Neumann		(substituted off) 68'
FH	10	Lleucu George
SH	9	Keira Bevan		(substituted off) 63'
N8	8	Bryonie King	(yellow card) 59'	(substituted off) 71'
OF	7	Kate Williams (c)
BF	6	Bethan Lewis
RL	5	Gwen Crabb		(substituted off) 71'
LL	4	Jorja Aiono		(substituted off) 52'
TP	3	Sisilia Tuipulotu		(substituted off) 59'
HK	2	Kelsey Jones		(substituted off) 59'
LP	1	Gwenllian Pyrs		(substituted off) 52'
Replacements:
HK	16	Molly Reardon		(substituted on) 59'
PR	17	Maisie Davies		(substituted on) 52'
PR	18	Donna Rose		(substituted on) 59'
LK	19	Alaw Pyrs		(substituted on) 52'
BR	20	Georgia Evans		(substituted on) 71'
BR	21	Branwen Metcalfe		(substituted on) 71'
SH	22	Seren Lockwood		(substituted on) 63'
CE	23	Hannah Dallavalle		(substituted on) 68'
Coach:
(Wales) Sean Lynn

FB	15	Chloe Rollie
RW	14	Rhona Lloyd
OC	13	Emma Orr		(substituted off) 53'
IC	12	Meryl Smith
LW	11	Shona Campbell		(substituted off) 63'
FH	10	Helen Nelson
SH	9	Leia Brebner-Holden
N8	8	Emily Coubrough
OF	7	Alex Stewart		(substituted off) 71'
BF	6	Rachel Malcolm (c)
RL	5	Emma Wassell
LL	4	Hollie Cunningham		(substituted off) 56'
TP	3	Elliann Clarke		(substituted off) 71'
HK	2	Lana Skeldon		(substituted off) 71'
LP	1	Leah Bartlett	(yellow card) 13'	(substituted off) 63'
Replacements:
HK	16	Elis Martin		(substituted on) 71'
PR	17	Demi Swann	(yellow card) 80+5'	(substituted on) 63'
PR	18	Molly Poolman		(substituted on) 71'
LK	19	Holland Bogan		(substituted on) 56'
LK	20	Eva Donaldson		(substituted on) 71'
SH	21	Rianna Darroch
CE	22	Evie Wills		(substituted on) 53'
FB	23	Lucia Scott		(substituted on) 63'
Coach:
(Australia) Sione Fukofuka

Player of the Match:
Helen Nelson (Scotland)

Assistant referees:
Precious Pazani (Zimbabwe)
Alexandra Ferre (France)
Television match official:
Graham Cooper (Australia)
Foul play review officer:
Paulo Duarte (Portugal)

Notes:

- Jorja Aiono and Seren Singleton (both Wales), and Emily Coubrough, Demi Swann, and Holland Bogan (all Scotland) made their international debuts.
- Leah Bartlett earned her 50th cap for Scotland.

=== Round 2 ===
18 April 2026
13:30 BST

Scotland	7–84	England (1 BP)
Try: Lloyd 36' c Con: Nelson (1/1) 37'	Report	Try: Kildunne (2) 8', 24'; Jones 13' c Kelsey Clifford 32' c Sing 39' c Cokayne 48' c Bern (2) 54' c, 60' c Packer 65' c Kabeya 75' c Venner 77' c Lutui 79' c Con: Harrison (12/12) 8', 14', 24', 33', 40', 49', 55', 60', 66', 75', 80'

Murrayfield Stadium, Edinburgh
Attendance: 30,498
Referee: Zoe Naude (South Africa)

FB	15	Chloe Rollie
RW	14	Rhona Lloyd			(substituted off) 61'
OC	13	Evie Wills	(substituted off) 42'
IC	12	Meryl Smith
LW	11	Shona Campbell	(substituted off) 47'
FH	10	Helen Nelson
SH	9	Leia Brebner-Holden	(substituted off) 13'	(substituted on) 25'
N8	8	Emily Coubrough	(substituted off) 60'
OF	7	Alex Stewart	(substituted off) 47'
BF	6	Rachel Malcolm (c)
LL	4	Hollie Cunningham	(substituted off) 47'
RL	5	Emma Wassell
TP	3	Elliann Clarke	(substituted off) 57'
HK	2	Lana Skeldon
LP	1	Leah Bartlett	(substituted off) 57'
Replacements:
HK	16	Elis Martin	(substituted on) 60'
PR	17	Demi Swann	(substituted on) 57'
PR	18	Molly Poolman	(substituted on) 57'
LK	19	Holland Bogan	(substituted on) 47'
FL	20	Rachel McLachlan	(substituted on) 47'
SH	21	Rianna Darroch	(substituted on) 13'	(substituted off) 25'	(substituted on) 61'
WG	22	Lucia Scott	(substituted on) 42'
WG	23	Francesca McGhie	(substituted on) 47'
Coach:
(Australia) Sione Fukofuka

FB	15	Emma Sing
RW	14	Jess Breach
OC	13	Megan Jones (c)
IC	12	Helena Rowland	(substituted off) 61'
LW	11	Ellie Kildunne	(substituted off) 61'
FH	10	Zoe Harrison
SH	9	Lucy Packer	(substituted off) 63'
N8	8	Maddie Feaunati
OF	7	Sadia Kabeya
BF	6	Demelza Short	(substituted off) 57'
RL	5	Lilli Ives Campion	(substituted off) 57'
LL	4	Abi Burton
TP	3	Maud Muir	(substituted off) 51'
HK	2	Amy Cokayne	(substituted off) 51'
LP	1	Kelsey Clifford	(substituted off) 51'
Replacements:
HK	16	Connie Powell	(substituted on) 51'
PR	17	Mackenzie Carson	(substituted on) 51'
PR	18	Sarah Bern	(substituted on) 51'
SR	19	Haineala Lutui	(substituted on) 63'
BR	20	Marlie Packer	(substituted on) 63'
SH	21	Flo Robinson	(substituted on) 63'
FH	22	Holly Aitchison	(substituted on) 61'
WG	23	Mia Venner	(substituted on) 61'
Coach:
(New Zealand) John Mitchell

Player of the Match:
Maddie Feaunati (England)

Assistant referees:
Clara Munarini (Italy)
Berenice Loubet (France)
Television match official:
Quinton Immelman (South Africa)
Foul play review officer:
Stefano Penne (Italy)

Notes:

- Demelza Short (England) and Rianna Darroch (Scotland) made their international debuts.
- Maud Muir earned her 50th cap for England.
- The attendance of 30,498 was a record for a Scotland women's home rugby union match.
- This also set a Scottish national domestic record for attendance at a women's sporting event, breaking the previous record of 18,555 set by Scotland Women's football team against Jamaica in 2019.

18 April 2026
15:35 BST

Wales	7–38	France (1 BP)
Try: Penalty try 15'	Report	Try: Fall 22' c Feleu 46' c Murié 54' m Bourdon Sansus 49' c Grando (2) 70' c, 78' m Con: Arbez (3/4) 23', 47', 59'; Queyroi (1/2) 71'

Cardiff Arms Park, Cardiff
Attendance: 4,163
Referee: Robbie Jenkinson (Ireland)

FB	15	Kayleigh Powell
RW	14	Seren Singleton		(substituted off) 56'
OC	13	Hannah Dallavalle		(substituted off) 58'
IC	12	Courtney Keight
LW	11	Jasmine Joyce-Butchers
FH	10	Lleucu George
SH	9	Seren Lockwood
N8	8	Bryonie King
OF	7	Kate Williams (c)		(substituted off) 48'
BF	6	Bethan Lewis
RL	5	Gwen Crabb	(yellow card) 52'	(substituted off) 67'
LL	4	Jorja Aiono		(substituted off) 46'
TP	3	Sisilia Tuipulotu		(substituted off) 50'
HK	2	Kelsey Jones		(substituted off) 50'
LP	1	Gwenllian Pyrs		(substituted off) 55'
Replacements:
HK	16	Molly Reardon		(substituted on) 50'
PR	17	Maisie Davies		(substituted on) 55'
PR	18	Donna Rose		(substituted on) 50'
LK	19	Natalia John		(substituted on) 46'
SR	20	Branwen Metcalfe		(substituted on) 72'
SR	21	Georgia Evans		(substituted on) 48'
SH	22	Keira Bevan		(substituted on) 56'
CE	23	Jenna De Vera		(substituted on) 58'
Coach:
(Wales) Sean Lynn

FB	15	Pauline Barrat
RW	14	Anaïs Grando
OC	13	Aubane Rousset
IC	12	Gabrielle Vernier		(substituted off) 48'
LW	11	Léa Murié		(substituted off) 17'	(substituted on) 25'
FH	10	Carla Arbez		(substituted off) 62'
SH	9	Pauline Bourdon Sansus	(yellow card) 14'	(substituted off) 68'
N8	8	Léa Champon
OF	7	Manae Feleu (c)
BF	6	Axelle Berthoumieu			(substituted off) 57'
RL	5	Madoussou Fall-Raclot		(substituted off) 48'	(substituted on) 57'
LL	4	Kiara Zago		(substituted off) 40'
TP	3	Assia Khalfaoui		(substituted off) 61'
HK	2	Mathilde Lazarko		(substituted off) 61'
LP	1	Yllana Brosseau	(yellow card) 13'			(substituted off) 35'
Replacements:
HK	16	Élisa Riffonneau		(substituted on) 61'
PR	17	Ambre Mwayembe		(substituted on) 17'	(substituted off) 25'	(substituted on) 35'
PR	18	Annaëlle Deshaye		(substituted on) 61'
LK	19	Siobhan Soqeta		(substituted on) 40'
BR	20	Charlotte Escudero		(substituted on) 68'
SH	21	Alexandra Chambon		(substituted on) 58'
FH	22	Lina Queyroi		(substituted on) 62'
CE	23	Teani Feleu		(substituted on) 48'
Coach:
(France) François Ratier

Player of the Match:
Pauline Bourdon Sansus (France)

Assistant referees:
Precious Pazani (Zimbabwe)
Emily Hope (England)
Television match official:
Estelle Whaiapu (New Zealand)
Foul play review officer:
Dan Jones (England)

Notes:

- Carys Cox (Wales) was originally named in the team but withdrew through injury. She was replaced in the starting XV at 13 by Hannah Dallavalle, who was subsequently replaced on the bench by Jenna De Vera.
- Jenna De Vera (Wales) made her international debut.

18 April 2026
17:40 BST

(1 BP) Ireland	57–20	Italy
Try: Lane 6' c Wafer 14' c Parsons (3) 19' c, 30' m, 40' c O'Connor 23' m Perry 35' c Moloney-MacDonald 43' m Hogan 72' c Con: O'Brien (6/9) 6', '15, '20, '36, '40, '73	Report	Try: Vecchini 11' m Minuzzi 32' m Madia 50' m D'Inca 78' m

Dexcom Stadium, Galway
Attendance: 9,206
Referee: Ella Goldsmith (Australia)

FB	15	Stacey Flood
RW	14	Béibhinn Parsons
OC	13	Aoife Dalton	(substituted off) 52'
IC	12	Nancy McGillivray
LW	11	Robyn O'Connor	(substituted off) 55'
FH	10	Dannah O'Brien
SH	9	Emily Lane	(substituted off) 67'
N8	8	Aoife Wafer	(substituted off) 52'
OF	7	Erin King (c)
BF	6	Brittany Hogan
RL	5	Ruth Campbell
LL	4	Fiona Tuite	(substituted off) 52'
TP	3	Linda Djougang	(substituted off) 52'
HK	2	Cliodhna Moloney-MacDonald	(substituted off) 52'
LP	1	Ellena Perry	(substituted off) 52'
Replacements:
HK	16	Neve Jones	(substituted on) 52'
PR	17	Niamh O'Dowd	(substituted on) 52'
PR	18	Sadhbh McGrath	(substituted on) 52'
SR	19	Dorothy Wall	(substituted on) 52'
SR	20	Sam Monaghan	(substituted on) 52'
SH	21	Katie Whelan	(substituted on) 67'
CE	22	Eve Higgins	(substituted on) 52'
WG	23	Anna McGann	(substituted on) 55'
Coach:
(England) Scott Bemand

FB	15	Vittoria Ostuni Minuzzi
RW	14	Gaia Buso	(substituted off) 55'
OC	13	Alyssa D'Incà
IC	12	Sara Mannini
LW	11	Aura Muzzo
FH	10	Emma Stevanin	(substituted off) 43'
SH	9	Sofia Stefan	(substituted off) 55'
N8	8	Elisa Giordano (c)
OF	7	Alissa Ranuccini	(substituted off) 59'
BF	6	Francesca Sgorbini
RL	5	Elettra Costantini
LL	4	Valeria Fedrighi	(substituted off) 40'
TP	3	Alessia Pilani	(substituted off) 40'
HK	2	Vittoria Vecchini	(substituted off) 55'
LP	1	Gaia Maris	(substituted off) 40'
Replacements:
HK	16	Chiara Cheli	(substituted on) 55'
PR	17	Silvia Turani	(substituted on) 40'
PR	18	Vittoria Zanette	(substituted on) 40'
LK	19	Giordana Duca	(substituted on) 40'
FL	20	Beatrice Veronese	(substituted on) 59'
SH	21	Alia Bitonci	(substituted on) 55'
FH	22	Veronica Madia	(substituted on) 43'
CE	23	Michela Sillari	(substituted on) 55'
Coach:
(Italy) Fabio Roselli

Player of the Match:
Béibhinn Parsons (Ireland)

Assistant referees:
Ben Connor (Wales)
Rebecca Piddlesden (England)
Television match official:
Graham Cooper (Australia)
Foul play review officer:
Finlay Brown (Scotland)

Notes:

- Robyn O'Connor made her international debut for Ireland.
- The attendance of 9,206 was a record for an Ireland women's home rugby union match.

=== Round 3 ===
25 April 2026
14:15 BST

(1 BP) England	62-24	Wales (1 BP)
Try: Feaunati 8'; David 13'; Packer (2) 25', 69'; Jones (2) 28', 40'; Cokayne 45'; MacDonald 53'; Breach 63'; Muir 76'; Con: Rowland 6', 26' 47' (3/7); Harrison 64', 70', 77' (3/3)	Report	Try: Bevan 16'; Jones 33'; Lewis 73'; Lockwood 80'; Con: Bevan 17', 74' (2/4)

Ashton Gate, Bristol
Attendance: 26,247
Referee: Ella Goldsmith (Australia)

FB	15	Ellie Kildunne
RW	14	Millie David
OC	13	Megan Jones (c)
IC	12	Helena Rowland
LW	11	Claudia Moloney-MacDonald
FH	10	Holly Aitchison
SH	9	Lucy Packer
N8	8	Maddie Feaunati
OF	7	Marlie Packer
BF	6	Sadia Kabeya
RL	5	Delaney Burns
LL	4	Abi Burton
TP	3	Sarah Bern
HK	2	Amy Cokayne
LP	1	Mackenzie Carson
Replacements:
HK	16	Connie Powell
PR	17	Kelsey Clifford
PR	18	Maud Muir
LK	19	Haineala Lutui
FL	20	Demelza Short
SH	21	Flo Robinson
FH	22	Zoe Harrison
WG	23	Jess Breach
Coach:
(New Zealand) John Mitchell

FB	15	Kayleigh Powell
RW	14	Seren Singleton
OC	13	Hannah Dallavlle
IC	12	Courtney Keight
LW	11	Jasmine Joyce-Butchers
FH	10	Lleucu George
SH	9	Keira Bevan
N8	8	Bryonie King
OF	7	Bethan Lewis (c)
BF	6	Branwen Metcalfe
RL	5	Gwen Crabb
LL	4	Jorja Aiono
TP	3	Sisilia Tuipulotu
HK	2	Kelsey Jones
LP	1	Gwenllian Pyrs
Replacements:
HK	16	Molly Reardon
PR	17	Maise Davies
PR	18	Donna Rose
LK	19	Georgia Evans
FL	20	Alisha Joyce-Butchers
SH	21	Seren Lockwood
CE	22	Jenna De Vera
WG	23	Catherine Richards
Coach:
(Wales) Sean Lynn

Player of the Match:
Marlie Packer (England)

Assistant referees:
Jess Ling (Australia)
Beatrice Smussi (Italy)
Television match official:
Leo Colgan (Ireland)
Foul play review officer:
Paul Haycock (Ireland)

Notes:

- Millie David made her international debut for England.

25 April 2026
17:30 CET

(1 BP) Italy	41-14	Scotland
Try: D'Inca (2) 7', 34'; Zanette (2) 15', 29'; Muzzo 39'; Vecchini 44'm Duca 60'; Con: Sillari 35', 40', 61' (3/7)	Report	Try: Skeldon 52'; Poolman 74'; Con: Nelson 53', 75' (2/2)

Stadio Sergio Lanfranchi, Parma
Attendance: 4,787
Referee: Robbie Jenkinson (Ireland)

FB	15	Vittoria Ostuni Minuzzi
RW	14	Aura Muzzo
OC	13	Michela Sillari
IC	12	Sara Mannini
LW	11	Alyssa D'Inca
FH	10	Veronica Madia
SH	9	Sofia Stefan
N8	8	Elisa Giordano (c)
OF	7	Alissa Ranuccini
BF	6	Francesca Sgorbini
RL	5	Giordana Duca
LL	4	Valeria Fedrighi
TP	3	Vittoria Zanette
HK	2	Vittoria Vecchini
LP	1	Silvia Turani
Replacements:
HK	16	Chiara Cheli
PR	17	Gaia Maris
PR	18	Alessia Pilani
LK	19	Alessandra Frangipani
FL	20	Margherita Tonellotto
SH	21	Alia Bitonci
FH	22	Emma Stevanin
WG	23	Francesca Granzotto
Coach:
(Italy) Fabio Roselli

FB	15	Chloe Rollie
RW	14	Francesca McGhie
OC	13	Lucia Scott
IC	12	Meryl Smith
LW	11	Shona Campbell
FH	10	Helen Nelson
SH	9	Leia Brebner-Holden
N8	8	Rachel McLachlan
OF	7	Alex Stewart
BF	6	Eva Donaldson
RL	5	Hollie Cunningham
LL	4	Emma Wassell
TP	3	Elliann Clarke
HK	2	Lana Skeldon (c)
LP	1	Demi Swann
Replacements:
HK	16	Elis Martin
PR	17	Leah Bartlett
PR	18	Molly Poolman
LK	19	Holland Bogan
LK	20	Louise McMillan
LK	21	Becky Boyd
SH	22	Rianna Darroch
CE	23	Rachel Philipps
Coach:
(Australia) Sione Fukofuka

Player of the Match:
Francesca Sgorbini (Italy)

Assistant referees:
Zoe Naude (South Africa)
Emily Hope (England)
Television match official:
Dan Jones (England)
Foul play review officer:
Jenny Davies (Wales)

Notes:

- The attendance of 4,787 was a record for an Italian women's home rugby union match.

25 April 2026
21:10 CET

(1 BP) France	26-7	Ireland
Try: Mwayembe 16'c Arbez 51'c Grando 68'm Champon 79'c Con: Arbez 17', 51', 80' (3/4)	Report	Try: Moloney 11'; Con: O'Brien 12'

Stade Marcel-Michelin, Clermont-Ferrand
Attendance: 17,000
Referee: Clara Munarini (Italy)

FB	15	Pauline Barratt
RW	14	Anaïs Grando
OC	13	Aubane Rousset
IC	12	Teani Feleu
LW	11	Lea Murie
FH	10	Carla Arbez
SH	9	Pauline Bourdon Sansus
N8	8	Lea Champon
OF	7	Manae Feleu (c)
BF	6	Axelle Berthoumieu
RL	5	Madoussou Fall Raclot
LL	4	Kiara Zago
TP	3	Assia Khalfaoui
HK	2	Mathilde Lazarko
LP	1	Ambre Mwayembe
Replacements:
HK	16	Elisa Riffonneau
PR	17	Yllan Brosseau
PR	18	Rose Bernadou
LK	19	Cloe Correa
LK	20	Siobhan Soqeta
N8	21	Charlotte Escudero
SH	22	Alexandra Chambon
FH	23	Lina Queyroi
Coach:
(France) Francois Ratier

FB	15	Stacey Flood
RW	14	Beibhinn Parsons
OC	13	Aoife Dalton
IC	12	Nancy McGillivray
LW	11	Robyn O'Connor
FH	10	Dannah O'Brien
SH	9	Emily Lane
N8	8	Aoife Wafer
OF	7	Erin King (c)
BF	6	Brittany Hogan
RL	5	Fiona Tuite
LL	4	Dorothy Wall
TP	3	Linda Djougang
HK	2	Cliodhna Moloney-MacDonald
LP	1	Ellena Perry
Replacements:
HK	16	Neve Jones
PR	17	Niamh O'Dowd
PR	18	Eilis Cahill
LK	19	Ruth Campbell
LK	20	Sam Monoghan
SH	21	Katie Whelan
CE	22	Eve Higgins
WG	23	Anna McGann
Coach:
(England) Scott Bemand

Player of the Match:
Ambre Mwayembe (France)

Assistant referees:
Amber Stamp-Dunstan (Wales)
Rebecca Piddlesden (England)
Television match official:
Stefano Penne (Italy)
Foul play review officer:
Matteo Liperini (Italy)

=== Round 4 ===
9 May 2026
15:00 CET

(1 BP) Italy	33–61	England (1 BP)
Try: Vecchini 17' m Penalty Try 25' m Ranuccini 35' m Sgorbini (2) 56', 80'; Con: Sillari (3/4) 36', 57', 80'	Report	Try: Packer (4) 4', 32', 52', 59' m Cokayne (2) 9', 20' m Rowland 12' m Venner 14' m Burton 48'; Con: Harrison (8/9) 5', 9', 13', 21', 33', 49', 53', 60'

Stadio Sergio Lanfranchi, Parma
Attendance: 4,376
Referee: Jess Ling (Australia)

FB	15	Vittoria Ostuni Minuzzi
RW	14	Aura Muzzo
OC	13	Michela Sillari
IC	12	Sara Mannini
LW	11	Alyssa D'Inca
FH	10	Veronica Madia
SH	9	Sofia Stefan
N8	8	Elisa Giordano (c)
OF	7	Alissa Ranuccini
BF	6	Beatrice Veronese
RL	5	Alessandra Frangipani
LL	4	Valeria Fedrighi
TP	3	Vittoria Zanette
HK	2	Vittoria Vecchini
LP	1	Silvia Turani
Replacements:
HK	16	Chiara Cheli
PR	17	Gaia Maris
PR	18	Gaia Dosi
LK	19	Giordana Duca
FL	20	Francesca Sgorbini
SH	21	Alia Bitonci
FH	22	Emma Stevanin
WG	23	Francesca Granzotto
Coach:
(Italy) Fabio Roselli

FB	15	Emma Sing
RW	14	Mia Venner
OC	13	Megan Jones (c)
IC	12	Helena Rowland
LW	11	Ellie Kildunne
FH	10	Zoe Harrison
SH	9	Lucy Packer
N8	8	Abi Burton
OF	7	Marlie Packer
BF	6	Demelza Short
RL	5	Delaney Burns
LL	4	Haineala Lutui
TP	3	Maud Muir
HK	2	Amy Cokayne
LP	1	Kelsey Clifford
Replacements:
HK	16	Connie Powell
PR	17	Mackenzie Carson
PR	18	Sarah Bern
LK	19	Christiana Balogun
FL	20	Haidee Head
SH	21	Flo Robinson
FH	22	Holly Aitchison
WG	23	Claudia Moloney-MacDonald
Coach:
(New Zealand) John Mitchell

Player of the Match:
Marlie Packer (England)

Assistant referees:
Robbie Jenkinson (Ireland)
Berenice Loubet (France)
Television match official:
Leo Colgan (Ireland)
Foul play review officer:
Julien Castaignede (France)

Notes:

- Christiana Balogun and Haidee Head (both England) made their international debuts.

9 May 2026
16:15 BST

(1 BP) Scotland	28–69	France (1 BP)
Try: Philipps (2) 16', 35' m Coughbrough 68' m Sutcliffe 78'; Con: Nelson (4/4) 17', 36', 69', 79'	Report	Try: Feleu 1' m Arbez 19' m Soqeta (2) 28', 57' m Champon (2) 31', 39' m Barratt 42' m Chambon 61' m Murie 63' m Deshayes 71' m Mwayembe 80'; Con: Arbez (4/7) 20', 29', 32', 57' m Queyroi (3/4) 62', 72', 80'

Edinburgh Rugby Stadium, Edinburgh
Attendance: 5,871
Referee: Aimee Barrett-Theron (South Africa)

FB	15	Chloe Rollie
RW	14	Rhona Lloyd
OC	13	Rachel Philipps
IC	12	Meryl Smith
LW	11	Francesca McGhie
FH	10	Helen Nelson (c)
SH	9	Leia Brebner-Holden
N8	8	Becky Boyd
OF	7	Eva Donaldson
BF	6	Holland Bogan
RL	5	Louise McMillan
LL	4	Emma Wassell
TP	3	Elliann Clarke
HK	2	Elis Martin
LP	1	Leah Bartlett
Replacements:
HK	16	Aicha Sutcliffe
PR	17	Demi Swann
PR	18	Molly Poolman
LK	19	Hollie Cunningham
FL	20	Emily Coubrough
SH	21	Rhea Clarke
FB	22	Lucia Scott
WG	23	Shona Campbell
Coach:
(Australia) Sione Fukofuka

FB	15	Pauline Barratt
RW	14	Anais Grando
OC	13	Aubane Rousset
IC	12	Teani Feleu
LW	11	Lea Murie
FH	10	Carla Arbez
SH	9	Pauline Bourdon-Sansus
N8	8	Léa Champon
OF	7	Manae Feleu
BF	6	Charlotte Escudero
RL	5	Madoussou Fall Raclot
LL	4	Siobhan Soqeta
TP	3	Assia Khalfaoui
HK	2	Mathilde Lazarko
LP	1	Yllana Brosseau
Replacements:
HK	16	Élisa Riffonneau
PR	17	Ambre Mwayembe
PR	18	Annaëlle Deshayes
BR	19	Khoudedia Cissokho
LK	20	Kiara Zago
BR	21	Axelle Berthoumieu
SH	22	Alexandra Chambon
FH	23	Lina Queyroi
Coach:
(France) Francois Ratier

Player of the Match:
Carla Arbez (France)

Assistant referees:
Amber Stamp-Dunstan (Wales)
Maria Latos (Germany)
Television match official:
Aled Griffiths (Wales)
Foul play review officer:
Jenny Davies (Wales)

9 May 2026
18:30 BST

(1 BP) Ireland	33–12	Wales
Try: Wafer (2) 12', 55'm Parsons 30' m Hogan (2) 40', 80'; Con: O'Brien (4/5) 13', 40', 56', 80'	Report	Try: Evans 23' m Joyce-Butchers 78'; Con: Bevan (1/1) 24' m

Ravenhill Stadium, Belfast
Attendance: 4,979
Referee: Aurélie Groizeleau (France)

FB	15	Stacey Flood
RW	14	Beibhinn Parsons
OC	13	Aoife Dalton
IC	12	Eve Higgins
LW	11	Robyn O'Connor
FH	10	Dannah O'Brien
SH	9	Emily Lane
N8	8	Aoife Wafer
OF	7	Erin King (c)
BF	6	Brittany Hogan
RL	5	Fiona Tuite
LL	4	Dorothy Wall
TP	3	Linda Djougang
HK	2	Cliodnha Moloney-MacDonald
LP	1	Ellena Perry
Replacements:
HK	16	Neve Jones
PR	17	Sadhbh McGrath
PR	18	Ellis Cahill
LK	19	Ruth Campbell
LK	20	Sam Monaghan
BR	21	Grace Moore
SH	22	Katie Whelan
FB	23	Niamh Gallagher
Coach:
(England) Scott Bemand

FB	15	Kayleigh Powell
RW	14	Hannah Dallavalle
OC	13	Carys Cox
IC	12	Courtney Keight
LW	11	Jasmine Joyce-Butchers
FH	10	Lleucu George
SH	9	Keira Bevan
N8	8	Bryonie King
OF	7	Bethan Lewis (c)
BF	6	Jorja Aiono
RL	5	Georgia Evans
LL	4	Branwen Metcalfe
TP	3	Sisilia Tuipulotu
HK	2	Kelsey Jones
LP	1	Gwenlian Pyrs
Replacements:
HK	16	Molly Reardon
PR	17	Maisie Davies
PR	18	Donnna Rose
LK	19	Natalia John
FL	20	Alisha Joyce-Butchers
SH	21	Seren Lockwood
FH	22	Freya Bell
WG	23	Nikita Prothero
Coach:
(Wales) Sean Lynn

Player of the Match:
Aoife Wafer (Ireland)

Assistant referees:
Alexandra Ferre (France)
Beatrice Smussi (Italy)
Television match official:
Paulo Duarte (Portugal)
Foul play review officer:
Dan Jones (England)

=== Round 5 ===
17 May 2026
12:15 BST

Wales	24–43	Italy
Try: Keight 10'; Cox 24'; Jones 39'; Powell 80'; Con: Bevan (2/3) 25', 40'	Report	Try: Minuzzi (2) 4', 52'; Granzotto 13'; D'Inca (2) 27', 77'; Sgorbini 48'; Madia 69'; Con: Sillari (4/7) 14', 53', 70', 78'

Cardiff Arms Park, Cardiff
Attendance: 3,712
Referee: Maggie Cogger-Orr (New Zealand)

FB	15	Kayleigh Powell
RW	14	Seren Singleton
OC	13	Carys Cox
IC	12	Courtney Keight
LW	11	Jasmine Joyce-Butchers
FH	10	Lleucu George
SH	9	Keira Bevan
N8	8	Bryonie King
OF	7	Bethan Lewis (c)
BF	6	Jorja Aiono
RL	5	Georgia Evans
LL	4	Branwen Metcalfe
TP	3	Sisilia Tuipulotu
HK	2	Kelsey Jones
LP	1	Gwenllian Pyrs
Replacements:
HK	16	Molly Reardon
PR	17	Maisie Davies
PR	18	Donna Rose
LK	19	Natalia John
FL	20	Alisha Joyce-Butchers
SH	21	Seren Lockwood
C	22	Hannah Dallavalle
WG	23	Nikita Prothero
Coach:
(Wales) Sean Lynn

FB	15	Vittoria Ostuni Minuzzi
RW	14	Francesca Granzotto
OC	13	Michela Sillari
IC	12	Sara Mannini
LW	11	Alyssa D'Inca
FH	10	Veronica Madia
SH	9	Sofia Stefan
N8	8	Elisa Giordano (c)
OF	7	Alissa Ranuccini
BF	6	Francesca Sgorbini
RL	5	Giordana Duca
LL	4	Valeria Fedrighi
TP	3	Gaia Maris
HK	2	Vittoria Vecchini
LP	1	Silvia Turani
Replacements:
HK	16	Chiara Cheli
PR	17	Vittoria Zanette
PR	18	Gaia Dosi
LK	19	Alessandra Frangipani
FL	20	Beatrice Veronese
SH	21	Alia Bitonci
FH	22	Emma Stevanin
WG	23	Aura Muzzo
Coach:
(Italy) Fabio Roselli

Player of the Match:
Veronica Madia (Italy)

Assistant referees:
Emily Hope (England)
Rebecca Piddlesden (England)
Television match official:
Dan Jones (England)
Foul play review officer:
Paul Haycock (Ireland)

17 May 2026
14:30 BST

Ireland	54–5	Scotland
Try: Moloney 5'; O'Connor 8'; Hogan (2) 14', 60'; King 19'; Wafer (2) 30', 39'; Flood 36'; Con: O'Brien (7/8) 6', 9', 15', 31', 37', 40', 61'	Report	Try: Sutcliffe 80' m

Aviva Stadium, Dublin
Attendance: 31,294
Referee: Aurélie Groizeleau (France)

FB	15	Stacey Flood
RW	14	Beibhinn Parsons
OC	13	Aoife Dalton
IC	12	Eve Higgins
LW	11	Robyn O'Connor
FH	10	Dannah O'Brien
SH	9	Emily Lane
N8	8	Aoife Wafer
OF	7	Erin King (c)
BF	6	Brittany Hogan
RL	5	Fiona Tuite
LL	4	Sam Monaghan
TP	3	Linda Djougang
HK	2	Cliodnha Moloney-MacDonald
LP	1	Ellena Perry
Replacements:
HK	16	Neve Jones
PR	17	Sadhbh McGrath
PR	18	Ellis Cahill
LK	19	Dorothy Wall
LK	20	Ruth Campbell
SH	21	Katie Whelan
WG	22	Vicky Elmes Kinlan
FB	23	Niamh Gallagher
Coach:
(England) Scott Bemand

FB	15	Chloe Rollie
RW	14	Rhona Lloyd
OC	13	Rachel Philipps
IC	12	Meryl Smith
LW	11	Shona Campbell
FH	10	Helen Nelson (c)
SH	9	Leia Brebner-Holden
N8	8	Emily Coubrough
OF	7	Eva Donaldson
BF	6	Becky Boyd
RL	5	Louise McMillan
LL	4	Emma Wassell
TP	3	Elliann Clarke
HK	2	Elis Martin
LP	1	Leah Bartlett
Replacements:
HK	16	Aicha Sutcliffe
PR	17	Demi Swann
PR	18	Molly Poolman
LK	19	Hollie Cunningham
FL	20	Holland Bogan
SH	21	Rhea Clarke
FB	22	Lucia Scott
WG	23	Coreen Grant
Coach:
(Australia) Sione Fukofuka

Player of the Match:
Aoife Wafer (Ireland)

Assistant referees:
Berenice Loubet (France)
Alexandra Ferre (France)
Television match official:
Julien Castaignede (France)
Foul play review officer:
Paulo Duarte (Portugal)

Notes:

- This set an Irish domestic record for a Women's Six Nations fixture with over 30,000 in attendance, breaking the previous record established against Italy earlier in the tournament.

17 May 2026
17:45 CET

France	28–43	England
Try: Bourdon (2) 13', 58'; Grando 53'; Bernadou 80'; Con: Arbez (3/3) 14', 54', 59'; Queyroi 80'	Report	Try: Bern 22'; Kildunne (2) 28', 40'; Breach (2) 36', 65'; Cokayne 78'; Con: Harrison (5/6) 23', 29', 37', 66', 79'; Pen: Harrison 42'

Stade Atlantique, Bordeaux
Attendance: 35,062
Referee: Clara Munarini (Italy)

FB	15	Pauline Barratt
RW	14	Anaïs Grando
OC	13	Aubane Rousset
IC	12	Teani Feleu
LW	11	Lea Murie
FH	10	Carla Arbez
SH	9	Pauline Bourdon Sansus
N8	8	Lea Champon
OF	7	Manae Feleu (c)
BF	6	Axelle Berthoumieu
RL	5	Madoussou Fall Raclot
LL	4	Siobhan Soqeta
TP	3	Assia Khalfaoui
HK	2	Mathilde Lazarko
LP	1	Ambre Mwayembe
Replacements:
HK	16	Elisa Riffonneau
PR	17	Yllan Brosseau
PR	18	Rose Bernadou
LK	19	Kiara Zago
LK	20	Cloe Correa
N8	21	Charlotte Escudero
SH	22	Alexandra Chambon
FH	23	Lina Queyroi
Coach:
(France) Francois Ratier

FB	15	Ellie Kildunne
RW	14	Jess Breach
OC	13	Megan Jones (c)
IC	12	Helena Rowland
LW	11	Claudia Moloney-MacDonald
FH	10	Zoe Harrison
SH	9	Lucy Packer
N8	8	Maddie Feaunati
OF	7	Sadia Kabeya
BF	6	Abi Burton
RL	5	Delaney Burns
LL	4	Lilli Ives Campion
TP	3	Sarah Bern
HK	2	Amy Cokayne
LP	1	Mackenzie Carson
Replacements:
HK	16	Connie Powell
PR	17	Liz Crake
PR	18	Maud Muir
LK	19	Demelza Short
FL	20	Marlie Packer
SH	21	Flo Robinson
FH	22	Holly Aitchison
WG	23	Emma Sing
Coach:
(New Zealand) John Mitchell

Player of the Match:
Ellie Kildunne (England)

Assistant referees:
Aimee Barrett-Theron (South Africa)
Amber Stamp-Dunstan (Wales)
Television match official:
Matteo Liperini (Italy)
Foul play review officer:
Leo Colgan (Ireland)

Notes:

- This set a French domestic record for a Six Nations fixture with over 35,000 in attendance, breaking the previous record against England from the 2024 championship.

== Player statistics ==
=== Most points ===
As of 18 May 2026

Rank	Name	Team	Points
1	Zoe Harrison	England	59
2	Carla Arbez	France	51
3	Dannah O'Brien	Ireland	38
4	Marlie Packer	England	35
5	Amy Cokayne	England	30
6	Alyssa D'Inca	Italy	27
7	Sarah Bern	England	25
7	Anaïs Grando	France	25
7	Aoife Wafer	Ireland	25
7	Brittany Hogan	Ireland	25
7	Ellie Kildunne	England	25

=== Most tries ===
As of 18 May 2026

Rank	Name	Team	Tries
1	Marlie Packer	England	7
2	Amy Cokayne	England	6
3	Sarah Bern	England	5
3	Anaïs Grando	France	5
3	Aoife Wafer	Ireland	5
3	Brittany Hogan	Ireland	5
3	Ellie Kildunne	England	5
3	Alyssa D'Inca	Italy	5

== See also ==
- Women's Six Nations Championship
- Women's international rugby union
- 2026 Six Nations Championship
- 2026 Six Nations Women's U21 Series
