= Blagnac SCR Women =

Blagnac SCR
- Ground: Stade Ernest-Argelès
- President: Richard Caravaca; Jean-Louis Gorry
- Coach: Éric Escribano
- Most caps: Nathalie Amiel
- League: Élite 1
- 2024–25: 2nd
Team kit

Official website
- www.blagnac-rugby.fr

Blagnac Sporting Club Rugby Women are a French women's rugby union club, based in Blagnac, Haute-Garonne. They compete in France's top division for women's rugby, the Élite 1 competition.

They were founded in Saint-Orens-de-Gameville, southeast of Toulouse, as Saint-Orens Rugby Féminin (SORF) and were twice French first division champions. In 2013, they merged with Blagnac Sporting Club Rugby for infrastructural and financial reasons, and were called Blagnac Saint-Orens Rugby Féminin. In 2017, they later dropped the Saint-Orens reference from their name and were simply Blagnac Rugby Féminin until 2024.

== History ==
In 2009, the club returned to the French top division after winning the second division title against Bobigny. In the 2009–2010 season, SORF played in the Top 10, securing their place in the league on the final day with a home victory against Caen.

The 2012–2013 season was a great sporting success for the club. For the third consecutive year the U18 team were crowned French Sevens Champions, as well as Grand Sud Sevens and Twelve Champions. The senior reserve team also won the Grand Sud and Fédérale 3 French Championships. The first team finished 7th in the Top 10, their best ranking since promotion in 2009. During this season, Manon André and Marjorie Mayans played in the Six Nations tournament. Nine players became European University Champions for the first time with Paul Sabatier University.

In 2013, Saint-Orens women's rugby became Blagnac Saint-Orens women's rugby. Saint-Orens women's rugby and Blagnac Sporting Club rugby joined forces for financial reasons and to provide their elite players with proper facilities. The first team finished 5th in the championship, after being defeated by Montpellier in the quarter-finals. The reserve team, playing in Fédérale 2, finished in a respectable position, earning them another consecutive promotion to Fédérale 1. The youth teams (development and elite) won the Grand Sud titles as well as a fourth consecutive national title. Nine players from the club were once again European University Champions with Paul Sabatier University.

In 2014–2015, its second year under the name BSORF (Blagnac Saint-Orens Women's Rugby), the club's Top 8 team finished 3rd in the regular season. They were defeated in the semi-finals by the reigning French champions, Montpellier, by a score of 17–24. Their reserve team also lost in the semi-finals of the newly formed French Elite Reserve Championship.

In 2016, the club lost again in the semi-finals of the Top 8 against Lille Métropole RC villeneuvois in a two-legged tie (27–15 in Blagnac then 34–10 in Villeneuve-d'Ascq).

In 2017, they were once again eliminated in the semi-finals by Montpellier (13–19 for Montpellier in Blagnac then 13–17 for BSORF in Montpellier). The reserve team are French elite reserve champions.

The club was renamed Blagnac Rugby Féminin during the off-season; the name change was effective with the FRF on 8 July 2018; the name remained active until the 2023–2024 season, the year in which the Blagnac Rugby men's professional side declared bankruptcy, however, the BSCR women and junior teams remained active.

In 2021, 2022, and 2023, the first team lost in the Elite 1 final, three defeats in three consecutive finals. The reserve team won the French Elite Reserve Championship in 2023.

The club was the most represented in the French team with nine players selected for the 2021 Rugby World Cup in New Zealand, accompanied by players playing in other clubs but trained in Saint-Orens or Blagnac Saint-Orens such as Laure Touyé, Laure Sansus and Gaëlle Hermet.

== Current squad ==
2025–26 Élite 1 season squad:

Note: Flags indicate national union under World Rugby eligibility rules. Players may hold more than one non-World Rugby nationality.

| Player | Position | Union |
|---|---|---|
| **Manon Bigot** | Hooker | France |
| **Célia Domain** | Hooker | France |
| Kenza Necer | Hooker | France |
| Emi Pereira Da Silva | Hooker | France |
| Sylvie Bayle | Prop | France |
| Laura Belebbad | Prop | France |
| Léa Delrieu | Prop | France |
| Anaïs Dubreuil | Prop | France |
| Marie Grasset | Prop | France |
| **Clara Joyeux** | Prop | France |
| **Coco Lindelauf** | Prop | France |
| Méline Perraudin | Prop | France |
| **Audrey Forlani** | Lock | France |
| **Irene Garrido Peinado** | Lock | Spain |
| Abygaëlle Dal Lago | Lock | France |
| Julia Grosz | Lock | France |
| Camille Mignotte | Lock | France |
| Lucie Perrot | Lock | France |
| Cyrielle Augé | Back row | France |
| Clémence Cinot | Back row | France |
| Anais Descombes Illiaquer | Back row | France |
| Heivai Jamet | Back row | France |
| Clémentine Pages | Back row | France |
| Eva Roussaly | Back row | France |
| Charlotte Rufas | Back row | France |
| Léa Polak | Forward | France |

| Player | Position | Union |
|---|---|---|
| Emma Lechardoy | Scrum-half | France |
| Léa Lenoir | Scrum-half | France |
| Elodie Martin | Scrum-half | France |
| **Audrey Abadie** | Fly-half | France |
| Elsa Bonnet | Fly-half | France |
| **Veronica Madia** | Fly-half | Italy |
| Justine Bouscatel | Centre | France |
| **Alyssa D'Incà** | Centre | Italy |
| **Carla Neisen** | Centre | France |
| **Gabrielle Vernier** | Centre | France |
| **Anael Fernández Terenzi** | Wing | Spain |
| Flavie Laine | Wing | France |
| **Mélissande Llorens** | Wing | France |
| Cherrazade Saiki | Wing | France |
| Justine Toro | Wing | France |
| **Émilie Boulard** | Fullback | France |

- Senior 15s internationally capped players are listed in **bold**.

== Honours ==
- French Championship:
  - Winner (2): 1990, 1993;
  - Finalist (6): 1991, 1992, 1994, 1997, 2002, 2021, 2022 and 2023
- French Women's Rugby Union Championship, 2nd Division:
  - Winner (2): 1989, 2009.
- French Women's Rugby Union Championship, 3rd Federal Division:
  - Winner (2): 2006 (team B), 2013 (team B).
- French Women's Elite Reserve Championship
  - Winner (2): 2017 and 2023
- French Cup :
  - Winner: 2023
  - Finalist: 1990

List of Finals played by Blagnac SCR
| Season | Champion | Score | Runner-up | Venue |
|---|---|---|---|---|
| 1990 | Saint-Orens Rugby féminin | 7–6 | Violettes bressanes | Tours |
| 1991 | RC Chilly-Mazarin | 3–0 | Saint-Orens rugby féminin | Saint-Yrieix-la-Perche |
| 1992 | Pachys d'Herm | 10–3 | Saint-Orens rugby féminin | Marciac |
| 1993 | Saint-Orens rugby féminin | 13–3 | Violettes bressanes | L'Isle-sur-la-Sorgue |
| 1994 | AS Romagnat | 21–12 | Saint-Orens rugby féminin | Maurs |
| 1997 | Pachys d'Herm | 30–17 | Saint-Orens rugby féminin | Stade Jean-Bouin, Paris |
| 2002 | Caen Rugby Club | 10–3 | Saint-Orens rugby féminin | Tyrosse |
| 2021 | ASM Romagnat | 13–8 | Blagnac RF | Stade Ernest-Argelès, Blagnac |
| 2022 | Stade toulousain | 16–10 | Blagnac RF | Stade Lesdiguières, Grenoble |
| 2023 | Stade Bordelais | 27–23 | Blagnac RF | Stade Pierre-Rajon, Bourgoin-Jallieu |

== Notable players ==
- Koumiba Djossouvi
- Nathalie Amiel (1992–2002)
- Marjorie Mayans (since 2006)
- Manon André (since 2005)
- Audrey Forlani (since 2007)
- Carla Neisen (since 2014)
- Audrey Abadie (since 2014)
- Manon Bigot (since 2013)

== Coaches ==
| Season | Coach | Assistant coaches |
|---|---|---|
| 2003–06 | Nathalie Amiel | Gilles Bras, Gilles Bastouille |
| 2006–08 | — | — |
| 2008–09 | Thierry Sanson | — |
| 2009–10 | Daniel Sibra | Nicolas Balmes |
| 2010–11 | Daniel Sibra | Benoit Sibra, Bertrand Cabrol, Marc Manso |
| 2011–12 | Alain Favarel | Jérôme Tronco, Bertrand Cabrol, Marc Manso |
| 2012–13 | Eric Carrière | Mika Mafutuna, Bertrand Cabrol, Marc Manso |
| 2013–14 | Eric Carrière | Alain Diez, Cyril Balestère, Bertrand Cabrol |
| 2014–15 | Eric Carrière | Alain Diez, Bertrand Cabrol, Bertrand Lartet |
| 2015–16 | Eric Carrière | Nicolas Tranier, Mélanie Busque, Bertrand Cabrol, Bertrand Lartet |
| 2016–17 | Eric Carrière | Nicolas Tranier, Gatien Roullier, Grégoire Verdenal |
| 2017–18 | Nicolas Tranier | Jean Lasserre, Grégoire Verdenal |
| 2018–21 | Nicolas Tranier | Jean Lasserre, Laurent Tranier |
| 2021–25 | Nicolas Tranier | Laurent Tranier |
| 2025– | Eric Escribano | — |
