= Seren Lockwood =

Welsh rugby union player

- Born: 28 October 2006 (age 20) Wales
- Height: 157 cm (5 ft 2 in)
- School: Whitchurch High School
- University: Hartpury University

Rugby union career
- Position: Scrum-half
Amateur team(s)
Years	Team	Apps	(Points)
–	Cardiff Quins		
Senior career
Years	Team	Apps	(Points)
2024–2025	Gwalia Lightning		
2025–	Gloucester-Hartpury		
2025–	Brython Thunder		
International career
Years	Team	Apps	(Points)
2025–	Wales		

Seren Lockwood (born 28 October 2006) is a Welsh rugby union player who plays as a scrum-half for Gloucester-Hartpury in Premiership Women's Rugby, Brython Thunder in the Celtic Challenge, and the Wales women's national rugby union team.

== Early life ==
Lockwood grew up in Wales and attended Whitchurch High School in Cardiff. She developed through the youth rugby system at Cardiff Quins before joining Hartpury College in 2023 to further her rugby and academic career. In 2023, she represented Wales at the Commonwealth Youth Games sevens tournament in Trinidad and Tobago.

== Club career ==
After joining Hartpury College in 2023, Lockwood competed in BUCS Super Rugby and played for Gwalia Lightning in the Celtic Challenge during the 2024–25 season. In June 2025, she signed a senior contract with Gloucester-Hartpury ahead of the 2025–26 season, having progressed through the club's Hartpury University pathway. She also joined Brython Thunder in the Celtic Challenge for the 2025–26 season.

== International career ==
Lockwood represented Wales at age-grade level, including at the under-18 Women's Six Nations Festival in 2024 and 2025. In June 2025, she was named in the extended 45-player Wales training squad preparing for the 2025 Women's Rugby World Cup.

She earned her first senior cap as a replacement against Australia on 26 July 2025 in Brisbane, one of three players to make their Wales debut on that tour alongside prop Katherine Baverstock and lock Tilly Vucaj. She was subsequently named in the Wales squad for the 2025 Women's Rugby World Cup.

Lockwood was included in the Wales squad for the 2026 Women's Six Nations Championship. She earned her first senior start against France at Cardiff Arms Park on 19 April 2026.
