= Molly Poolman =

Scottish rugby player (born 2004)

- Born: 10 May 2004 (age 22) Perth, Scotland
- Height: 162 cm (5 ft 4 in)
- University: Heriot-Watt University

Rugby union career
- Position: Tight-head prop
Youth career
- -: Howe of Fife RFC
Senior career
| Years | Team | Apps | (Points) |
| 2022- | Watsonian FC | | |
| 2023- | Edinburgh Rugby | | |
International career
| Years | Team | Apps | (Points) |
| 2025- | Scotland | 12 | (5) |

Molly Poolman (born 10 May 2004) is a Scottish rugby union international player. She has played tight-head prop with Watsonian FC and with the Edinburgh Rugby squad she took part in the Celtic Challenge. She debuted for Scotland in 2025 in the Women's Six Nations tournament. She was part of the 2025 Rugby Women's World Cup Scotland squad.

== Early life ==
Molly Poolman was born on 10 May 2004 in Perth, Scotland. She started playing rugby at eleven years of age with Howe of Fife RFC. She also earned a black belt in karate.

She attended Heriot-Watt University as a sports scholar.

== Rugby career ==
=== Youth career ===
Poolman was selected for the national team in the under-18 category in 2020 and was selected again in 2022. She was selected for Scotland Futures and the Tri-nations competition in 2023, which took place in Italy.

=== Senior career ===
In 2022, she joined Watsonian FC and reached two consecutive finals of the Scottish Championship. In the 2023-2024 season, she was selected for the Edinburgh Rugby squad, who took part in the Celtic Challenge.

=== International career ===
In 2024-2025, she took part in the Celtic Challenge again. In March, she was part of the Scottish national team that took part in the Women's Six Nations tournament and made four appearance. She achieved her first international cap on 30 March against the French team. She was selected for the 32-player squad for the Women's Rugby World Cup in England in 2025. She played 60 minutes against Canada. The team reached Scotland's first World Cup quarter-final in 22 years.

She was part of the Scotland squad for the 2026 Women's Six Nations and made five appearances. She scored her first international try against Italy in May 2026, which was voted Try of the Round. In June 2026, it was announced that she will be one of the 47 contracted players to be supported by Scottish Rugby under a revised model in line with the new women's performance and pathways system.
