= Anna McGann =

- Born: 4 June 1998 (age 28) Athlone, Ireland
- Height: 180 cm (5 ft 11 in)

Rugby union career
- Position(s): Centre, Winger
Senior career
| Years | Team | Apps | (Points) |
- Railway Union
| 2024– | Clovers | 16 | (70) |
International career
| Years | Team | Apps | (Points) |
| 2022– | Ireland | 20 | (45) |
- Correct as of 17 October 2026
National sevens team
| Years | Team | | Comps |
| 2017– | Ireland 7s | | |

Anna McGann (born 4 June 1998) is an Irish international rugby union player from Athlone. She plays at centre or wing for the Clovers in the Celtic Challenge, the Ireland women's national rugby union team and the Irish National 7s team

== Biography ==
Born on 4 June 1998, McGann began playing hockey at the age of seven. She started playing hockey for Hermes Ladies' Hockey Club in Dublin, she was selected for the Leinster provincial team from the Under-16 category up to the Under-21 team. Tall for her age, she describes herself as very introverted. Her dream was to become an international hockey player and play in the Olympic Games. She enrolled at University College Dublin, not interested in her studies but in the hockey programme. She started playing rugby union, in addition to hockey, in order to become a better, more athletic hockey player. Identified by the Irish Rugby Football Union (IRFU), she was selected for a tournament in Vichy. Four weeks later, the union offered her a contract and she became a professional rugby sevens player.

Although she was not included in Ireland's squad for the 2022 Six Nations Tournament, she was called up to face Wales and France in the first two rounds.

She was omitted from the 2023 Six Nations squad, however she did and start against Italy in the third round. She was part of the Seven's team that qualified for the 2024 Olympic games in Paris. In June 2023, during the European Championships in the Algarve, she tore her anterior cruciate ligament; During her injury forced hiatus, she set up her own online jewellery store, a project which she had never found the time to launch. She returned to play in June 2024 after 12 months away from rugby. She was not selected in the Irish 7s team for the Olympics after taking part in the preparations. She travelled to Paris with her family to watch the competition, and aims to take part in the 2028 Olympic Games.

She made her debut with the Clovers, an 15s team supported by the IRFU, in the 2024-25 Celtic Challenge. She was selected in the Ireland Squad for the 2025 Six Nations. She scored a hat-trick of tries against Italy in round 2 of the tournament. It was announced in August 2025, that she was as a member of the Irish squad to the Rugby World Cup in England.

=== List of International Tries ===
| No. | Date | Venue | Opposition | Score | Result | Competition |
|---|---|---|---|---|---|---|
| 1 | 30 March 2025 | Stadio Sergio Lanfranchi | Italy | 12–0 | 54–12 | 2025 Six Nations |
| 2 | 30 March 2025 | Stadio Sergio Lanfranchi | Italy | 26–5 | 54–12 | 2025 Six Nations |
| 3 | 30 March 2025 | Stadio Sergio Lanfranchi | Italy | 54–12 | 54–12 | 2025 Six Nations |
| 4 | 9 August 2025 | Ravenhill Stadium | Canada | 12–40 | 26–47 | Freindly |
| 5 | 9 August 2025 | Ravenhill Stadium | Canada | 17–40 | 26–47 | Freindly |
| 6 | 31 August 2025 | Franklin's Gardens | Spain | 24–12 | 43–27 | 2025 Rugby World Cup |
| 7 | 31 August 2025 | Franklin's Gardens | Spain | 41–22 | 43–27 | 2025 Rugby World Cup |
| 8 | 11 April 2026 | Twickenham Stadium | England | 5–28 | 12–33 | 2026 Six Nations |
| 9 | 3 October 2026 | Virgin Media Park | Japan | 22–5 | 43–19 | Freindly |
