= Demelza Short =

English rugby player

- Born: 2006/2007
- School: Blundell's School
- University: Exeter College

Rugby union career
- Position(s): Flanker; Lock
- Current team: Bristol Bears
Senior career
| Years | Team | Apps | (Points) |
| 2025- | Bristol Bears | | |

Demelza Short is an English rugby union footballer who plays for Bristol Bears Women. She was selected for her debut for the senior England women's national rugby union team in April 2026.

== Club career ==
Short began playing rugby union at Launceston RC, and was educated at Blundell's School and Exeter College, Devon, for whom she played in the ACE Girls' League final in 2025.

Short plays in the second row, but can also play in the back row. She made her senior debut for Bristol Bears Women in a 58-7 victory over Leicester Tigers in the PWR Cup, in the first competitive game of the 2025-26 season on 25 August 2025. Her performances that season includes two tries in a 68-0 win over Leicester Tigers in March 2026 in the Premiership Women's Rugby. Having made eight league appearances for the club she signed a new contract with the club in April 2026.

== International career ==
Having previously played for England U18 and been called up for the England U21 side, in March 2026, she was called into the senior England women's national rugby union team for the first time, ahead of the 2026 Women's Six Nations Championship. Short made her debut in the starting XV at flanker for England against Scotland on 18 April 2026, as a 19 year-old, in an 84-7 victory. Short played as a replacement against France on the final day of the Championship, as England extended their unbeaten run to 38 matches and won a fifth consecutive grand slam in the event.
