= Haineala Lutui =

English rugby union player (born 2006)

- Born: 8 August 2006 (age 20) New Zealand
- School: Worcester Royal Grammar School
- University: Loughborough University
- Notable relative: Aleki Lutui (father)

Rugby union career
- Position: Number 8
- Current team: Loughborough Lightning
Senior career
Years	Team	Apps	(Points)
2025-	Loughborough Lightning		
International career
Years	Team	Apps	(Points)
2024	England U18		
2025-	England U20		

Haineala Lutui (born 8 August 2006) is an English rugby union player who plays as a number 8 for Premiership Women's Rugby side Loughborough Lightning.

== Club career ==
Lutui played for Worcester Rugby Club from under-13 through to under-18 level. She joined Premiership Women's Rugby side Loughborough Lightning in August 2024. She made her league debut in the opening fixture of the Premiership Women’s Rugby 2025-26 season against Harlequins Women on 28 October 2025, starting at number eight. Her performances for Loughborough included scoring two tries in a 19-12 win against Sale Sharks Women on 2 November 2025. In May 2026, she was nominated for Premiership Women's Rugby breakthrough player of the season and was named in the Rugby Players' Association’s Under-23 Team of the Season.

== International career ==
Lutui played for England at under-18 level. She made her England U20 in the 2025 Six Nations Summer Series. In March 2025, she was called-up to the England women's national rugby union team ahead of the 2025 Women's Six Nations Championship. In March 2026, she was called-up again for the England team prior to the 2026 Women's Six Nations Championship. She made her debut as a replacement for Morwenna Talling in England's opening game, a 33-12 victory against Ireland on 11 April. The following weekend she scored her first international try in an 84-7 win against Scotland on 18 April.

== Personal life ==
Born in New Zealand, she is of Tongan descent; the daughter of Tongan former rugby union international Aleki Lutui. She attended Worcester Royal Grammar School in England.
