= Carla Neisen =

France international rugby union & league player

- Full name: Carla Sophie Neisen
- Born: 8 March 1996 (age 30) Bugue, Dordogne, Nouvelle-Aquitaine, France
- Height: 1.63 m (5 ft 4 in)
- Weight: 69 kg (152 lb)

Rugby union career
- Position: Center
Senior career
Years	Team	Apps	(Points)
2013–	Blagnac SCR		
International career
Years	Team	Apps	(Points)
2012–	France	23	(5)
National sevens team
Years	Team		Comps
2014–	France		
Medal record
Women's rugby sevens
Representing France
Rugby World Cup Sevens
Bronze medal – third place	2022 Cape Town	Team competition

Carla Sophie Neisen (born 8 March 1996) is a French rugby union player. She plays for Blagnac SCR and for the France women's national rugby union team.

== Rugby career ==
Neisen plays as a center for the Blagnac women's rugby club and for the France women's national rugby union team since 2012.

Neisen competed at the 2020 Tokyo Summer Olympics, where the team won a silver medal. She also played at the 2022 Rugby World Cup Sevens and won a bronze medal.

She represented France at the 2024 Summer Olympics.

On 2 August 2025, she was selected in the French XVs side to the Women's Rugby World Cup in England.

== Family ==
She is the younger sister of Anderson Neisen, and the cousin of rugby player Enzo Hervé.

== Awards ==
- Ordre national du Mérite (8 September 2021 decree)
