= Alyssa D'Incà =

Italian rugby player

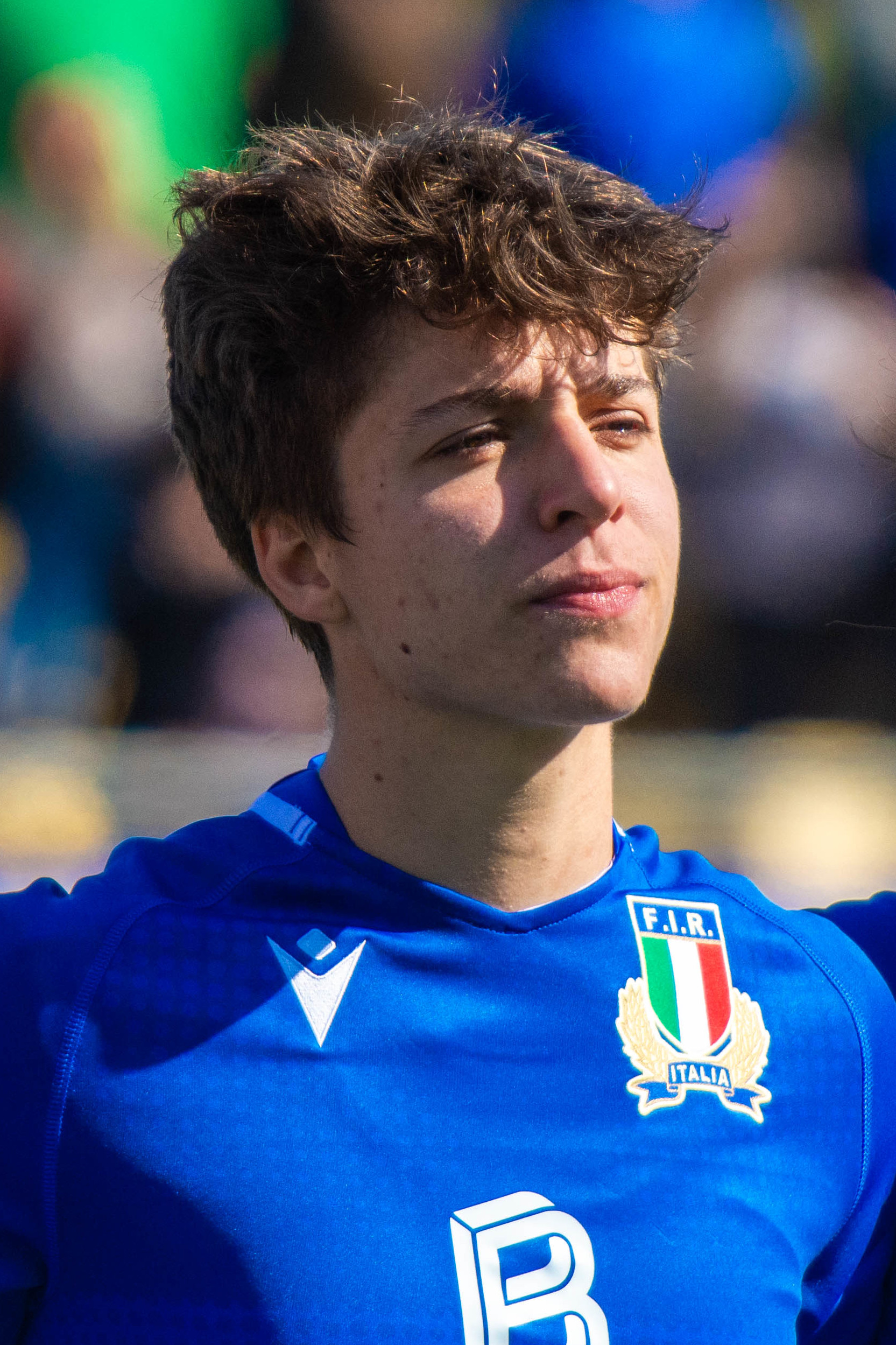
- D'Incà in 2022
- Born: 23 March 2002 (age 24)
- Height: 172 cm (5 ft 8 in)
- Weight: 64 kg (141 lb)

Rugby union career
- Position: Centre
- Current team: Blagnac SCR
Senior career
Years	Team	Apps	(Points)
2020–25	Villorba		
2025–	Blagnac SCR		
International career
Years	Team	Apps	(Points)
2021–	Italy	35	(70)
- Correct as of 6 September 2025

Alyssa D'Incà (born 23 March 2002) is an Italian rugby union player who plays at centre for Blagnac SCR and Italy women's national rugby union team.

== Career ==
She is from Belluno in the Veneto region of northern Italy. She plays domestically for A. S. D. Villorba Rugby. She made her debut for the Italy women's national rugby union team at the age of 19 years-old in 2021, having been first called up to train with the national side in September 2020. She was part of the Italian team that finished second behind Scotland for the WXV2 title in 2023.

She won try of the championships for an effort she scored for Italy against France in the Women's Six Nations Championship in April 2024, in which she ran 60 metres from inside her own half of the field. She was also nominated for the player of the championships award.

In November 2024, she was nominated for International Rugby Players Women's Try of the Year at the World Rugby Awards for a try she scored against Scotland in the Women's Six Nations Championship.

On 11 August 2025, she was named in the Italian side to the Women's Rugby World Cup in England.
