= Axelle Berthoumieu =

French rugby union player (born 2000)

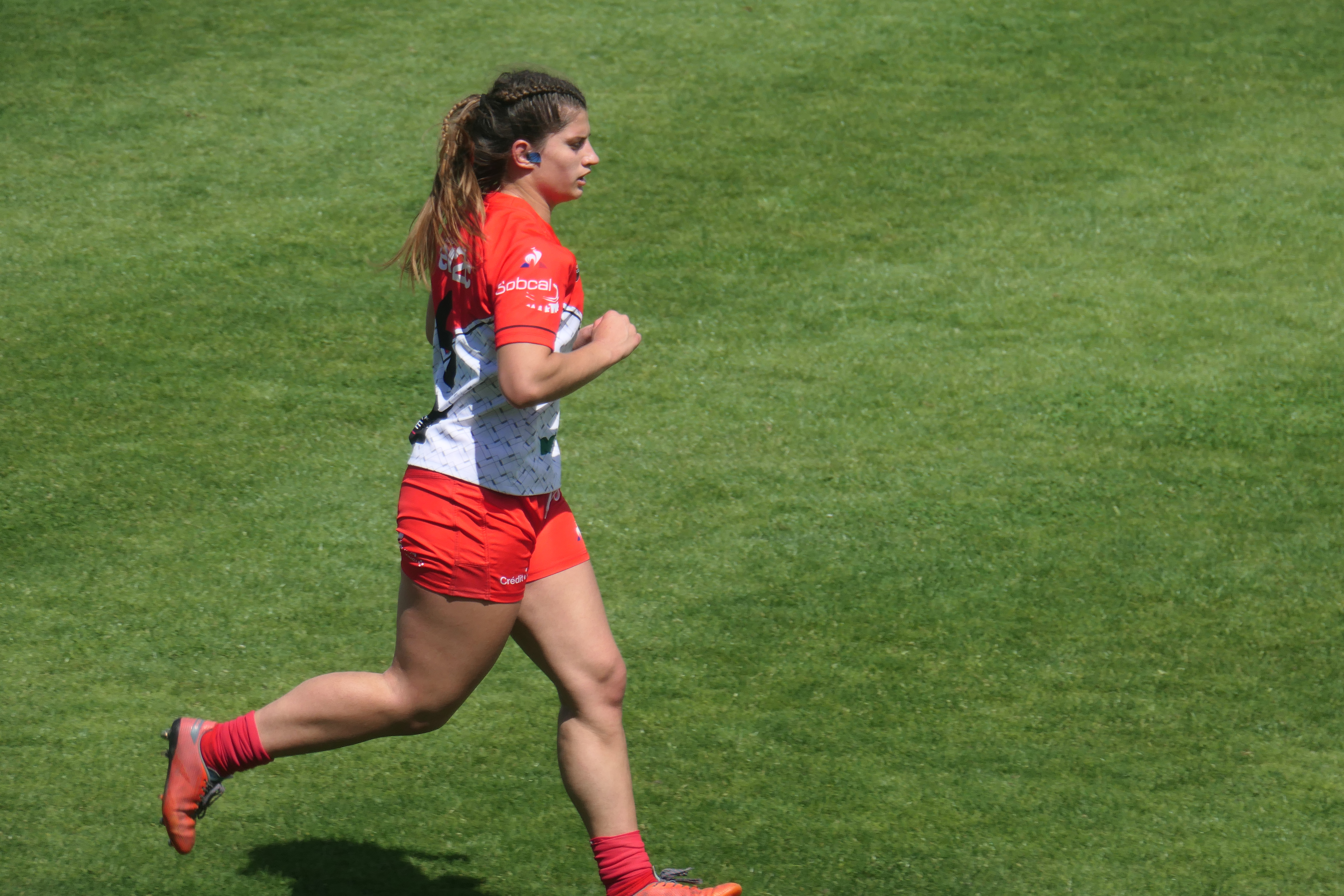
- Berthoumieu in 2022
- Born: 9 July 2000 (age 26)
- Height: 1.71 m (5 ft 7 in)
- Weight: 75 kg (165 lb)

Rugby union career
- Position: Flanker
Senior career
Years	Team	Apps	(Points)
2017–	Blagnac Rugby		(0)
International career
Years	Team	Apps	(Points)
2019–Present	France	26	(0)

Axelle Berthoumieu (born 9 July 2000) is a French rugby union player. She plays flanker for France internationally and club rugby for Blagnac.

== Rugby career ==
Berthoumieu plays for Blagnac. She was named in France's squad for the 2022 Women's Six Nations Championship as well as the 2023 Championship.

On 7 March 2025, she was called into the side for the Women's Six Nations Championship.

She also made the selection to the squad for the 2025 Women's Rugby World Cup in England. She was cited for allegedly biting Irish flanker, Aoife Wafer, during their quarter-final match at Sandy Park.
