= Nathalie Amiel =

French rugby union player

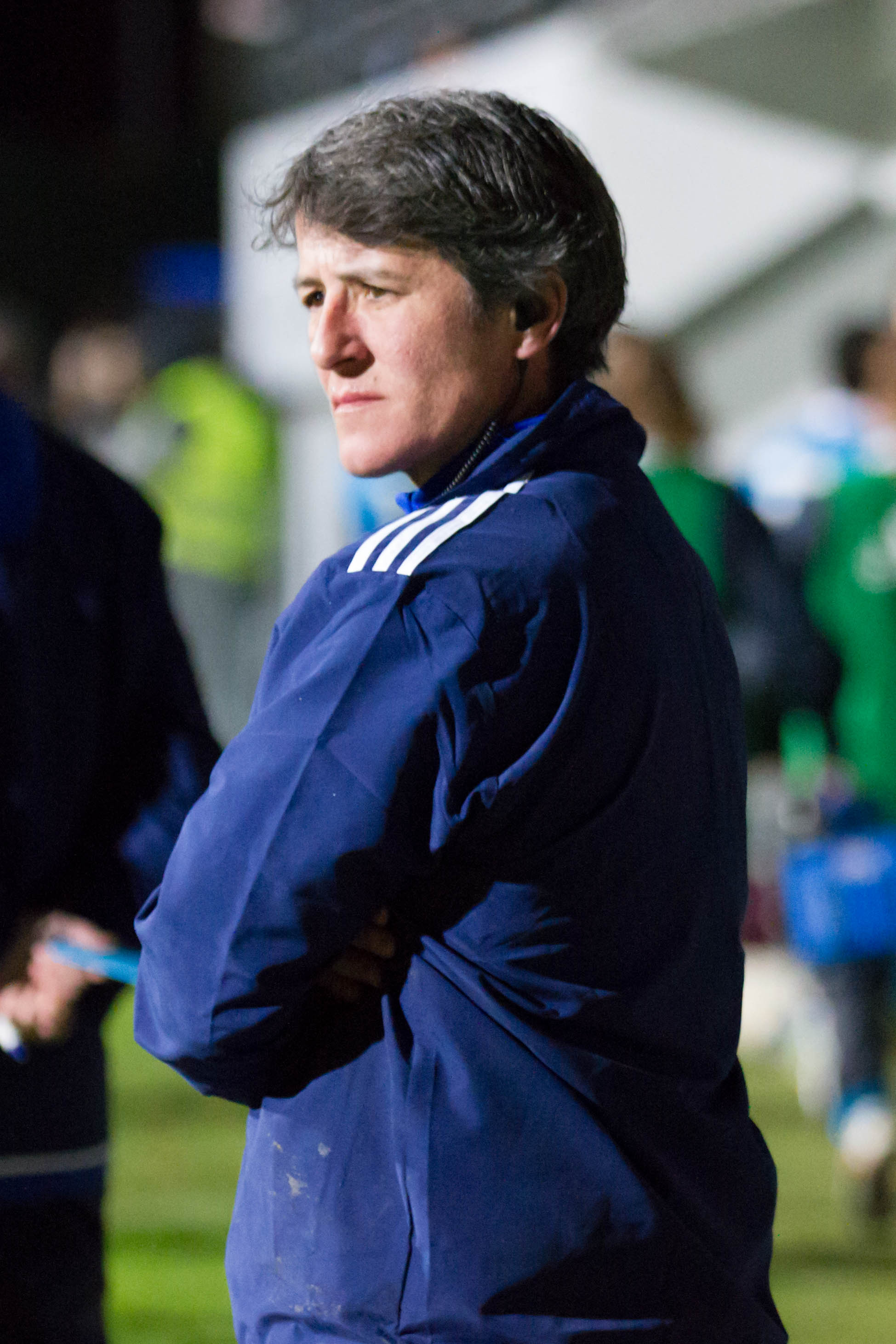
- Amiel at the 2014 Women's Six Nations Championship - France, Italy
- Born: November 4, 1970 (age 56) Béziers, France
- Height: 1.68 m (5 ft 6 in)
- Weight: 74 kg (163 lb; 11 st 9 lb)

Rugby union career
- Position: Centre
International career
Years	Team	Apps	(Points)
1986–2002	France	56	
Coaching career
- Years: Team
- 2009–2012: France

Nathalie Amiel (born November 4, 1970) is a former French rugby union player. She represented France at three World Cups, in 1991, 1994, and the 2002 Women's Rugby World Cup. She debuted for France against Great Britain in 1986 at the age of 15.

Amiel practised judo when she was young. Her mother registered her for a club which offered women's rugby when she was 12. Her initial position was flanker. She switched to centre near the end of her playing career in 2002.

Amiel was inducted into the IRB Hall of Fame on 17 November 2014.
