= Robyn O'Connor =

Irish rugby union player (born 2005)

- Born: 15 July 2005 (age 21)

Rugby union career
- Position(s): Full back, Wing
Youth career
- Wexford Wanderers
Senior career
Years	Team	Apps	(Points)
2024-	Wexford Wanderers RFC		
Provincial / State sides
Years	Team	Apps	(Points)
2024-	Leinster Rugby		
International career
Years	Team	Apps	(Points)
2026-	Ireland		
National sevens team
Years	Team		Comps
2024-	Ireland 7s		

Robyn O'Connor (born 15 July 2005) is an Irish rugby union player who plays at full-back or wing for Leinster Rugby, and the Ireland sevens and Ireland women's national rugby union team.

== Early life ==
From County Wexford, she attended Loreto Secondary School in Wexford for whom she played provincial schools rugby union. She also played club rugby as a youngster for Wexford Wanderers from the under-14 age-group level onwards.

== Career ==
She started playing club rugby union for the senior Wexford Wanderers side. In 2024, she played at both full-back and wing for the Ireland women's national under-20 rugby team.

In August 2024, she was awarded a central contract by The Irish Rugby Football Union. That month, she made her debut as a substitute for Leinster Rugby against Munster. She went on to make her full debut the next week, starting in their match against Ulster. She scored a fourth-minute try on her full debut to help Leinster into the Women's Interprovincial final.

She received her first call-up to the senior Ireland women's national rugby union team for the 2024 WXV, held in Canada in the autumn of 2024.

She made her debut for Ireland sevens at the Dubai Sevens in the 2024–25 SVNS series, starting three matches at the tournament. She also featured at the subsequent South Africa Sevens in December 2024. She represented Ireland at the Hong Kong Sevens in 2025, scoring a try in Ireland's opening match against Fiji.

On 18 April 2026, O'Connor made a try-scoring debut in the Six Nations playing on the left wing against Italy in a 57–20 victory in Galway.

== Personal life ==
Her father James is a coach at Wexford Wanderers Rugby Club. She also plays senior camogie for her club Glynn-Barntown.
