= Veronica Madia =

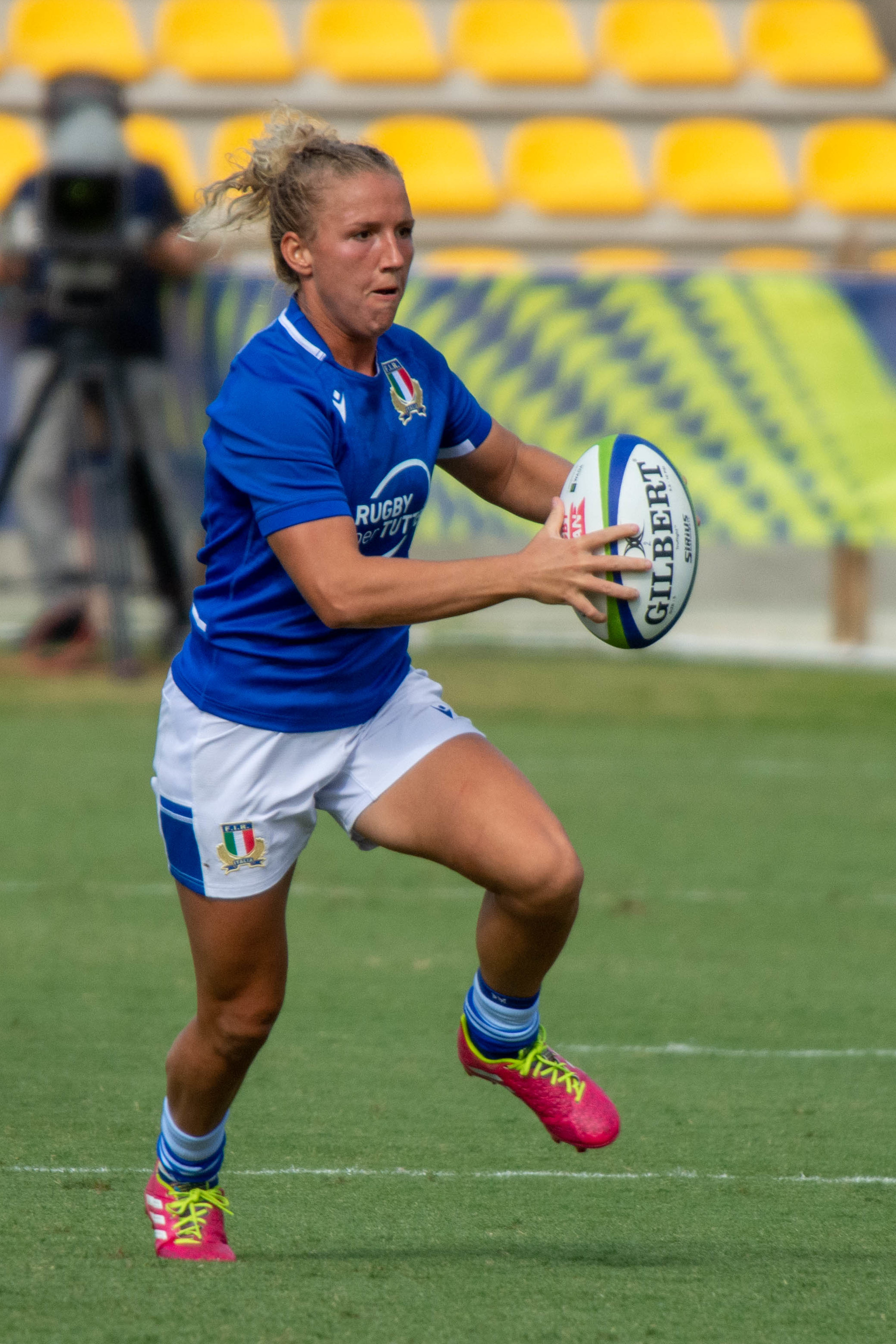
- Madìa in action against Spain during the European Qualifiers for the 2021 World Cup
- Born: 16 January 1995 (age 31)
- Height: 170 cm (5 ft 7 in)
- Weight: 65 kg (143 lb; 10 st 3 lb)

Rugby union career
- Position: Fly-half
Senior career
Years	Team	Apps	(Points)
2013–23	Rugby Colorno		(0)
2023–24	FC Grenoble Amazones		
2024–25	Rugby Colorno		
2025–	Blagnac SCR		
International career
Years	Team	Apps	(Points)
2016–	Italy	60	(10)

Veronica Madia (born 16 January 1995) is an Italian rugby union player. She plays fly-half for Italy internationally and for Blagnac SCR at club level.

== Rugby career ==
Madia played for a Colorno mixed team at the age of seven but had to stop at thirteen because the club did not have a women's team. She resumed her rugby career at 16 when a women's team was established by the Parmigiano club.

In 2016 she was called into the Italian national team where she made her debut in Bologna in the Six Nations Championship, in Italy's 22–7 victory against Scotland which gave Italy qualification for the 2017 Women's Rugby World Cup.

As captain of Colorno she led the team to the 2016–17 championship final, won 32–0 by Valsugana; she was subsequently part of the Azzurri squad for the 2017 Women's Rugby World Cup in Ireland, where Italy finished ninth.

Madia helped Colorno win the 2017–18 season. She was named in Italy's squad for the 2025 Women's Six Nations Championship.

On 11 August 2025, she was named in the Italian side to the Women's Rugby World Cup in England.
