= Léa Murie =

French rugby player

Léa Murie (born 21 May 1998 Lagny-sur-Marne) is a French international rugby union player, playing as a winger.

== Biography ==
Léa Murie was born on 21 May 1998 in Lagny-sur-Marne. She grew up in Saugnac-et-Cambran, she studied in Dax, then at the high school of Borda. She played rugby union with the Pachys d'Herm from 2012.

Once she obtained her baccalaureate in France, she undertook studies in STAPS and joined the Lionesses of the UBB, women's section of the Stade Bordelais, from the 2016–2017 season. She joined the Stade Toulousain women's team from the 2018–2019 season.

She played her first match with the French women's team in the 2019 Six Nations Championship on February 2, 2019, against Wales. She scored two tries during this match. She competed in the 2022 Women's Six Nations Championship.
