= Francesca Sgorbini =

Italian rugby union player

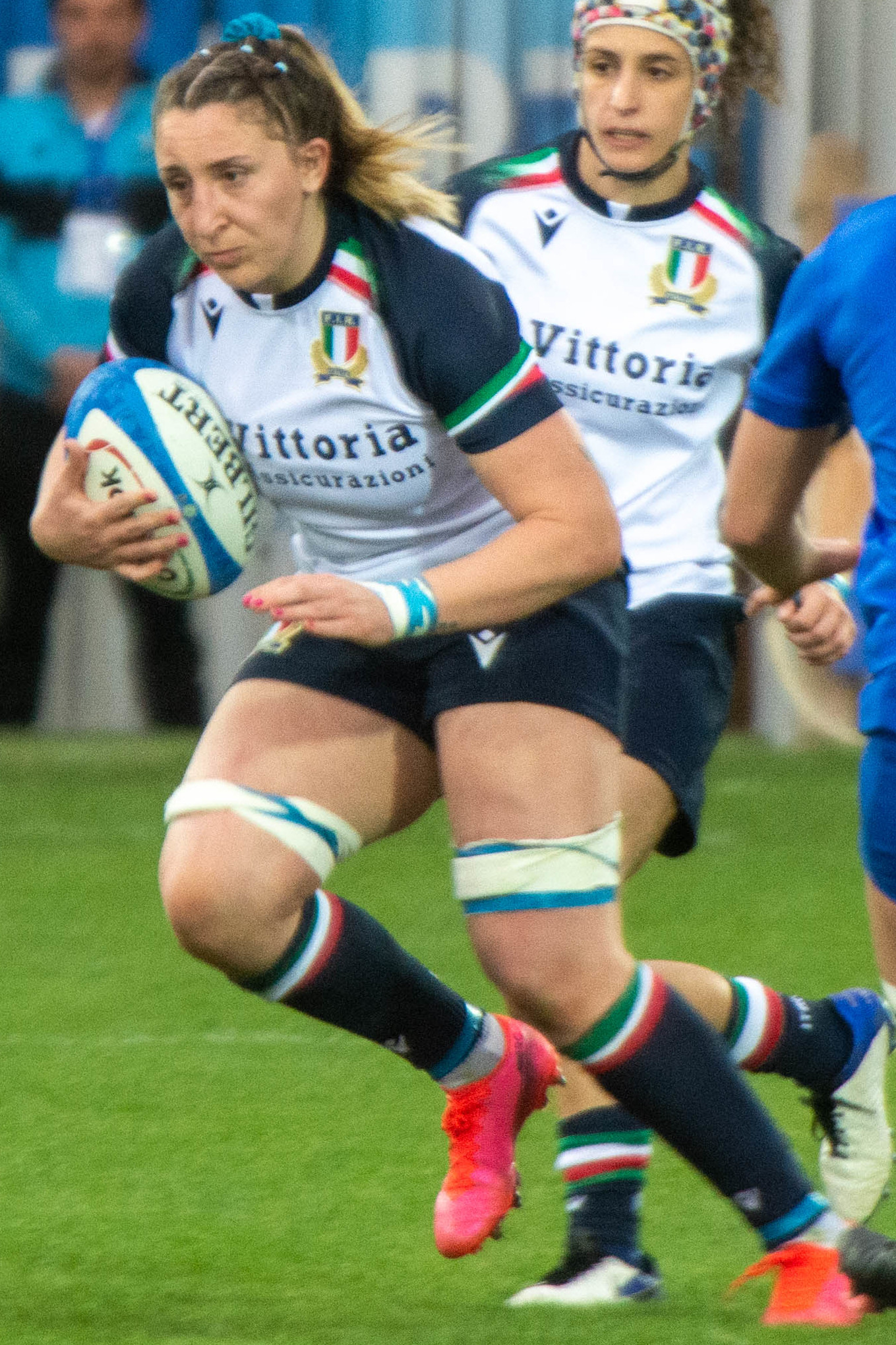
- Sgorbini in 2023
- Born: 7 January 2001 (age 25) Pesaro
- Height: 1.74 m (5 ft 9 in)
- Weight: 76 kg (168 lb)

Rugby union career
- Position: Back Row
Senior career
Years	Team	Apps	(Points)
	Colorno		(0)
2020–	ASM Romagnat		(0)
International career
Years	Team	Apps	(Points)
2019–	Italy	37	(15)

Francesca Sgorbini (born 7 January 2001) is an Italian rugby union player. She is a Back row for the Italy women's national rugby union team, and for French club, ASM Romagnat. She competed at the 2021 Rugby World Cup.

== Rugby career ==
Sgorbini was part of the successful Colorno side that won the national title for the first time in the 2017–2018 season. She previously played for French club, ASM Romagnat.

She made her international debut against England during the Six Nations tournament on 9 March 2019. She also participated in the 2020 and 2021 Six Nations Championship's. She joined ASM Romagnat in 2020.

Sgorbini featured for Italy in their warm-up matches against France ahead of the World Cup. She was selected in Italy's squad for the delayed 2021 Rugby World Cup in New Zealand.

She was named in the Italian side for the 2025 Women's Six Nations Championship. In their opening match against England in March, she scored her nations only try in their 5–38 defeat. On 11 August 2025, she was named in the Italian squad to the Women's Rugby World Cup in England.
