= Catherine Richards =

Canadian artist (born 1947)

Professor Emerita Catherine Richards
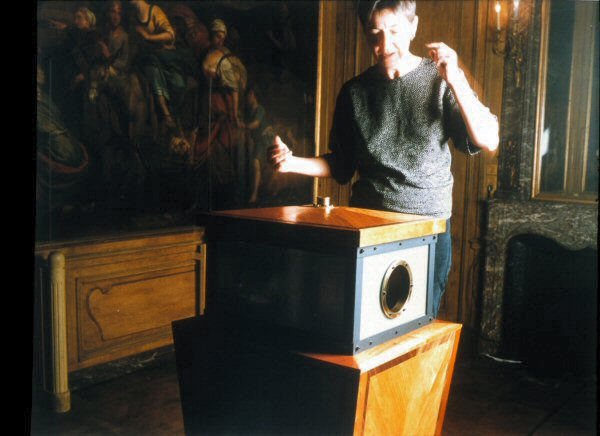
- Richards with her work "Virtual Body"
- Born: 1947 (age 78–79); Ottawa, Ontario, Canada
- Education: Honours Bachelor of Arts in English (York University), Honours Bachelor of Arts in Visual Arts (University of Ottawa)
- Alma mater: York University, University of Ottawa
- Known for: New Media, Virtual reality artist
- Notable work: Virtual Body, Shroud/Chrysalis, L'Intrus, Curiosity Cabinet at the end of the Millennium, Charged Hearts
- Movement: New Media Arts
- Awards: Individual Fellow Award, World Technology Network (2006), Canada Council for the Arts, Petro-Canada Media Biennial Arts award for outstanding and innovative use of new technologies in media arts (1993), Canadian Conference of the Arts Corel Prize for innovative projects in arts and new technologies (1992), High End Computer Graphics and Grand Prize Computer Graphics prize (1987)
- Elected: Invited member of a Selection Committee, 2018 National Doctoral Awards competition, Social Sciences and Humanities Research Council (SSHRC)
- Website: catherinerichards.ca

Catherine Richards (born August 4, 1947) is a Canadian visual artist who uses information technologies and electronic media in mixed-media installations and performances. Her work centers on the "archaeology" of media, and explores ideas such as virtuality, electronic media as metaphor, and the "separation of the senses". Richards also investigates the boundaries of the human body and its volatility, particularly in relation to electromagnetic fields, with networked technologies rendering these boundaries increasingly permeable and uncertain. Her work makes visible the invisible infrastructures surrounding contemporary bodies, from wireless signals to high-voltage currents.

Richards' practice is rooted in collaborative, interdisciplinary projects that investigate the relationship between the human body and technology. Her work addresses themes such as perception, immersion, and isolation. Richards has been identified as one of the first artists in Canada to work with virtual reality.

Her practice is informed by early influences in media theory, philosophies of technology, and the ways that the body is visualized through scientific metaphors. She is influenced by Marshall McLuhan (and his use of William Blake's philosophy on technology and the senses), Harold Innis, and George Grant. Paul Virilio's writing on the philosophy of technology and aesthetics has also played a role, along with the work of Jean Baudrillard and Gilles Deleuze. Richards notes the historical Russian avant-garde as an influence.

== Education ==
Born and raised in Ottawa, Catherine Richards earned a B.A. (Honours) in English from York University in 1971 and a B.A. (Honours) in Visual Arts from the University of Ottawa in 1980. In 1997, she was granted doctoral equivalency by the University of Ottawa under Article 23.4.2.3.

== Practice ==
Richards' practice is rooted in collaborative projects that bring together interdisciplinary teams to investigate the human body in relation to science and technology. She is concerned with agency and connection, as well as immersion and isolation. Richards also explores human emotions, attempting to model the slippage between physiology and emotions in her work.

Her practice is informed by her earliest influences in media theory, philosophies of technology, the technologized body, and early concepts of posthumanism. The philosophical grounding of her work draws on the scholarship of Marshall McLuhan, Harold Innis, and George Grant. During her tenure with the Canadian Government, she worked in various positions at the Canadian Radio and Television Commission, Federal Department of Communications, and the Canadian Broadcasting Corporation, providing access to some of the earliest developments in computer graphics. She also worked with the National Film Board of Canada under the leadership of Pierre Trudeau. Paul Virilio's writing on the philosophy of technology and aesthetics played a role in her practice.

== Notable works ==
=== Curiosity Cabinet at the End of the Millennium ===
Curiosity Cabinet at the End of the Millennium (1995) inverts the historical logic of the curiosity cabinet, transforming the viewing subject into the viewed object. The participant climbs inside and closes the door, completing a circuit that transforms the cabinet into what Richards terms a 'safe house', a Faraday cage that conducts radio frequencies, microwaves, television signals, cellular transmissions, and other elements of the upper RF spectrum through its copper surfaces and into the earth via a thick braided ground wire. Inside, the participant becomes simultaneously protected and displayed: visible through the copper screening to outside viewers, yet electromagnetically isolated, unplugged from human-generated frequencies.

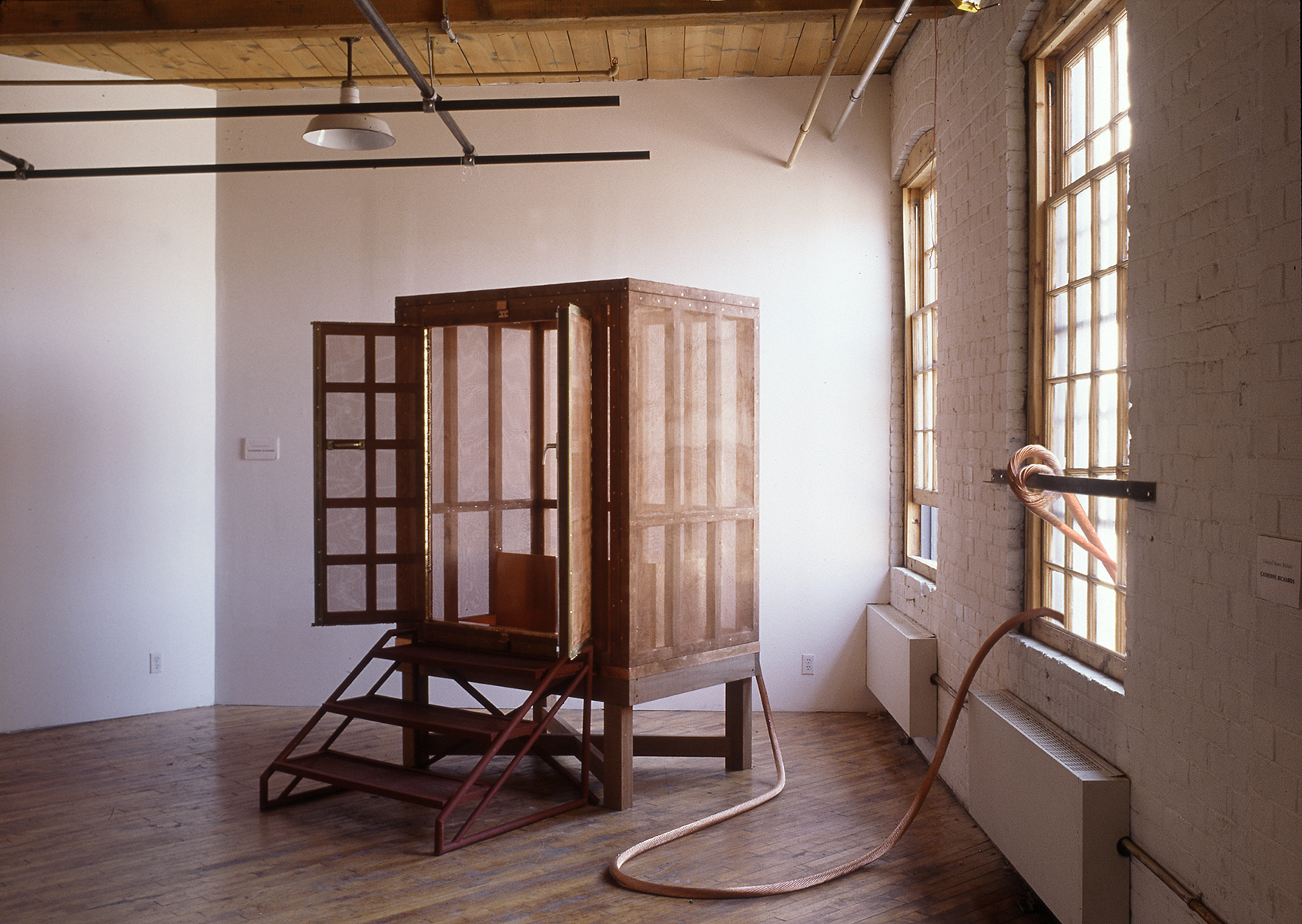
Curiosity Cabinet at the End of the Millennium (1995), Commissioned for Self Determination/Body Politic at the Gemeentemuseum, Arnhem, Holland.

=== Charged Hearts ===
Charged Hearts (1997) consists of three principal types of objects: the central Terrella orb, two anatomically correct glass hearts, and an online game. The Terrella orb contains phosphorescent charged gases, alluding to the original use in the nineteenth century to replicate Aurora Borealis, while also simulating the Earth’s magnetic poles. Within the Terrella is a cathode ray, the technological basis for television and computer screens. The pair of glass hearts glow within their bell jars (themselves vessels that allow observation), being electrically charged by the Terrella. For viewers to safely handle the hearts and lift them up, the organs are encased in glass and loosely tethered by a copper coil at their bases. Embracing the domes evokes changes in the Terrella and hearts, prompting pulsations in light intensity, as viewers become material participants in the electrical current. The glass hearts are charged both literally and figuratively; the human heart remains the symbolic seat of emotions and is also a very real electromagnetic field. The excited electrons flutter and pulse within the vacuum sealed hearts and activate changes in the Terrella. When touched, a shadowy heart appears in the phosphorescent gases."

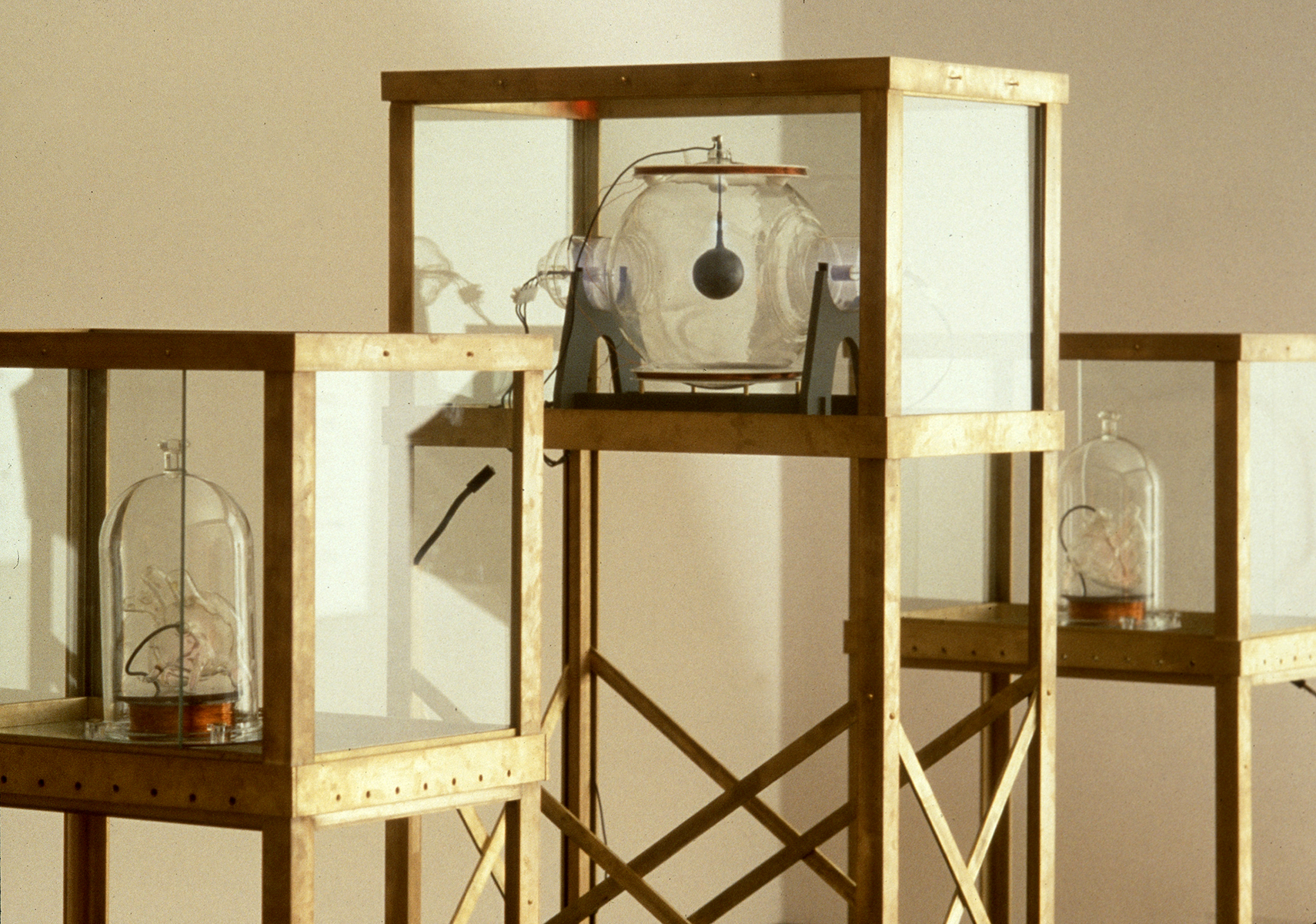
Charged Hearts (1997), Commissioned by the National Gallery of Canada.

== Exhibitions ==
=== Solo exhibitions ===
Source unless otherwise cited:

2014

- When Objects Have Agency. Open Gallery, OCADU. Toronto, Ontario.
- Objects That Make Us. The Manitoba Museum. Winnipeg, Manitoba.

2007

- Health Care, Technologies and Places (HTCP): Contributions and Provocations from Humanists and Artists. University of Toronto. Toronto, Ontario.

2000

- Excitable Tissues. Ottawa Art Gallery. Ottawa, Ontario.
- Art, Science, and Creativity. National Research Council of Canada. Ottawa, Ontario.
- Creativity 2000. National Research Council of Canada. Ottawa, Ontario.

1999

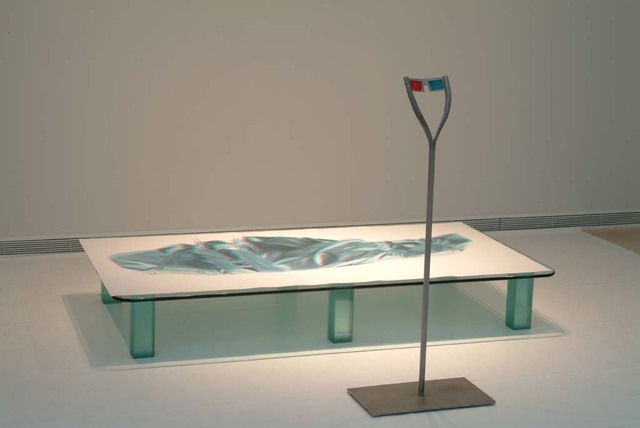
Shroud / Chrysalis II (2006), Resonance: The Electromagnetic Bodies Project. Ludwig Museum, Museum of Contemporary Art.

- Curiosities. Dunlop Art Gallery. Regina, Saskatchewan.

1998

- Charged Hearts. Elaine L. Jacob Gallery, Wayne State University. Detroit, Michigan.
- Charged Hearts. Powerplant Gallery. Harbourfront, Toronto, Ontario.

1997

- Charged Hearts. Commissioned, National Gallery of Canada. Ottawa, Ontario.

1980

- Sites. Warehouse Wellington Street. Montreal, Quebec.

c1970s

- Closed Circuit Pieces. Pestalozzi College. Ottawa, Ontario.

=== Group Exhibitions ===
Source unless otherwise cited:

2024

- Art School Confidential. Ottawa Art Gallery. Ottawa, Ontario.

2019

- 24/7. Somerset House. London, UK.
- Carbon and Light. Ottawa Art Gallery. Ottawa, Ontario.

2018

- Àdisòkàmagan / Nous connaître un peu nous-mêmes / We'll all become stories. Ottawa Art Gallery. Ottawa, Ontario.

2017

- Corpus. New Media Gallery. Vancouver, British Columbia.
- Great and North. Istituto Veneto Scienze, Lettere ed Arti. Venice, Italy.

2016

- The Body Electric. Virtual Exhibition. Royal College of Physicians and International Conference on Residency Education.
- Hybrid Bodies. Kunstkraftwerk. Leipzig, Germany.

2015

- The Age of Catastrophe. Actual Contemporary & Video Pool Media Arts Centre, Winnipeg, Manitoba.
- Hearts and Minds. Hannah Maclure Centre, University of Abertay Dundee, Scotland.
- Flesh of the World. Doris McCarthy Gallery. Toronto, Ontario.

2014

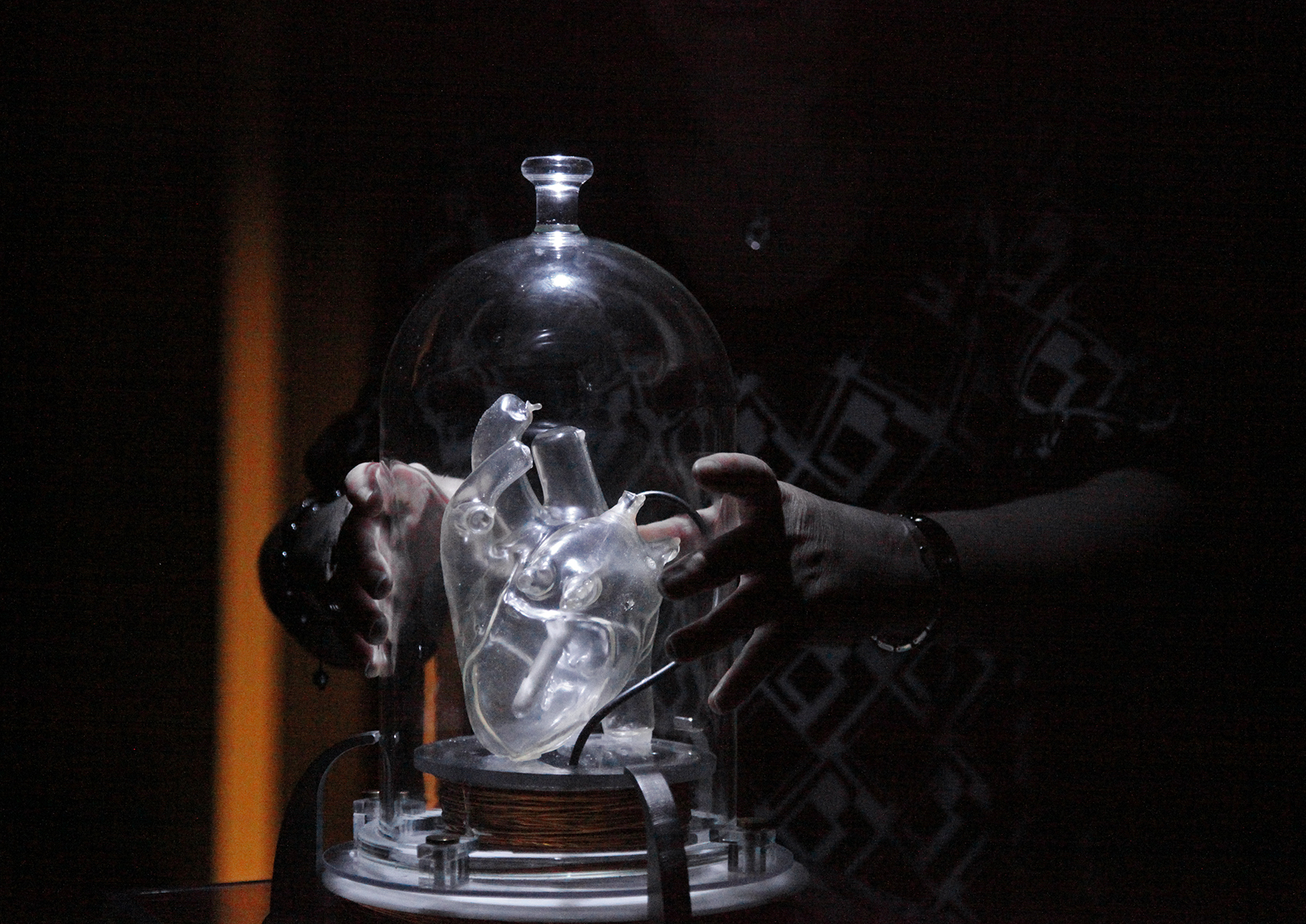
L’intrus (2012), YYZ Gallery, Toronto, ON

- Still Lives. PHI Centre, Montreal, PQ.

2013

- Transitio_MX 05 Biomediaciones. New Media Art and Video Festival. Mexico City, Mexico.
- Patent Pending. ZERO1 Garage. San Jose, California.
- Heart of the Moment: Selections from the Permanent Collection. 25th Anniversary. Ottawa Art Gallery. Ottawa, Ontario.
- Hybrid Bodies. PHI, Concordia University, Montreal, PQ. 2012 SPLICE: At the Intersection of Art & Medicine. Blackwood Gallery, University of Toronto Art Centre, Toronto, Ontario.
- L'intrus. YYZ Gallery, Toronto, Ontario.
- Mirror Neurons: AV Festival. The National Glass Centre, University of Sunderland, Sunderland, UK.

2010

- PROTOTYPE, Electric Fields: Festival of Electronic Art and Sound. Karsh-Masson Gallery. Ottawa, Ontario.

2008

- SPECTROPIA. 10th International Festival for New Media Culture, Art+Communications. Riga City Exhibition Hall. Riga, Latvia.
- Imagining Science: An Exploration of Science, Society and Social Change. Art Gallery of Alberta. Edmonton, Alberta.

2007

- e-art, Les vases communicants. Montreal Museum of Fine Arts. Montreal, Quebec.
- Global Eyes. ACM SIGGRAPH. San Diego, California.
- Science in Art. Virtual exhibition Galerie de l'UQAM (Université du Québec à Montréal) Virtual Museum of Canada.

2006

- Resonance: The Electromagnetic Bodies Project. V2/TENT. Rotterdam, Netherlands.
- Resonance: The Electromagnetic Bodies Project. Ludwig Museum, Museum of Contemporary Art. Budapest, Hungary.
- Resonance: The Electromagnetic Bodies Project. Centro Cultural Conde Duque Medialab. Madrid, Spain.
- Resonance: The Electromagnetic Bodies Project. Maison européenne de la photographie (MEP). Paris, France.

2005

- Resonance: The Electromagnetic Bodies Project. ZKM: Center for Art and Media. Karlsruhe, Germany.
- Resonance: The Electromagnetic Bodies Project. Oboro. Montreal, Quebec.
- Digital Discourse. St James Cavalier Centre for Creativity. Valletta, Malta.
- The Art Formally Known as New Media. Walter Phillips Gallery. The Banff Centre for the Arts. Banff, Alberta.

2004

- As yet unnameable. Bard College. Annandale-on-Hudson, New York.
- Sydney Biennale 2004. Sydney, Australia.

2000

- Engaging the Virtual. Dalhousie Art Gallery. Halifax, Nova Scotia.

1998

- Aurora. Interaccess Gallery. Toronto, Ontario.
- Cyber Heart. Walter Phillips Gallery, Banff Centre for the Arts. Banff, Alberta.

1995

- Curiosity Cabinet, at the End of the Millennium. International Symposium of Electronic Art (ISEA), Montreal, Quebec.
- Self Determination / Body Politic. Gemeentemuseum. Arnhem, Holland.
- Time, Space and Realities. A Space Gallery. Toronto, Ontario.
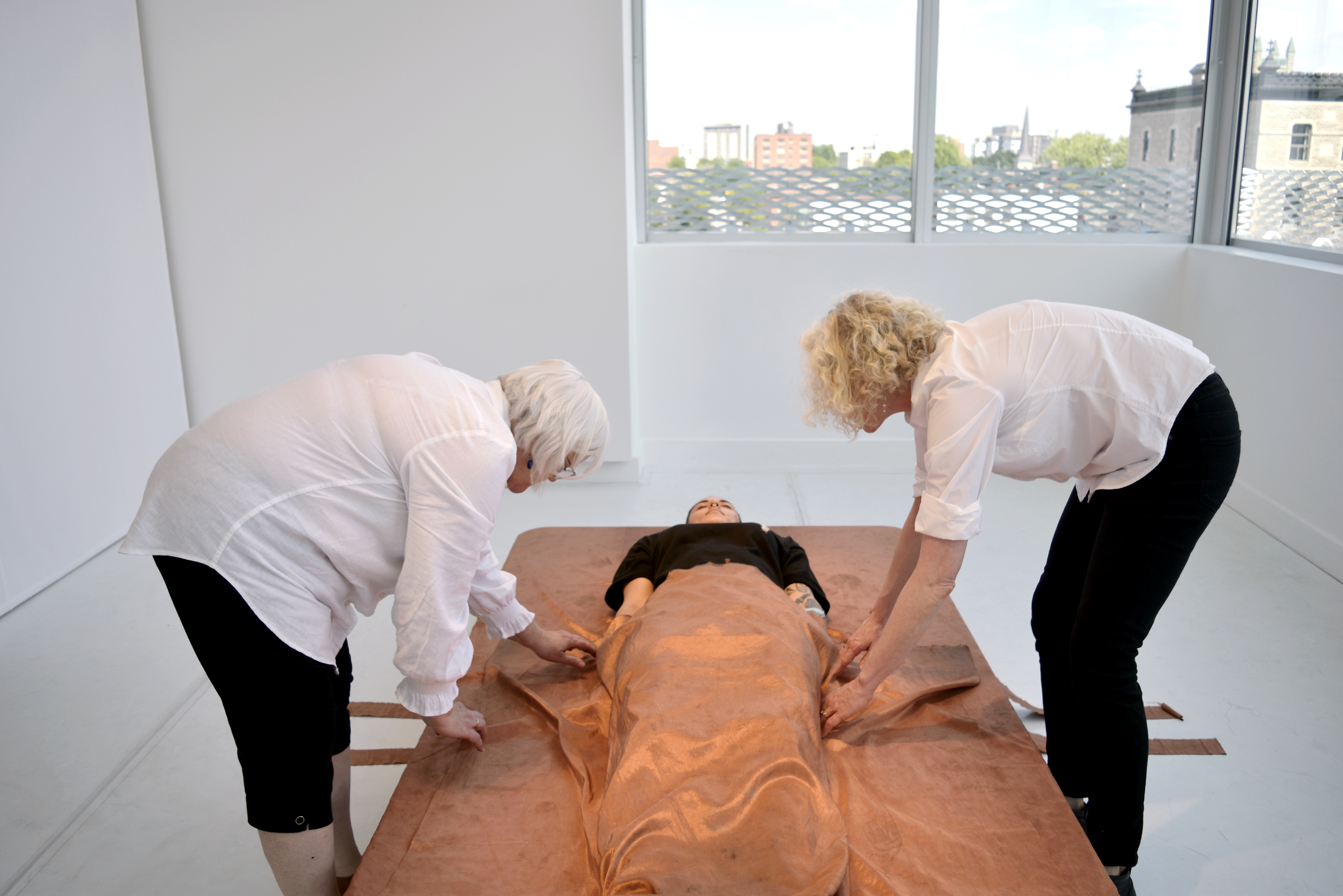
  Shroud (2018), Àdisòkàmagan / Nous connaître un peu nous-mêmes / We'll all become stories. Ottawa Art Gallery. Ottawa, ON.

1994

- The Body Obsolete. SAW Gallery. Ottawa, Ontario.
- Arte Virtual. Metro Opera. Madrid, Spain.
- 15 years of Ars Electronica. Landesgalerie, Museum of Contemporary Art. Linz, Austria.
- The Virtual Body. The International Symposium of Electronic Art (ISEA). Helsinki, Finland.

1993

- State of the Image. Eldorado Museum. Antwerp, Belgium.
- Teckno Viscera. Institute of Modern Art. Fortitude Valley, Australia.

1981

- Circuit + -. Galerie Motivation Cinq. Montreal, Quebec.

1979

- Recent Work and Work in Progress. SAW Gallery. Ottawa, Ontario.

1973

- Multi-monitor Installations and Performance pieces. First Women and Film International Festival. Ottawa, Ontario.

== Selected publications by the artist ==
- "Hearts and Agency." Jill Scott (ed) TRANSDISCOURSE 3: Gender in Art, Science and Body Politics. Vienna: De Gruyter, 2019.
- "Hybrid Bodies: Rethinking Heart Transplantation." The Faculty of Fine Arts, Concordia University. (Montreal, Quebec) pp 40–49, 2016.
- "Excitable Tissues and Virtual Worlds: Art, Science, and Technology". Inno'va-tion: Essays by Leading Canadian Researchers. (Canadian Foundation for Innovation, 2002) www.innovation.ca Republished: Judith Miller (ed), Reading & Writing Canada. (New York: W.W. Norton & Company). Approximately pp 4, 2005.
- "Tactical Zones: Collapse of the Visual". Cartographies: The General Assembly on New Media Art / Cartographies: Les États généraux de nouveau médias: Conference Proceedings. Montreal: Inter-Society for the Electronic Arts / L'Inter-Société des arts électroniques. 2000.
- "Body Boundaries". Paul Hertz (ed). YLEM.19.2, Jan/Feb. pp 15–24, 1999.
- "Fungal Intimacy: The Cyborg Trope in Feminism and Media Art." in Lyn Hershman Leeson (ed), Clicking In: Hot Links to a Digital Culture. (San Francisco: Bay Press) pp 258–263, 1996.
- "It's Déjà Vu All Over Again: Virtual Reality." Canadas. (New York: Semiotext(e)) pp 264–267, 1994.
- "Virtual Bodies: What a Blow that Phantom Gave Me". Angles of Incidence: reflections of multimedia artworks. Proceedings of the Multimedia Communications '93 Conference, International Council or Computer Communications, Banff, April, 1993. Banff: Media Arts Program – Banff Centre for the Arts, pp 15–22, 1993.
- Richards, Catherine and Nell Tenhaaf eds. Virtual Seminar on the Bioapparatus. Banff Centre for the Arts, 120 pp, 1991.
- "Virtual Reality: The Rebirth of Pure Art?". Woman's Art. 41: 4–6, 1991.
- "Virtual Worlds, Digital Images". American Film Institute Video Festival. Los Angeles, CA: American Film Institute, pp 66–67, 1987.
- "Mapping a Sensibility: Computer Imaging". SIGGRAPH' 83: Exhibition of Computer Art. Chicago, IL: Siggraph - Special Interest group for Computer Graphics and Animation, pp 21, 1983.
- "Computer Culture". Agenda. 5.1:17-21 (Spring) 1982.

== Selected bibliography ==
=== 2025 ===
- Arozqueta, Claudia. Heartbeat Art. Cambridge: MIT Press, 2025.

=== 2024 ===
- Asselin, Olivier. Art School Confidential. Ottawa: Ottawa Art Gallery, 2024.

=== 2023 ===
- Heeyoung, Kim. "Media Archaeology Methodology and Artistic Practice." Public Art, Volume 20 (2023): 38.

=== 2022 ===
- Century, Michael. Northern Sparks : Innovation, Technology Policy, and the Arts in Canada from Expo ’67 to the Internet Age. 1st ed. Cambridge: The MIT Press, 2022.

=== 2019 ===
- Langill, Caroline Seck. Carbon + Light: Juan Geuer’s luminous precision. Ottawa: Ottawa Art Gallery, 2019.
- Cumming, Laura. "24/7: A Wake-Up Call for our Non-Stop World Review – in search of lost time". The Guardian. 2019. Online publication. https://www.theguardian.com/artanddesign/2019/nov/10/24-7-a-wake-up-call-for-our-non-stop-world-review-comerset-house-london

=== 2018 ===
- McIver, Gillian. "'What does it mean to be humans?' Biotechnologies, Ethics and Art". The Art Traveller. 2018. Online publication.

=== 2016 ===
- El- Sheikh, Tammer. "The Body Which is not One: four artists' responses to the culture and experience of heart transplantation" Hybrid Bodies. Rethinking Heart Transplantation. Canada: Concordia University, 2016.

=== 2015 ===
- Bruneau, Jaclyn. "The Body's Freedom in Restriction" Canadian Art. 2015. Online publication.
- Tofts, Darren. "View in half or varying light: Joel Zika's neo-baroque aesthetics" Digital Light. Sean Cubitt, Daniel Palmer and Nathaniel Tkacz (eds). Open Humanities Press, 2015. 193-203

=== 2011 ===
- Cook, Sarah, & Diamond, Sara (eds). The Banff New Media Institute Dialogues: Euphoria and Dystopia. Banff: Banff Center Press, 2011. 490-97.
- Mura, Gianluca (ed.). "Case Study: Catherine Richards." Metaplasticity in Virtual Worlds: Aesthetics and Semantic Concepts. Igi Global, 2011. 61-63.

=== 2009 ===
- Dyson, Frances. "Enchanting data: body, voice and tone in affective computing." Emotion, Place and Culture. Liz Bondi, Laura Cameron, Joyce Davidson, Mick Smith (eds). Aldershot, Hants, UK: Ashgate Publishing Ltd., 2009. 247-266.
- Dyson, Frances. "Atmospheres". Sounding New Media: rhetorics of immersion and embodiment in the arts. California: UC Press, 2009. 1-246.
- Langill, Caroline. Shifting Polarities: Exemplary Works of Canadian Electronic Media Art Produced Between 1970 and 1991. Montreal, QC: La fondation Daniel Langlois, 2009.

=== 2005 ===
- Tuer, Dot. "The Heart of the Matter: the Mediation of Science in the Art of Catherine Richards." Mining the Media Archive. Essays on Art, technology, and cultural resistance. Canada: XYZ Books, 2005. 25-33.
- Sawchuck, Kim. "Charged Heart: The Electronic Art of Catherine Richards." Horizon 0.6. Banff New Media Institute, 2005.

=== 2003 ===
- Hayles, N. Katherine. "Supersensual Chaos and Catherine Richards' "Excitable Tissues"." Catherine Richards: Excitable Tissues, edited by Sylvie Fortin, The Ottawa Art Gallery, 2003, pp. 9–24.
- Morse, Margaret. "The Poetics of Interactivity." Women, Art & Technology. Judy Malloy (ed). Cambridge, MA: MIT Press, 2003. 17-31.
- Sawchuk, Kim. "Charged Heart: The Electronic Art of Catherine Richards." Horizon Zero. Issue 06. Banff New Media Institute, 2003.

=== 2001 ===
- Phelan, Peggy. Art and Feminism. Reckitt, Helena (ed). New York: Phaidon Press, 2001. 171-172, 292.

=== 1998 ===
- Sawchuk, Kim. "Catherine Richards." Parachute: Contemporary Art Magazine. 89, Jan/Feb/March (1998): 49-50.

=== 1996 ===
- Dyson, Frances. "Charged Havens." World Art. March (1996): 42-47.
- Hayles, Katherine N. "Embodied Virtuality: Or How To Put Bodies Back in the Picture". Immersed In Technology: Art and Virtual Environments. Cambridge: MIT Press, 1996. 1-28.

=== 1995 ===
- Huhtamo, Erkki. "Excavation Area: A Virtual Gallery of Archaeological Art." InterCommunication. 14, Autumn (1995): 147.

== Selected awards, fellowships, residencies, and research-creation projects ==
Year	Event
1987	High End Computer Graphics and Grand Prize Computer Graphics prize, Video Culture International Festival
1990–1991	Artist in Residence, The BIOAPPARATUS. Visual Arts / Media Arts, Banff Centre for the Arts
1990	Ontario Arts Council Electronic Media Art Grant, Principal Investigator
1990	Canada Council for the Arts New Media and Audio Artists Grant, Principal Investigator
1991	Artist in Residence, Media Arts, Banff Centre for the Arts
1991	Canada Council for the Arts New Media and Audio Artists Grant, Principal Investigator
1992	Canadian Conference of the Arts Corel Prize for innovative projects in arts and new technologies
1993	Ontario Arts Council Electronic Media Art Grant, Principal Investigator
1993	Canada Council for the Arts, Petro-Canada Media Biennial Arts award for outstanding and innovative use of new technologies in media arts
1993	Fellowship in Contemporary Canadian Art, Canadian Centre for the Visual Arts, National Gallery of Canada
1994	Prix ARS Electronica, Interactive Art, Honourable Mention, Linz Austria
1994	The Claudia De Hueck Fellowship in Art and Technology, Canadian Centre for the Visual Arts, National Gallery of Canada
1995	Ontario Arts Council Electronic Media Art Grant, Principal Investigator
1995	Canada Council for the Arts Computer Integrated Media Art Grant, Principal Investigator
1996–1997	Artist in Residence, Media Art, National Gallery of Canada
1997	AT&T Foundation Research and Production Grant, Principal Investigator
1998	Canada Council for the Arts New Media and Audio Artists Grant, Principal Investigator
1999	DAÏMON Centre Grant to Media Arts Production Organizations, Department of Visual Arts University of Ottawa
1999	Langlois Foundation for the Arts, Science and Technology Research and Production Grant
1999	Canada Council for the Arts, Millennium Arts Fund, Principal Investigator
2000	Artist in Residence, National Research Council of Canada, Principal Investigator, New Media and Audio Artists
2001	Artist in Residence, National Research Council of Canada, Principal Investigator, In-kind funding
2002–2005	Artist in Residence for Research Fellowship (AIRes), The Canada Council for the Arts / National Research Council of Canada
2004	Canada Council for the Arts with the Saidye Bronfman Centre, Media Arts production grant
2004	Canada Council for the Arts with the Saidye Bronfman Centre, Visual Arts production grant
2004	Banff New Media Residency, rapid prototyping
2006	Canada Council for the Arts New Media and Audio Production Grant, "Excruciatingly Slow, Exceedingly Fast"
2006	Individual Fellow Award, World Technology Network
2008–2013	Research-Creation, PITH, "Hybrid Bodies" SSHRC Project, Toronto
2009	Canadian Foundation for Innovation co-investigator, high resolution still, moving and stereo image capture, IMG lab
2009–2019	University Research Chair, University of Ottawa
2011–2013	Research-Creation, SSHRC Research and Creation in Fine Arts Grant, Principal Investigator, "Hybrid Bodies"
2011–2013	Research-Creation, SSHRC Research and Creation in Fine Arts Grant, Principal Investigator, "Shivering"
2012–2013	Research-Creation, "Hybrid Bodies" SSHRC Project, Toronto and Montreal
2012–2014	GRAND (Graphics, Animation and New Media), Investigator, 3D Stereo Imaging, "MOTIVA"
2016–2026	Research-Creation, SSHRC Insight Grant, Principal Investigator, "ObjectACTS"
2002–present	Academician, Royal Canadian Academy of Arts
