= Scott Bemand =

English rugby union player

- Born: Scott Bemand; 21 September 1978 (age 48) Hereford, England
- Height: 5 ft 11 in (1.80 m)
- Weight: 13 st 10 lb (87 kg)
- School: Bishop of Hereford's Bluecoat School
- University: Harper Adams University College

Rugby union career
- Position: Scrum-half
- Current team: Dorchester
Youth career
- Luctonians
Senior career
Years	Team	Apps	(Points)
1998–2001	Moseley		
2001–2004	NEC Harlequins		
2004–2007	Leicester	53	(25)
2008–2010	Bath	40	(0)
Coaching career
- Years: Team
- 2023–: Ireland women (Head Coach)

Scott Bemand (born 21 September 1978 in Hereford) is a retired English rugby union player and current rugby coach. He formerly played for Harlequins, Leicester Tigers and Bath.

From a farming family in Herefordshire, Bemand played youth rugby with Luctonians prior to spending four years with Moseley. After Moseley went into administration, Bemand moved to Harlequins in 2001, where he worked with the former England scrum-half Richard Hill. In his final season with the club, Bemand won the European Challenge Cup.

He was a member of the senior England squad that toured Australia in 2006.

Bemand played for three seasons at Leicester Tigers before injury forced him out of the team at the end of the 2006–7 season. After a year blighted by injury, he signed to play for Bath Rugby from the 2008/9 season.

Further injury forced his retirement at the end of the 2009–10 season.

Bemand coached at Dorchester RFC within the senior squad on a weekly basis until 21 May 2015 when he was announced as the new England Women's team attack coach. He completed his last game with the team in front of over 58000 people as England won another 6 Nations grand slam on 29 April 2023.

On 27 July 2023, the Irish Rugby Football Union (IRFU) announced the appointment of Bemand as head coach of their women's team on a 3-year contract.
