= Léa Champon =

French rugby union player (born 2003)

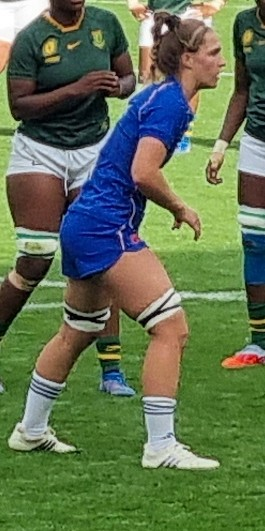
- Champon during the 2025 Rugby World Cup in Northampton.
- Born: 25 February 2003 (age 23)
- Height: 177 cm (5 ft 10 in)

Rugby union career
- Position: Flanker
Senior career
Years	Team	Apps	(Points)
2020–Present	FC Grenoble Amazones	13	(5)
International career
Years	Team	Apps	(Points)
2023–Present	France	15	(10)

Léa Champon (born 25 February 2003) is a French international rugby union player who plays for FC Grenoble Amazones in the French Élite 1 league.

== Early life and education ==
Léa Champon grew up in Chasselay, in the Isère department of France. She began playing rugby at the age of seven with US Vinay, then joined Saint-Marcellin in 2014. In 2018, she moved to FC Grenoble Amazones. Alongside her rugby development, Champon began studying for a degree in STAPS (Sciences and Techniques of Physical and Sports Activities) at the University of Grenoble. Then, she pursued a master's degree in Economic Strategy for Sport, Tourism and Events.

== Rugby career ==
=== Club career ===
==== FC Grenoble Amazones ====
Champon has played with the FC Grenoble Amazones in the Elite 1, the top division of French women's rugby, since the 2020–21 season.

=== International career ===
Champon represented France at the under-20 level in 2022, including a match against England.

In 2023, she earned her first senior call-up for the Women's Six Nations Championship. Later that year she earned her first senior cap as a substitute in France's historic 18–17 win over New Zealand during the WXV 1 tournament. A week later, on 28 October 2023, she was named in the starting XV for the first time in France's match against Australia, playing in the back row alongside Gaëlle Hermet and Charlotte Escudero.

In 2025, she returned to the national squad for the 2025 Women's Six Nations Championship, where she scored a try in France's win over Wales. On 2 August 2025, she was selected in the French side to the Women's Rugby World Cup in England.
