= Alissa Ranuccini =

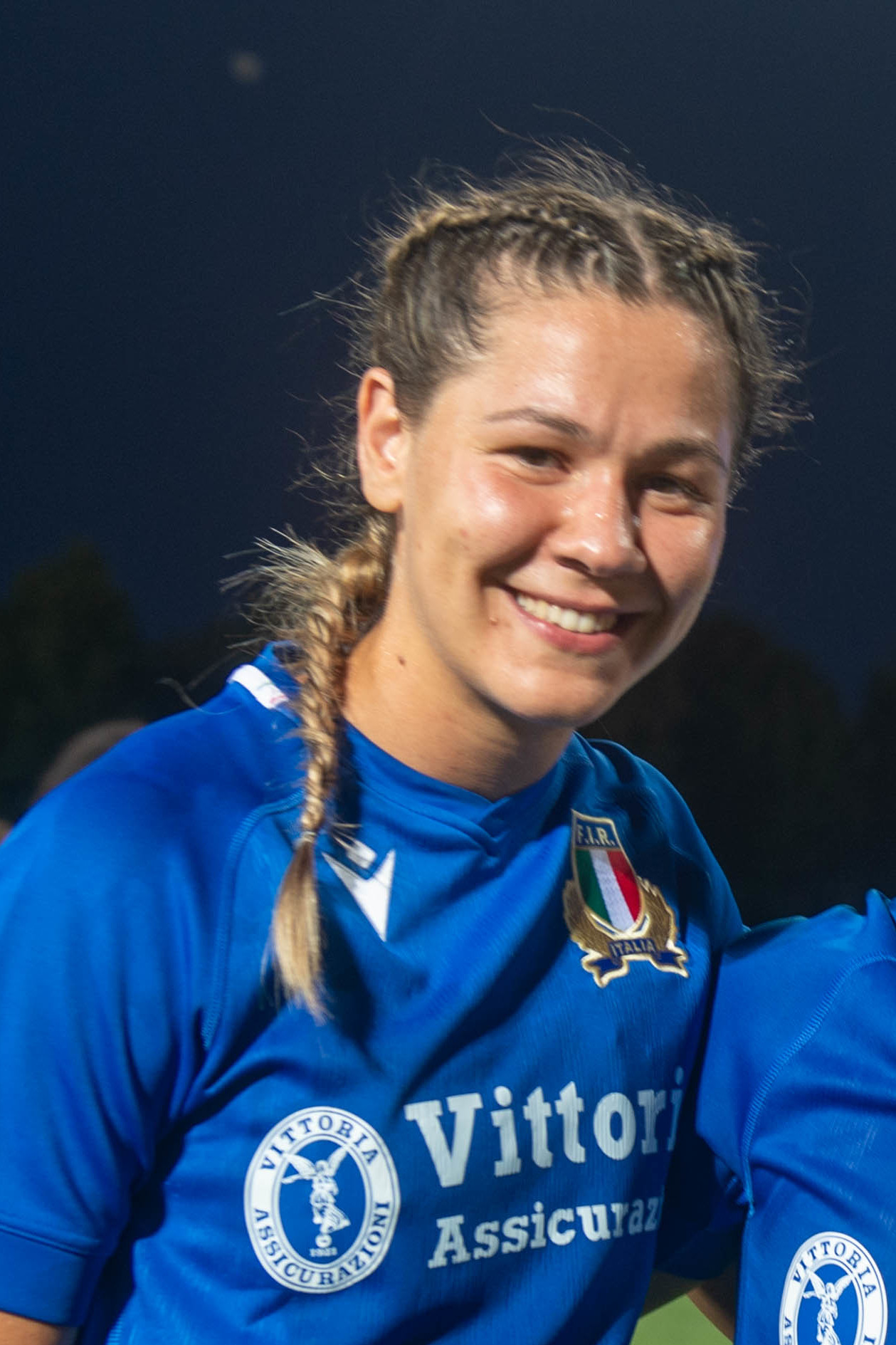
- Ranuccini in July 2023 in Parma after a test match against Spain
- Born: 28 June 2000 (age 26) Pavullo nel Frignano
- Height: 180 cm (5 ft 11 in)
- Weight: 73 kg (161 lb; 11 st 7 lb)
- University: University of Parma
- Occupation(s): Rugby union player Biotechnology student

Rugby union career
- Position: flanker
- Current team: Colorno Women
Youth career
- 2013–2014: Formigine Women
- 2014–2015: CUS Ferrara Women
- 2016–2017: Colorno Women
Senior career
Years	Team	Apps	(Points)
2017–	Colorno Women		(0)
- Correct as of 3 November 2023
International career
Years	Team	Apps	(Points)
2023–	Italy	18	(5)
- Correct as of 24 September 2025

Alissa Ranuccini (Italian pronunciation: [ranutˈtʃiːni]; born 28 June 2000) is an Italian international rugby union player who plays as flanker for the women's team of Rugby Colorno. Since 2023, she also represents Italy at senior level.

== Early life and career ==
Ranuccini was born in Pavullo nel Frignano, a town in Emilia-Romagna. Formerly an artistic gymnast, having grown too tall for the sport around age 13, she switched to rugby union and started attending Formigine Highlanders, the same club where her older brother used to play. She then moved to the girls' youth squad of CUS Ferrara Rugby then, after one year of hiatus due to a knee injury, was admitted to Colorno Women's academy in 2017. During her time there she was capped by the Italian U-18 national team.

== Rugby career ==
=== Club ===
Ranuccini debuted in 2017–18 in Colorno's first squad and won the Italian championship beating the incumbent holder Valsugana 29–20 in the grand final in Calvisano that same year. Ranuccini contributed to the final success with a try in the semi-final against Villorba.

=== International ===
Though part of the national team since 2022, she didn't play in the Women's World Cup 2021 (played in October 2022). She was called up to the squad by head coach Raineri for the 2023 Six Nations, during which she debuted in Parma against Ireland (win 24–7).

Ranuccini scored her first international try in Cape Town against South Africa during the 2023 WXV 2. She was named in Italy's squad for the 2025 Women's Six Nations Championship.

On 11 August 2025, she was named in the Italian side to the Women's Rugby World Cup in England.

== Personal life ==
Ranuccini graduated in biotechnologies from the University of Parma.

== Honours ==
- Italian championship (1)
  Winner: 2017–18
