= Carla Arbez =

France international rugby union player

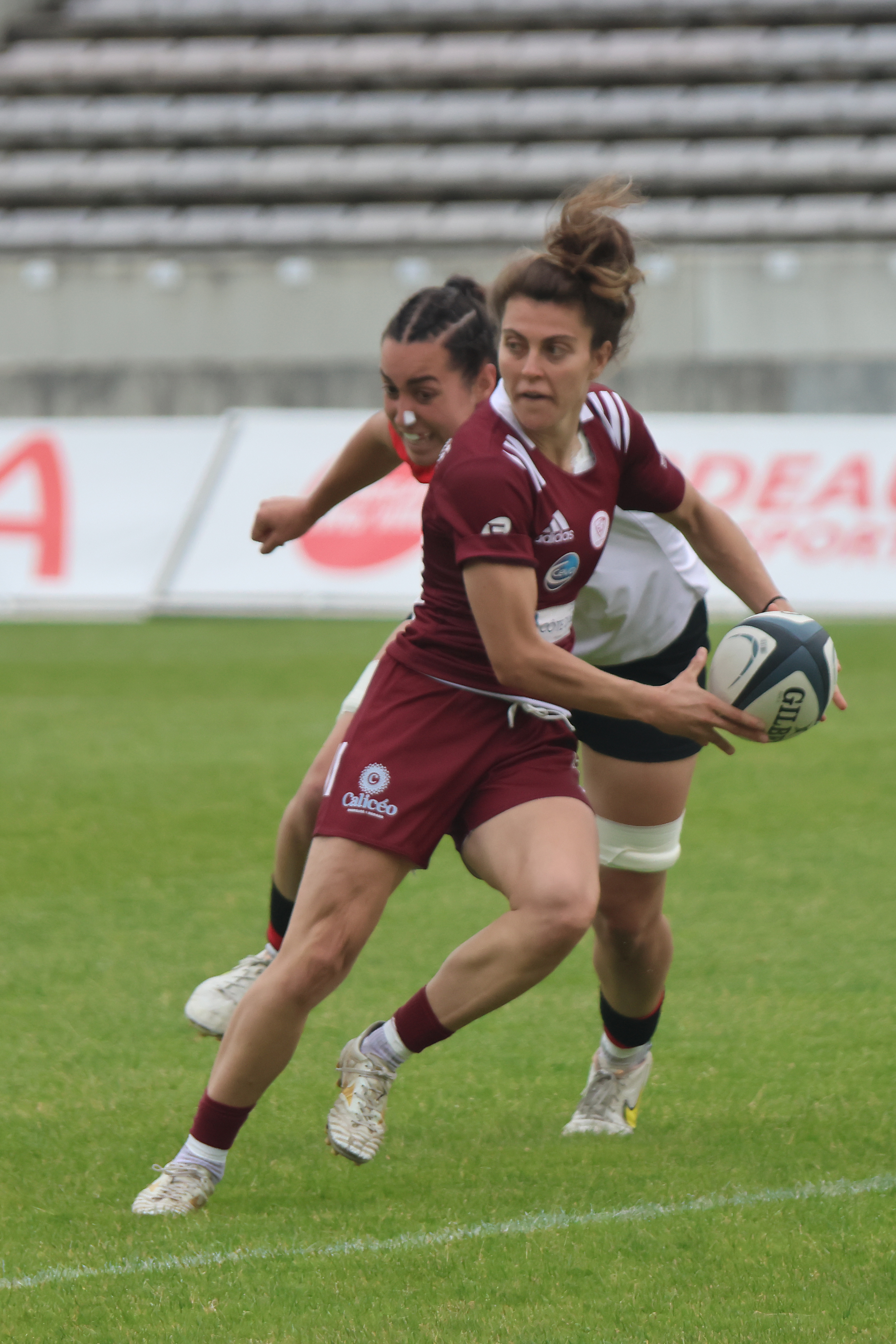
- Arbez with Stade Bordelais in 2023
- Born: 24 May 1998 (age 28) Biarritz, France
- Height: 173 cm (5 ft 8 in)

Rugby union career
- Position: Fly-half
Senior career
Years	Team	Apps	(Points)
2021	Stade Bordelais		(0)
International career
Years	Team	Apps	(Points)
2023–	France	16	(21)

Carla Arbez (born 24 May 1999) is a French rugby union player, playing as a fly-half for the French national team and Stade Bordelais.

== Early life and education ==
Arbez began playing rugby at the age of seven in her hometown of Oléron, where she joined the Oléron Rugby Club. She later moved to Stade Rochelais from 2012 to 2014 before joining Stade Bordelais in 2014. Arbez pursued academic studies in Sports Science (STAPS) and graduated with a master's degree in Physical and Mental Preparation in 2022. She works as a sports educator at Stade Bordelais Omnisports.

== Club career ==
=== AS Bayonne (2018-2021) ===
In 2018, she joined the Bayonne rugby club, playing in the Elite 2 division.

=== Stade Bordelais (2021-present) ===
In 2021, Arbez joined Stade Bordelais, where she quickly established herself as a key playmaker and starting fly-half. She helped guide the team to back-to-back French championship titles in 2023 and 2024. During the 2024–25 season, Bordeaux remained unbeaten under her leadership at fly-half, winning their first 14 matches of the campaign.

== International career ==
Arbez has represented France at various youth levels, winning the European U18 Sevens Championship in 2016 and securing third place in 2017. In 2023, she earned her first call-up to the French Women's National Rugby Team for the 2023 Women's Six Nations Championship, making her debut against Italy on 26 March 2023 and scored a try in her debut match. However, after participating in the 2023 WXV tournament in New Zealand, she was left out of the national squad throughout 2024, with players such as Lina Queyroi and Lina Tuy preferred in her position.

=== 2025 Women's Six Nations Championship ===
In March 2025, after a year and a half without a call-up, Arbez made her return as the starting fly-half for France in the opening match of the 2025 Women's Six Nations against Ireland. She continued as starting fly-half in the second match against Scotland.

On 2 August 2025, she was selected in the French side to the Women's Rugby World Cup in England.

== Personal life ==
Arbez's partner is Sarah-Maud Lachance, who is also a rugby player.

== Honours ==
=== Stade Bordelais ===
- French Championship (Élite 1): 2023, 2024.
