= Feleu =

Feleu is a surname. Notable people with the surname include:

- Manaé Feleu (born 2000), French rugby union player, plays for Grenoble and France, sister of Teani
- Teani Feleu (born 2002), French rugby union player, plays for Grenoble and France, sister of Manaé
