= Dorothy Wall (rugby union) =

Ireland international rugby union player

- Born: 4 May 2000 (age 26) Tipperary, Ireland
- Height: 175 cm (5 ft 9 in)
- Weight: 87 kg (192 lb)

Rugby union career
- Position: Flanker
Amateur team(s)
Years	Team	Apps	(Points)
	Fethard & District RFC		(0)
Senior career
Years	Team	Apps	(Points)
	Blackrock College RFC		(0)
	Exeter Chiefs		(0)
International career
Years	Team	Apps	(Points)
2018–present	Ireland	32	(10)
National sevens team
Years	Team		Comps
2019	Ireland 7s		

Dorothy Wall (born 4 May 2000) is an Irish rugby union player from Fethard, County Tipperary. She plays flanker for Blackrock College RFC, Munster and Ireland women's national rugby union team. She is also contracted to Rugby Ireland's international Sevens team. She is a radiography student, based in Dublin.

== Club career ==
Wall played basketball in her youth and did not take up rugby until she was in her mid-teens. When she was in Transition Year in Presentation Secondary School, Thurles Polly Murphy encouraged her to join her local club Fethard RFC.

She played Under-16 and Under-18 for Fethard which led to a call-up for Munster at Under-18 level where she was initially selected on the wing and played alongside Enya Breen and Emily Lane.

When she moved to Dublin to study in 2019–2020 she joined Blackrock College RFC who play in the Energia All-Ireland League. In July 2024, she joined Exeter Chiefs Women.

== International career ==
Wall first played for Ireland in underage Sevens rugby and won the UK Schools Sevens with Ireland's Under-18 team in 2017. After completing her Leaving Certificate she was selected for the Irish senior Sevens squad. She won her first senior Ireland Sevens cap in the Rugby Europe Women's Sevens Grand Prix Series leg in Ukraine in the summer of 2019.

Wall was first called up to the Irish XV squad in October 2019.

She made her Irish XV debut, as a replacement, against Scotland in the 2020 Women's Six Nations and also came off the bench against Wales and England. She got her first start against Italy (rescheduled to October due to COVID-19 pandemic), starting at blindside when Ciara Griffin who was switched to Number 8.

In the 2021 Women's Six Nations she scored her first international try versus Wales and also started against France.

In 2021 Wall also played Sevens for Ireland and said she will continue juggling both codes. She was named in Ireland's XVs side for the 2025 Six Nations Championship in March.

== Personal life ==
Wall was a talented basketball player in her youth when she was on Irish development squad in the Midlands and she also rides horses. She has three brothers who all play rugby.

During the COVID-19 pandemic of 2020-2021 the UCD radiography student was on a work placement in St Vincent's University Hospital, working on the medical frontline.
