= 2025 Women's Six Nations Championship =

Women's rugby union competition

- Date: 22 March – 27 April 2025
- Countries: England; France; Ireland; Italy; Scotland; Wales

Tournament statistics
- Champions: England (21st title)
- Grand Slam: England (19th title)
- Triple Crown: England (25th title)
- Matches played: 15
- Attendance: 151,496 (10,100 per match)
- Tries scored: 126 (8.4 per match)
- Top point scorer: (France) Morgane Bourgeois (73)
- Top try scorer: (England) Abby Dow (6)
- Player of the tournament: (Ireland) Aoife Wafer
- Official website: Official website

The 2025 Women's Six Nations Championship (known as the Guinness Women's Six Nations for sponsorship purposes, except in France, and branded as W6N) was the 24th Women's Six Nations Championship, an annual rugby union competition featuring the women's national teams of England, France, Ireland, Italy, Scotland and Wales. It began on 22 March and ended on 27 April 2025, with England winning the title with a final-day victory by a single point over France.

== Participants ==
Nation	Stadium			Coach	Captain	World Rugby Ranking	
Nation	Home stadium	Capacity	Location	Coach	Captain	Start (Note: As of 17 March 2025)	End (Note: As of 29 April 2025)
England	York Community Stadium	8,500	York	(New Zealand) John Mitchell	Zoe Aldcroft	1st	1st
England	Welford Road	25,849	Leicester	(New Zealand) John Mitchell	Zoe Aldcroft	1st	1st
England	Twickenham Stadium	82,000	London	(New Zealand) John Mitchell	Zoe Aldcroft	1st	1st
France	Stade Marcel-Deflandre	16,700	La Rochelle	(France) Gaëlle Mignot (France) David Ortiz	Manaé Feleu	4th	4th
France	Stade Amédée-Domenech	13,979	Brive-la-Gaillarde	(France) Gaëlle Mignot (France) David Ortiz	Manaé Feleu	4th	4th
Ireland	Ravenhill Stadium	18,196	Belfast	(England) Scott Bemand	Edel McMahon	6th	5th
Ireland	Musgrave Park	8,008	Cork	(England) Scott Bemand	Edel McMahon	6th	5th
Italy	Stadio Sergio Lanfranchi	5,000	Parma	(Italy) Fabio Roselli	Elisa Giordano	8th	8th
Scotland	Edinburgh Rugby Stadium	7,800	Edinburgh	(Scotland) Bryan Easson	Rachel Malcolm	7th	7th
Wales	Millennium Stadium	73,931	Cardiff	(Wales) Sean Lynn	Hannah Jones	10th	10th
Wales	Rodney Parade	8,700	Newport	(Wales) Sean Lynn	Hannah Jones	10th	10th

== Table ==
Pos	Team	Pld	W	D	L	PF	PA	PD	TF	TA	GS	TB	LB	Pts	ENG	FRA	IRE	ITA	SCO	WAL
1	England	5	5	0	0	256	71	+185	40	11	3	5	0	28	—	43–42		38–5	59–7	
2	France	5	4	0	1	183	106	+77	24	15	0	4	1	21		—			38–15	42–12
3	Ireland	5	2	0	3	133	128	+5	21	18	0	2	1	11	5–49	15–27	—			
4	Italy	5	2	0	3	107	155	−48	17	24	0	2	0	10		21–34	12–54	—		44–12
5	Scotland	5	2	0	3	89	162	−73	13	24	0	1	0	9			26–19	17–25	—	24–21
6	Wales	5	0	0	5	71	217	−146	11	32	0	0	1	1	12–67		14–40			—

Source: Women's Six Nations
Legend: Blue = home team win; Yellow = draw; Red = away team win.

Table ranking rules

- Four points are awarded for a win.
- Two points are awarded for a draw.
- A bonus point is awarded to a team that scores four or more tries, or loses by seven points or fewer.
- Three bonus points are awarded to a team that wins all five of their matches (a Grand Slam). This ensures that a Grand Slam winning team would top the table with at least 23 points, as another team could lose one match while winning two bonus points and win the other four matches while winning four bonus points for a maximum of 22 points.
- Tiebreakers
  - If two or more teams are tied on table points, the team with the better points difference (points scored against points conceded) is ranked higher.
  - If the above tiebreaker fails to separate tied teams, the team that scores the higher number of total tries (including penalty tries) in their matches is ranked higher.
  - If two or more teams remain tied after applying the above tiebreakers then those teams will be placed at equal rank; if the tournament has concluded and more than one team is placed first then the title will be shared between them.

== Fixtures ==
=== Round 1 ===
22 March 2025
13:00 GMT (UTC+0)

Ireland	15–27	France
Try: Wafer (2) 21' m, 66' m Jones 45' m	Report	Try: Vernier 6' c Menager 17' c Boulard 73' c Con: Bourgeois (3/3) 7', 18', 74'; Pen: Bourgeois (2/2) 32', 71'

Ravenhill Stadium, Belfast
Attendance: 6,976
Referee: Hollie Davidson (Scotland)

FB	15	Stacey Flood
RW	14	Anna McGann
OC	13	Aoife Dalton
IC	12	Eve Higgins	(substituted off) 44'	(substituted on) 51'	(substituted off) 67'
LW	11	Amee-Leigh Costigan (c)
FH	10	Dannah O'Brien
SH	9	Emily Lane	(substituted off) 55'
N8	8	Aoife Wafer
OF	7	Erin King
BF	6	Brittany Hogan	(substituted off) 55'
RL	5	Dorothy Wall	(substituted off) 55'
LL	4	Ruth Campbell	(substituted off) 67'
TP	3	Linda Djougang	(substituted off) 77'
HK	2	Neve Jones	(substituted off) 55'
LP	1	Niamh O'Dowd	(substituted off) 77'
Replacements:
HK	16	Cliodhna Moloney	(substituted on) 55'
PR	17	Siobhán McCarthy	(substituted on) 77'
PR	18	Christy Haney	(substituted on) 77'
FL	19	Grace Moore	(substituted on) 67'
LK	20	Fiona Tuite	(substituted on) 55'
FL	21	Edel McMahon	(substituted on) 55'
SH	22	Aoibheann Reilly	(substituted on) 55'
CE	23	Enya Breen	(substituted on) 44'	(substituted off) 51'	(substituted on) 67'
Coach:
(England) Scott Bemand

FB	15	Morgane Bourgeois
RW	14	Mélissande Llorens
OC	13	Nassira Konde		(substituted off) 33'
IC	12	Gabrielle Vernier	(red card) 44'	(substituted off) 65'
LW	11	Marine Ménager
FH	10	Carla Arbez		(substituted off) 69'
SH	9	Pauline Bourdon Sansus		(substituted off) 51'	(substituted on) 61'	(substituted off) 69'	(substituted on) 80'
N8	8	Teani Feleu
OF	7	Séraphine Okemba		(substituted off) 65'
BF	6	Charlotte Escudero
RL	5	Madoussou Fall
LL	4	Manaé Feleu (c)
TP	3	Rose Bernadou		(substituted off) 55'
HK	2	Agathe Sochat		(substituted off) 55'
LP	1	Yllana Brosseau		(substituted off) 55'
Replacements:
HK	16	Manon Bigot		(substituted on) 55'
PR	17	Ambre Mwayembe		(substituted on) 55'
PR	18	Clara Joyeux		(substituted on) 55'
FL	19	Axelle Berthoumieu		(substituted on) 65'
FL	20	Léa Champon		(substituted on) 65'
SH	21	Alexandra Chambon		(substituted on) 51'	(substituted off) 61'	(substituted on) 69'	(substituted off) 80'
CE	22	Lina Queyroi		(substituted on) 69'
FB	23	Émilie Boulard		(substituted on) 33'
Coach:
(France) Gaëlle Mignot & (France) David Ortiz

Player of the Match:
Teani Feleu (France)

Assistant referees:
Holly Wood (England)
Amelia Luciano (United States)
Television match official:
Rachel Horton (Australia)
Foul play review officer:
Quinton Immelman (South Africa)

22 March 2025
16:45 GMT (UTC+0)

Scotland	24–21	Wales (1 BP)
Try: Bonar 35' c Orr 43' c Bartlett 64' c Con: Nelson (3/3) 36', 44', 65'; Pen: Nelson (1/1) 16'	Report	Try: Phillips 4' c Fleming 52' c G. Pyrs 73' c Con: Bevan (3/3) 5', 53', 74'

Edinburgh Rugby Stadium, Edinburgh
Attendance: 4,234
Referee: Kat Roche (United States)

FB	15	Chloe Rollie
RW	14	Rhona Lloyd
OC	13	Emma Orr
IC	12	Lisa Thomson
LW	11	Francesca McGhie
FH	10	Helen Nelson
SH	9	Leia Brebner-Holden		(substituted off) 47'
N8	8	Evie Gallagher	(red card) 51'	(substituted off) 71'
OF	7	Rachel McLachlan		(substituted off) 52'
BF	6	Rachel Malcolm (c)
RL	5	Sarah Bonar
LL	4	Hollie Cunningham		(substituted off) 75'
TP	3	Elliann Clarke		(substituted off) 52'
HK	2	Lana Skeldon		(substituted off) 52'
LP	1	Anne Young		(substituted off) 52'
Replacements:
HK	16	Elis Martin		(substituted on) 52'
PR	17	Leah Bartlett		(substituted on) 52'
PR	18	Christine Belisle		(substituted on) 52'
LK	19	Adelle Ferrie		(substituted on) 75'
FL	20	Alex Stewart		(substituted on) 71'
N8	21	Jade Konkel-Roberts		(substituted on) 52'
SH	22	Caity Mattinson		(substituted on) 47'
CE	23	Evie Wills
Coach:
(Scotland) Bryan Easson

FB	15	Jasmine Joyce-Butchers
RW	14	Lisa Neumann
OC	13	Hannah Jones (c)			(substituted off) 69'
IC	12	Kayleigh Powell
LW	11	Carys Cox			(substituted off) 73'
FH	10	Lleucu George
SH	9	Keira Bevan
N8	8	Georgia Evans	(yellow card) 36'	(red card) 48'	(substituted off) 69'
OF	7	Bethan Lewis
BF	6	Kate Williams
RL	5	Alaw Pyrs			(substituted off) 61'
LL	4	Abbie Fleming
TP	3	Jenni Scoble			(substituted off) 40'
HK	2	Carys Phillips			(substituted off) 50'
LP	1	Maisie Davies			(substituted off) 50'
Replacements:
HK	16	Kelsey Jones			(substituted on) 50'
PR	17	Gwenllian Pyrs			(substituted on) 50'
PR	18	Donna Rose			(substituted on) 40'
LK	19	Gwen Crabb			(substituted on) 69'
FL	20	Bryonie King			(substituted on) 61'
SH	21	Megan Davies
WG	22	Courtney Keight			(substituted on) 69'
WG	23	Nel Metcalfe			(substituted on) 73'
Coach:
(Wales) Sean Lynn

Player of the Match:
Helen Nelson (Scotland)

Assistant referees:
Jess Ling (Australia)
Shanda Assmus (Canada)
Television match official:
Oli Kellett (Australia)
Foul play review officer:
Ian Tempest (England)

23 March 2025
15:00 GMT (UTC+0)

(1 BP) England	38–5	Italy
Try: Venner 3' c Scarratt 6' c Penalty try 21'; MacDonald 28' m Cokayne 37' c Sing 78' m Con: Sing (3/5) 4', 7', 38'	Report	Try: Sgorbini 34' m

York Community Stadium, York
Attendance: 8,381
Referee: Precious Pazani (Zimbabwe)

FB	15	Emma Sing
RW	14	Mia Venner	(substituted off) 66'
OC	13	Emily Scarratt
IC	12	Holly Aitchison
LW	11	Claudia MacDonald
FH	10	Helena Rowland	(substituted off) 60'
SH	9	Lucy Packer	(substituted off) 66'
N8	8	Maddie Feaunati
OF	7	Marlie Packer	(substituted off) 55'
BF	6	Zoe Aldcroft (c)
RL	5	Lilli Ives Campion
LL	4	Rosie Galligan	(substituted off) 60'
TP	3	Maud Muir	(substituted off) 51'
HK	2	Amy Cokayne	(substituted off) 60'
LP	1	Kelsey Clifford	(substituted off) 51'
Replacements:
HK	16	May Campbell	(substituted on) 60'
PR	17	Hannah Botterman	(substituted on) 51'
PR	18	Sarah Bern	(substituted on) 51'
LK	19	Abbie Ward	(substituted on) 60'
FL	20	Sadia Kabeya	(substituted on) 55'
SH	21	Flo Robinson	(substituted on) 66'
CE	22	Jade Shekells	(substituted on) 60'
FB	23	Ellie Kildunne	(substituted on) 66'
Coach:
(New Zealand) John Mitchell

FB	15	Vittoria Ostuni Minuzzi
RW	14	Aura Muzzo
OC	13	Alyssa D'Inca
IC	12	Beatrice Rigoni		(substituted off) 72'
LW	11	Francesca Granzotto		(substituted off) 23'	(substituted on) 32'
FH	10	Veronica Madia		(substituted off) 22'
SH	9	Sofia Stefan (c)		(substituted off) 64'
N8	8	Francesca Sgorbini
OF	7	Isabella Locatelli		(substituted off) 40'
BF	6	Beatrice Veronese		(substituted off) 55'
RL	5	Giordana Duca
LL	4	Valeria Fedrighi
TP	3	Sara Seye		(substituted off) 49'
HK	2	Laura Gurioli	(yellow card) 21'			(substituted off) 47'
LP	1	Silvia Turani		(substituted off) 64'
Replacements:
HK	16	Vittoria Vecchini		(substituted on) 23'	(substituted off) 32'	(substituted on) 47'
PR	17	Emanuela Stecca		(substituted on) 64'
PR	18	Gaia Maris		(substituted on) 49'
LK	19	Sara Tounesi		(substituted on) 40'
FL	20	Giada Franco		(substituted on) 55'
SH	21	Alia Bitonci		(substituted on) 64'
FH	22	Emma Stevanin		(substituted on) 22'
WG	23	Beatrice Capomaggi		(substituted on) 72'
Coach:
(Italy) Fabio Roselli

Player of the Match:
Maddie Feaunati (England)

Assistant referees:
Jess Ling (Australia)
Zoe Naude (South Africa)
Television match official:
Aaron Paterson (New Zealand)
Foul play review officer:
Leo Colgan (Ireland)

=== Round 2 ===
29 March 2025
14:00 CET (UTC+1)

(1 BP) France	38–15	Scotland
Try: Arbez 11' c T. Feleu 60' c Okemba 63' m Bourgeois 67' c Con: Bourgeois (3/4) 12', 61', 68'; Pen: Bourgeois (3/3) 8', 24', 44'; Drop: Sansus (1/1) 50'	Report	Try: Orr 37' c Martin 80+1' m Con: Nelson (1/2) 38'; Pen: Nelson (1/1) 54'

Stade Marcel-Deflandre, La Rochelle
Attendance: 15,000
Referee: Lauren Jenner (Italy)

FB	15	Morgane Bourgeois
RW	14	Kelly Arbey
OC	13	Marine Ménager (cc)
IC	12	Montserrat Amédée
LW	11	Mélissande Llorens
FH	10	Carla Arbez	(substituted off) 59'
SH	9	Pauline Bourdon Sansus	(substituted off) 64'
N8	8	Teani Feleu
OF	7	Séraphine Okemba	(substituted off) 72'
BF	6	Charlotte Escudero	(substituted off) 58'
RL	5	Madoussou Fall
LL	4	Manaé Feleu (cc)	(substituted off) 66'
TP	3	Rose Bernadou	(substituted off) 51'
HK	2	Manon Bigot	(substituted off) 66'
LP	1	Yllana Brosseau	(substituted off) 51'
Replacements:
HK	16	Élisa Riffonneau	(substituted on) 66'
PR	17	Ambre Mwayembe	(substituted on) 51'
PR	18	Clara Joyeux	(substituted on) 51'
LK	19	Kiara Zago	(substituted on) 66'
FL	20	Axelle Berthoumieu	(substituted on) 58'
FL	21	Léa Champon	(substituted on) 72'
SH	22	Alexandra Chambon	(substituted on) 64'
CE	23	Lina Queyroi	(substituted on) 59'
Coach:
(France) Gaëlle Mignot & (France) David Ortiz

FB	15	Chloe Rollie
RW	14	Rhona Lloyd
OC	13	Emma Orr	(substituted off) 68'
IC	12	Lisa Thomson
LW	11	Francesca McGhie
FH	10	Helen Nelson
SH	9	Leia Brebner-Holden	(substituted off) 64'
N8	8	Jade Konkel-Roberts	(substituted off) 60'
OF	7	Rachel McLachlan
BF	6	Rachel Malcolm (c)
RL	5	Sarah Bonar
LL	4	Hollie Cunningham	(substituted off) 1'
TP	3	Elliann Clarke	(substituted off) 16'	(substituted on) 28'	(substituted off) 77'
HK	2	Lana Skeldon	(substituted off) 68'
LP	1	Anne Young	(substituted off) 60'
Replacements:
HK	16	Elis Martin	(substituted on) 68'
PR	17	Leah Bartlett	(substituted on) 60'
PR	18	Molly Poolman	(substituted on) 16'	(substituted off) 28'	(substituted on) 77'
LK	19	Adelle Ferrie	(substituted on) 1'	(substituted off) 68'
FL	20	Becky Boyd		(substituted on) 68'
FL	21	Alex Stewart	(substituted on) 60'
SH	22	Caity Mattinson	(substituted on) 64'
CE	23	Evie Wills	(substituted on) 68'
Coach:
(Scotland) Bryan Easson

Player of the Match:
Manaé Feleu (France)

Assistant referees:
Kat Roche (United States)
Amelia Luciano (United States)
Television match official:
Quinton Immelman (South Africa)
Foul play review officer:
Dan Jones (England)

29 March 2025
16:45 GMT (UTC+0)

Wales	12–67	England (1 BP)
Try: Scoble 5' c Williams 58' m Con: Bevan (1/2) 6'	Report	Try: Feaunati (2) 10' c, 26' m M. Jones 12' c Bern 18' c Kildunne (3) 47' c, 53' m, 55' m Dow (2) 67' m, 76' m Burton (2) 72' c, 80' c Con: Harrison (6/11) 11', 13', 19', 48', 73', 80+1'

Millennium Stadium, Cardiff
Attendance: 21,186
Referee: Clara Munarini (Italy)

FB	15	Jasmine Joyce-Butchers	(substituted off) 48'
RW	14	Lisa Neumann
OC	13	Hannah Jones (c)
IC	12	Kayleigh Powell
LW	11	Carys Cox
FH	10	Lleucu George	(substituted off) 56'
SH	9	Keira Bevan	(substituted off) 68'
N8	8	Georgia Evans
OF	7	Bethan Lewis
BF	6	Kate Williams
RL	5	Gwen Crabb	(substituted off) 57'
LL	4	Abbie Fleming	(substituted off) 52'
TP	3	Jenni Scoble	(substituted off) 40'
HK	2	Carys Phillips	(substituted off) 40'
LP	1	Gwenllian Pyrs	(substituted off) 52'
Replacements:
HK	16	Kelsey Jones	(substituted on) 40'
PR	17	Maisie Davies	(substituted on) 52'
PR	18	Donna Rose	(substituted on) 40'
LK	19	Alaw Pyrs	(substituted on) 52'
FL	20	Bryonie King	(substituted on) 57'
SH	21	Megan Davies	(substituted on) 68'
WG	22	Courtney Keight	(substituted on) 56'
WG	23	Nel Metcalfe	(substituted on) 48'
Coach:
(Wales) Sean Lynn

FB	15	Ellie Kildunne	(substituted off) 70'
RW	14	Abby Dow
OC	13	Megan Jones
IC	12	Tatyana Heard	(substituted off) 66'
LW	11	Jess Breach
FH	10	Zoe Harrison
SH	9	Natasha Hunt	(substituted off) 59'
N8	8	Maddie Feaunati	(substituted off) 66'
OF	7	Sadia Kabeya
BF	6	Zoe Aldcroft (c)
RL	5	Abbie Ward
LL	4	Morwenna Talling	(substituted off) 66'
TP	3	Sarah Bern	(substituted off) 52'
HK	2	Lark Atkin-Davies	(substituted off) 52'
LP	1	Mackenzie Carson	(substituted off) 25'
Replacements:
HK	16	Amy Cokayne	(substituted on) 52'
PR	17	Hannah Botterman	(substituted on) 25'
PR	18	Maud Muir	(substituted on) 52'
LK	19	Rosie Galligan	(substituted on) 66'
FL	20	Abi Burton	(substituted on) 66'
SH	21	Lucy Packer	(substituted on) 59'
FH	22	Holly Aitchison	(substituted on) 66'
CE	23	Helena Rowland	(substituted on) 70'
Coach:
(New Zealand) John Mitchell

Player of the Match:
Ellie Kildunne (England)

Assistant referees:
Aurélie Groizeleau (France)
Maria Heitor (Portugal)
Television match official:
Oli Kellett (Australia)
Foul play review officer:
Matteo Liperini (Italy)

30 March 2025
16:00 CEST (UTC+2)

Italy	12–54	Ireland (1 BP)
Try: Stefan 13' m Rigoni 66' c Con: Rigoni (1/2) 67'	Report	Try: Dalton 1' c McGann (3) 7' c, 24' c, 80+1' c Costigan 19' c Djougang 53' c Wall 64' m Hogan 78' c Con: O'Brien (7/8) 2', 8', 20', 25', 54', 79', 80+2'

Stadio Sergio Lanfranchi, Parma
Attendance: 3,337
Referee: Ella Goldsmith (Australia)

FB	15	Francesca Granzotto
RW	14	Aura Muzzo		(substituted off) 20'	(substituted on) 29'
OC	13	Michela Sillari		(substituted off) 59'
IC	12	Beatrice Rigoni
LW	11	Alyssa D'Inca				(substituted off) 63'
FH	10	Emma Stevanin
SH	9	Sofia Stefan		(substituted off) 59'
N8	8	Elisa Giordano (c)
OF	7	Francesca Sgorbini		(substituted off) 55'
BF	6	Sara Tounesi
RL	5	Giordana Duca
LL	4	Valeria Fedrighi	(yellow card) 1'	(substituted off) 62'
TP	3	Gaia Maris		(substituted off) 42'
HK	2	Vittoria Vecchini		(substituted off) 58'
LP	1	Silvia Turani		(substituted off) 58'
Replacements:
HK	16	Laura Gurioli		(substituted on) 58'
PR	17	Vittoria Zanette		(substituted on) 58'
PR	18	Sara Seye		(substituted on) 42'
LK	19	Beatrice Veronese		(substituted on) 55'
FL	20	Alissa Ranuccini		(substituted on) 62'
SH	21	Alia Bitonci		(substituted on) 59'
FH	22	Sara Mannini		(substituted on) 59'
WG	23	Beatrice Capomaggi		(substituted on) 20'	(substituted off) 29'	(substituted on) 63'
Coach:
(Italy) Fabio Roselli

FB	15	Stacey Flood
RW	14	Anna McGann
OC	13	Aoife Dalton
IC	12	Eve Higgins		(substituted off) 58'
LW	11	Amee-Leigh Costigan
FH	10	Dannah O'Brien
SH	9	Aoibheann Reilly		(substituted off) 57'
N8	8	Aoife Wafer		(substituted off) 50'
OF	7	Erin King
BF	6	Edel McMahon (c)		(substituted off) 58'	(substituted on) 66'
RL	5	Fiona Tuite		(substituted off) 50'
LL	4	Ruth Campbell		(substituted off) 58'
TP	3	Linda Djougang	(yellow card) 56'		(substituted off) 66'
HK	2	Neve Jones		(substituted off) 61'
LP	1	Niamh O'Dowd		(substituted off) 57'
Replacements:
HK	16	Cliodhna Moloney		(substituted on) 61'
PR	17	Siobhán McCarthy		(substituted on) 57'
PR	18	Christy Haney		(substituted on) 58'
FL	19	Grace Moore		(substituted on) 58'
LK	20	Dorothy Wall		(substituted on) 50'
FL	21	Brittany Hogan		(substituted on) 50'
SH	22	Emily Lane		(substituted on) 57'
CE	23	Enya Breen		(substituted on) 58'
Coach:
(England) Scott Bemand

Player of the Match:
Aoife Dalton (Ireland)

Assistant referees:
Precious Pazani (Zimbabwe)
Shanda Assmus (Canada)
Television match official:
Aaron Paterson (New Zealand)
Foul play review officer:
Ian Tempest (England)

=== Round 3 ===
12 April 2025
13:45 CEST (UTC+2)

(1 BP) France	42–12	Wales
Try: Boulard (2) 4' c, 15' c Bigot 40' c M. Feleu 43' c Penalty try 66'; Champon 78' c Con: Bourgeois (5/5) 5', 16', 40+1', 44', 79'	Report	Try: Williams 9' m Crabb 22' c Con: Bevan (1/2) 23'

Stade Amédée-Domenech, Brive-la-Gaillarde
Attendance: 12,738
Referee: Holly Wood (England)

FB	15	Morgane Bourgeois
RW	14	Kelly Arbey
OC	13	Marine Ménager (cc)
IC	12	Montserrat Amédée	(substituted off) 60'
LW	11	Émilie Boulard
FH	10	Carla Arbez	(substituted off) 62'
SH	9	Pauline Bourdon Sansus	(substituted off) 66'
N8	8	Teani Feleu
OF	7	Séraphine Okemba	(substituted off) 66'
BF	6	Charlotte Escudero
RL	5	Madoussou Fall
LL	4	Manaé Feleu (cc)	(substituted off) 70'
TP	3	Rose Bernadou	(substituted off) 40'
HK	2	Manon Bigot	(substituted off) 57'
LP	1	Yllana Brosseau	(substituted off) 51'
Replacements:
HK	16	Élisa Riffonneau	(substituted on) 57'
PR	17	Ambre Mwayembe	(substituted on) 51'
PR	18	Assia Khalfaoui	(substituted on) 40'
LK	19	Kiara Zago	(substituted on) 70'
FL	20	Axelle Berthoumieu	(substituted on) 66'
FL	21	Léa Champon	(substituted on) 60'
SH	22	Oceane Bordes	(substituted on) 66'
CE	23	Lina Queyroi	(substituted on) 62'
Coach:
(France) Gaëlle Mignot & (France) David Ortiz

FB	15	Jasmine Joyce-Butchers		(substituted off) 66'
RW	14	Lisa Neumann			(substituted off) 67'	(substituted on) 79'
OC	13	Hannah Jones (c)
IC	12	Courtney Keight
LW	11	Carys Cox
FH	10	Kayleigh Powell		(substituted off) 51'	(substituted on) 62'
SH	9	Keira Bevan				(substituted off) 67'
N8	8	Georgia Evans
OF	7	Bethan Lewis		(substituted off) 63'
BF	6	Kate Williams
RL	5	Gwen Crabb		(substituted off) 44'
LL	4	Abbie Fleming
TP	3	Jenni Scoble		(substituted off) 44'
HK	2	Carys Phillips		(substituted off) 44'
LP	1	Gwenllian Pyrs		(substituted off) 60'	(substituted on) 67'	(substituted off) 79'
Replacements:
HK	16	Kelsey Jones		(substituted on) 44'
PR	17	Maisie Davies	(yellow card) 66'	(substituted on) 60'
PR	18	Donna Rose		(substituted on) 44'
LK	19	Natalia John		(substituted on) 44'	(substituted off) 60'
LK	20	Alaw Pyrs			(substituted on) 60'
FL	21	Bryonie King		(substituted on) 63'
SH	22	Sian Jones		(substituted on) 51'	(substituted off) 62'	(substituted on) 67'
WG	23	Nel Metcalfe		(substituted on) 66'
Coach:
(Wales) Sean Lynn

Player of the Match:
Manon Bigot (France)

Assistant referees:
Sara Cox (England)
Maria Heitor (Portugal)
Television match official:
Leo Colgan (Ireland)
Foul play review officer:
Rachel Horton (Australia)

12 April 2025
16:45 IST (UTC+1)

Ireland	5–49	England (1 BP)
Try: Costigan 24' m	Report	Try: Talling 34' c Harrison 48' c M. Jones 52' c Bern (2) 57' c, 66' c Kildunne 70' c Clifford 74' c Con: Harrison (6/6) 35', 49', 53', 58', 67', 71'; Aitchison (1/1) 75'

Musgrave Park, Cork
Attendance: 7,754
Referee: Aurélie Groizeleau (France)

FB	15	Stacey Flood
RW	14	Anna McGann		(substituted off) 58'
OC	13	Aoife Dalton
IC	12	Eve Higgins
LW	11	Amee-Leigh Costigan (c)
FH	10	Dannah O'Brien		(substituted off) 58'
SH	9	Aoibheann Reilly		(substituted off) 55'
N8	8	Aoife Wafer
OF	7	Erin King
BF	6	Brittany Hogan
RL	5	Dorothy Wall		(substituted off) 70'
LL	4	Fiona Tuite		(substituted off) 47'
TP	3	Linda Djougang		(substituted off) 70'
HK	2	Neve Jones		(substituted off) 58'
LP	1	Niamh O'Dowd	(yellow card) 44'	(substituted off) 55'	(substituted on) 66'
Replacements:
HK	16	Cliodhna Moloney		(substituted on) 58'
PR	17	Siobhán McCarthy		(substituted on) 47'	(substituted off) 66'
PR	18	Christy Haney		(substituted on) 70'
LK	19	Ruth Campbell		(substituted on) 70'
FL	20	Grace Moore		(substituted on) 55'
SH	21	Aoibheann Reilly		(substituted on) 55'
FH	22	Nicole Fowley		(substituted on) 58'
WG	23	Vicky Elmes Kinlan		(substituted on) 58'
Coach:
(England) Scott Bemand

FB	15	Ellie Kildunne
RW	14	Abby Dow
OC	13	Megan Jones
IC	12	Tatyana Heard	(substituted off) 60'
LW	11	Jess Breach	(substituted off) 66'
FH	10	Zoe Harrison
SH	9	Natasha Hunt	(substituted off) 52'
N8	8	Alex Matthews
OF	7	Sadia Kabeya	(substituted off) 60'
BF	6	Zoe Aldcroft (c)
RL	5	Abbie Ward
LL	4	Morwenna Talling	(substituted off) 60'
TP	3	Maud Muir	(substituted off) 52'
HK	2	Lark Atkin-Davies	(substituted off) 52'
LP	1	Hannah Botterman	(substituted off) 52'
Replacements:
HK	16	Amy Cokayne	(substituted on) 52'
PR	17	Kelsey Clifford	(substituted on) 52'
PR	18	Sarah Bern	(substituted on) 52'
LK	19	Rosie Galligan	(substituted on) 60'
FL	20	Maddie Feaunati	(substituted on) 60'
SH	21	Lucy Packer	(substituted on) 52'
FH	22	Holly Aitchison	(substituted on) 60'
CE	23	Helena Rowland	(substituted on) 66'
Coach:
(New Zealand) John Mitchell

Player of the Match:
Maud Muir (England)

Assistant referees:
Clara Munarini (Italy)
Amber Stamp-Dunstan (Wales)
Television match official:
Andrew McMenemy (Scotland)
Foul play review officer:
Matteo Liperini (Italy)

13 April 2025
15:00 BST (UTC+1)

Scotland	17–25	Italy (1 BP)
Try: Rollie 13' c Gallagher 44' m McGhie 73' m Con: Nelson (1/3) 14'	Report	Try: Sgorbini 23' m Muzzo (2) 29' m, 77' m Minuzzi 55' m D'Inca 65' m

Edinburgh Rugby Stadium, Edinburgh
Attendance: 5,029
Referee: Aimee Barrett-Theron (South Africa)

FB	15	Chloe Rollie
RW	14	Rhona Lloyd
OC	13	Emma Orr
IC	12	Lisa Thomson	(yellow card) 55'
LW	11	Francesca McGhie
FH	10	Helen Nelson
SH	9	Leia Brebner-Holden		(substituted off) 16'
N8	8	Evie Gallagher		(substituted off) 63'
OF	7	Rachel McLachlan		(substituted off) 69'
BF	6	Rachel Malcolm (c)		(substituted off) 74'
RL	5	Becky Boyd
LL	4	Sarah Bonar
TP	3	Elliann Clarke		(substituted off) 63'
HK	2	Lana Skeldon		(substituted off) 49'
LP	1	Anne Young		(substituted off) 49'
Replacements:
HK	16	Elis Martin		(substituted on) 49'
PR	17	Leah Bartlett		(substituted on) 49'
PR	18	Molly Poolman		(substituted on) 63'
LK	19	Adelle Ferrie		(substituted on) 74'
FL	20	Jade Konkel-Roberts		(substituted on) 63'
FL	21	Alex Stewart		(substituted on) 69'
SH	22	Caity Mattinson		(substituted on) 16'
FB	23	Lucia Scott
Coach:
(Scotland) Bryan Easson

FB	15	Vittoria Ostuni Minuzzi
RW	14	Aura Muzzo
OC	13	Michela Sillari	(substituted off) 56'
IC	12	Beatrice Rigoni
LW	11	Alyssa D'Inca
FH	10	Emma Stevanin	(substituted off) 69'
SH	9	Sofia Stefan	(substituted off) 78'
N8	8	Elisa Giordano (c)
OF	7	Beatrice Veronese	(substituted off) 66'
BF	6	Francesca Sgorbini
RL	5	Giordana Duca
LL	4	Sara Tounesi	(substituted off) 78'
TP	3	Sara Seye	(substituted off) 52'
HK	2	Vittoria Vecchini	(substituted off) 78'
LP	1	Silvia Turani	(substituted off) 78'
Replacements:
HK	16	Desiree Spinelli	(substituted on) 78'
PR	17	Emanuela Stecca	(substituted on) 78'
PR	18	Gaia Maris	(substituted on) 52'
LK	19	Valeria Fedrighi	(substituted on) 78'
FL	20	Alissa Ranuccini	(substituted on) 66'
SH	21	Alia Bitonci	(substituted on) 78'
FH	22	Veronica Madia	(substituted on) 69'
FH	23	Sara Mannini	(substituted on) 56'
Coach:
(Italy) Fabio Roselli

Player of the Match:
Aura Muzzo (Italy)

Assistant referees:
Maria Latos (Germany)
Zoe Naude (South Africa)
Television match official:
Rachel Horton (Australia)
Foul play review officer:
Dan Jones (England)

=== Round 4 ===
19 April 2025
14:00 CEST (UTC+2)

Italy	21–34	France (1 BP)
Try: Vecchini 17' c Muzzo 25' c Turani 38' c Con: Sillari (3/3) 18', 26', 40'	Report	Try: Grisez 1' c Bourgeois 28' m R. Ménager 53' c M. Ménager 77' c Chambon 79' m Con: Bourgeois (3/5) 2', 54', 78'; Pen: Bourgeois (1/1) 42'

Stadio Sergio Lanfranchi, Parma
Attendance: 1,916
Referee: Sara Cox (England)

FB	15	Vittoria Ostuni Minuzzi
RW	14	Aura Muzzo
OC	13	Michela Sillari	(substituted off) 78'
IC	12	Sara Mannini	(substituted off) 57'
LW	11	Alyssa D'Inca
FH	10	Veronica Madia
SH	9	Alia Bitonci	(substituted off) 57'
N8	8	Elisa Giordano (c)
OF	7	Alissa Ranuccini	(substituted off) 46'
BF	6	Beatrice Veronese
RL	5	Giordana Duca	(substituted off) 46'
LL	4	Valeria Fedrighi
TP	3	Sara Seye	(substituted off) 57'
HK	2	Vittoria Vecchini	(substituted off) 62'
LP	1	Silvia Turani	(substituted off) 74'
Replacements:
HK	16	Desiree Spinelli	(substituted on) 62'
PR	17	Emanuela Stecca	(substituted on) 74'
PR	18	Gaia Maris	(substituted on) 57'
LK	19	Sara Tounesi	(substituted on) 46'
FL	20	Francesca Sgorbini	(substituted on) 46'
SH	21	Sofia Stefan	(substituted on) 57'
FH	22	Beatrice Capomaggi	(substituted on) 78'
CE	23	Beatrice Rigoni	(substituted on) 57'
Coach:
(Italy) Fabio Roselli

FB	15	Morgane Bourgeois
RW	14	Joanna Grisez
OC	13	Marine Ménager (cc)
IC	12	Gabrielle Vernier
LW	11	Émilie Boulard
FH	10	Carla Arbez		(substituted off) 65'
SH	9	Pauline Bourdon Sansus		(substituted off) 59'
N8	8	Teani Feleu
OF	7	Séraphine Okemba		(substituted off) 62'
BF	6	Romane Ménager		(substituted off) 72'
RL	5	Madoussou Fall	(yellow card) 7'
LL	4	Manaé Feleu (cc)		(substituted off) 51'
TP	3	Assia Khalfaoui		(substituted off) 51'
HK	2	Manon Bigot		(substituted off) 51'
LP	1	Yllana Brosseau		(substituted off) 51'
Replacements:
HK	16	Élisa Riffonneau		(substituted on) 51'
PR	17	Ambre Mwayembe		(substituted on) 51'
PR	18	Clara Joyeux		(substituted on) 51'
LK	19	Charlotte Escudero		(substituted on) 51'
FL	20	Axelle Berthoumieu		(substituted on) 72'
FL	21	Léa Champon		(substituted on) 62'
SH	22	Alexandra Chambon		(substituted on) 59'
CE	23	Lina Queyroi		(substituted on) 65'
Coach:
(France) Gaëlle Mignot & (France) David Ortiz

Player of the Match:
Madoussou Fall (France)

Assistant referees:
Maria Latos (Germany)
Zoe Naude (South Africa)
Television match official:
Dan Jones (England)
Foul play review officer:
Rachel Horton (Australia)

19 April 2025
16:45 BST (UTC+1)

(1 BP) England	59–7	Scotland
Try: Clifford 5' c Packer 16' c Aldcroft 20' c MacDonald (2) 26' c, 49' c Ward 33' c Atkin-Davies 40' c Dow (2) 73' m, 78' m Con: Aitchison (7/9) 6', 17', 21', 27', 34', 40+1', 50'	Report	Try: Thomson 57' c Con: Nelson (1/1) 58'

Welford Road, Leicester
Attendance: 15,530
Referee: Clara Munarini (Italy)

FB	15	Ellie Kildunne
RW	14	Abby Dow
OC	13	Megan Jones	(substituted off) 62'
IC	12	Jade Shekells	(substituted off) 58'
LW	11	Claudia MacDonald
FH	10	Holly Aitchison
SH	9	Lucy Packer	(substituted off) 58'
N8	8	Maddie Feaunati	(substituted off) 58'
OF	7	Marlie Packer
BF	6	Zoe Aldcroft (c)	(substituted off) 55'
RL	5	Abbie Ward
LL	4	Rosie Galligan
TP	3	Sarah Bern	(substituted off) 51'
HK	2	Lark Atkin-Davies	(substituted off) 51'
LP	1	Kelsey Clifford	(substituted off) 51'
Replacements:
HK	16	May Campbell	(substituted on) 51'
PR	17	Hannah Botterman	(substituted on) 51'
PR	18	Maud Muir	(substituted on) 51'
LK	19	Morwenna Talling	(substituted on) 55'
FL	20	Alex Matthews	(substituted on) 58'
SH	21	Natasha Hunt	(substituted on) 58'
FH	22	Helena Rowland	(substituted on) 58'
CE	23	Emily Scarratt	(substituted on) 62'
Coach:
(New Zealand) John Mitchell

FB	15	Chloe Rollie	(yellow card) 77'
RW	14	Rhona Lloyd
OC	13	Emma Orr
IC	12	Lisa Thomson
LW	11	Francesca McGhie		(substituted off) 53'
FH	10	Helen Nelson (c)		(substituted off) 72'
SH	9	Caity Mattinson		(substituted off) 60'
N8	8	Jade Konkel-Roberts
OF	7	Rachel McLachlan
BF	6	Evie Gallagher
RL	5	Becky Boyd		(substituted off) 66'
LL	4	Sarah Bonar		(substituted off) 72'
TP	3	Elliann Clarke		(substituted off) 66'
HK	2	Lana Skeldon		(substituted off) 53'
LP	1	Anne Young		(substituted off) 53'
Replacements:
HK	16	Elis Martin		(substituted on) 53'
PR	17	Leah Bartlett		(substituted on) 53'
PR	18	Molly Poolman		(substituted on) 66'
LK	19	Adelle Ferrie		(substituted on) 66'
FL	20	Gemma Bell		(substituted on) 72'
SH	21	Rhea Clarke		(substituted on) 60'
CE	22	Rachel Philipps		(substituted on) 72'
FB	23	Lucia Scott		(substituted on) 53'
Coach:
(Scotland) Bryan Easson

Player of the Match:
Claudia MacDonald (England)

Assistant referees:
Maria Heitor (Portugal)
Amber Stamp-Dunstan (Wales)
Television match official:
Matteo Liperini (Italy)
Foul play review officer:
Leo Colgan (Ireland)

20 April 2025
15:00 BST (UTC+1)

Wales	14–40	Ireland (1 BP)
Try: Cox 6' c Bluck 58' c Con: Bevan (2/2) 7', 59'	Report	Try: Djougang (2) 19' c, 53' c Wafer (2) 29' c, 62' c Wall (2) 40+1' c, 43' m Con: O'Brien (3/3) 20', 30', 54'; Breen (2/3) 40+2', 63'

Rodney Parade, Newport
Attendance: 3,568
Referee: Lauren Jenner (Italy)

FB	15	Jasmine Joyce-Butchers	(substituted off) 65'
RW	14	Lisa Neumann
OC	13	Hannah Jones (c)
IC	12	Courtney Keight	(substituted off) 57'
LW	11	Carys Cox
FH	10	Lleucu George
SH	9	Keira Bevan	(substituted off) 68'
N8	8	Alex Callender	(substituted off) 57'
OF	7	Bethan Lewis
BF	6	Kate Williams	(substituted off) 70'
RL	5	Georgia Evans
LL	4	Abbie Fleming
TP	3	Jenni Scoble	(substituted off) 48'
HK	2	Kelsey Jones	(substituted off) 57'
LP	1	Gwenllian Pyrs	(substituted off) 67'
Replacements:
HK	16	Carys Phillips	(substituted on) 57'
PR	17	Maisie Davies	(substituted on) 67'
PR	18	Donna Rose	(substituted on) 48'
LK	19	Natalia John	(substituted on) 57'
LK	20	Alaw Pyrs	(substituted on) 70'
SH	21	Sian Jones	(substituted on) 68'
WG	22	Hannah Bluck	(substituted on) 57'
WG	23	Catherine Richards	(substituted on) 65'
Coach:
(Wales) Sean Lynn

FB	15	Stacey Flood
RW	14	Anna McGann		(substituted off) 59'
OC	13	Aoife Dalton
IC	12	Enya Breen
LW	11	Amee-Leigh Costigan
FH	10	Dannah O'Brien	(yellow card) 36'	(substituted off) 59'
SH	9	Molly Scuffil-McCabe		(substituted off) 59'
N8	8	Aoife Wafer
OF	7	Edel McMahon (c)		(substituted off) 54'
BF	6	Brittany Hogan		(substituted off) 63'
RL	5	Dorothy Wall
LL	4	Ruth Campbell
TP	3	Linda Djougang		(substituted off) 59'
HK	2	Neve Jones		(substituted off) 59'
LP	1	Siobhán McCarthy		(substituted off) 59'
Replacements:
HK	16	Cliodhna Moloney		(substituted on) 59'
PR	17	Sadhbh McGrath		(substituted on) 59'
PR	18	Christy Haney		(substituted on) 59'
LK	19	Fiona Tuite		(substituted on) 63'
FL	20	Claire Boles		(substituted on) 54'
SH	21	Emily Lane		(substituted on) 59'
CE	22	Eve Higgins		(substituted on) 59'
WG	23	Vicky Elmes Kinlan		(substituted on) 59'
Coach:
(England) Scott Bemand

Player of the Match:
Aoife Wafer (Ireland)

Assistant referees:
Aurélie Groizeleau (France)
Maria Heitor (Portugal)
Television match official:
Ian Tempest (RFU)
Foul play review officer:
Andrew McMenemy (Scotland)

=== Round 5 ===
26 April 2025
12:15 BST (UTC+1)

(1 BP) Scotland	26–19	Ireland (1 BP)
Try: Skeldon 24' m Orr 40+1' c McLachlan 57' c McGhie 80' c Con: Nelson (3/4) 40+2', 58', 80+1'	Report	Try: Costigan 10' c Djougang 48' m Lane 71' c Con: O'Brien (2/3) 11', 72'

Edinburgh Rugby Stadium, Edinburgh
Attendance: 6,375
Referee: Natarsha Ganley (New Zealand)

FB	15	Chloe Rollie
RW	14	Rhona Lloyd	(yellow card) 48'	(substituted off) 58'
OC	13	Emma Orr
IC	12	Lisa Thomson
LW	11	Francesca McGhie
FH	10	Helen Nelson	(yellow card) 69'
SH	9	Leia Brebner-Holden
N8	8	Evie Gallagher
OF	7	Rachel McLachlan
BF	6	Rachel Malcolm (c)
RL	5	Sarah Bonar
LL	4	Jade Konkel-Roberts
TP	3	Elliann Clarke		(substituted off) 63'
HK	2	Lana Skeldon		(substituted off) 63'
LP	1	Leah Bartlett		(substituted off) 45'
Replacements:
HK	16	Elis Martin		(substituted on) 63'
PR	17	Anne Young		(substituted on) 45'
PR	18	Molly Poolman		(substituted on) 63'
LK	19	Becky Boyd
FL	20	Gemma Bell
SH	21	Rhea Clarke
CE	22	Evie Wills
FB	23	Lucia Scott		(substituted on) 58'
Coach:
(Scotland) Bryan Easson

FB	15	Aoife Corey
RW	14	Vicky Elmes Kinlan	(substituted off) 46'
OC	13	Aoife Dalton
IC	12	Enya Breen	(substituted off) 38'
LW	11	Amee-Leigh Costigan
FH	10	Dannah O'Brien
SH	9	Molly Scuffil-McCabe	(substituted off) 63'
N8	8	Brittany Hogan
OF	7	Edel McMahon (c)	(substituted off) 21'
BF	6	Dorothy Wall	(substituted off) 17'
RL	5	Fiona Tuite
LL	4	Ruth Campbell
TP	3	Linda Djougang	(substituted off) 63'
HK	2	Neve Jones	(substituted off) 63'
LP	1	Niamh O'Dowd	(substituted off) 8'	(substituted on) 17'	(substituted off) 63'
Replacements:
HK	16	Cliodhna Moloney	(substituted on) 8'	(substituted off) 17'	(substituted on) 63'
PR	17	Sadhbh McGrath	(substituted on) 63'
PR	18	Christy Haney	(substituted on) 63'
LK	19	Jane Clohessy	(substituted on) 21'
FL	20	Claire Boles	(substituted on) 17'
SH	21	Emily Lane	(substituted on) 63'
CE	22	Eve Higgins	(substituted on) 38'
WG	23	Stacey Flood	(substituted on) 46'
Coach:
(England) Scott Bemand

Player of the Match:
Rachel McLachlan (Scotland)

Assistant referees:
Holly Wood (England)
Amber Stamp-Dunstan (Wales)
Television match official:
Dan Jones (England)
Foul play review officer:
Matteo Liperini (Italy)

26 April 2025
16:45 BST (UTC+1)

(1 BP) England	43–42	France (2 BP)
Try: Dow (2) 3' m, 57' m Sing (2) 7' c, 17' c Atkin-Davies 11' m MacDonald 22' c Aldcroft 48' c Con: Harrison (4/7) 8', 18', 23', 49'	Report	Try: Arbez 5' c Sansus 28' c Ménager 37' c Arbey 50' c Bourgeois 69' c Grisez 78' c Con: Bourgeois (6/6) 6', 29', 38', 51', 70', 79'

Twickenham Stadium, London
Attendance: 37,573
Referee: Maggie Cogger-Orr (New Zealand)

FB	15	Emma Sing
RW	14	Abby Dow
OC	13	Megan Jones
IC	12	Tatyana Heard	(substituted off) 62'
LW	11	Claudia MacDonald	(substituted off) 47'
FH	10	Zoe Harrison
SH	9	Natasha Hunt	(substituted off) 50'
N8	8	Alex Matthews
OF	7	Maddie Feaunati	(substituted off) 67'
BF	6	Zoe Aldcroft (c)
RL	5	Abbie Ward
LL	4	Morwenna Talling	(substituted off) 62'
TP	3	Maud Muir	(substituted off) 50'
HK	2	Lark Atkin-Davies	(substituted off) 50'
LP	1	Hannah Botterman	(substituted off) 50'
Replacements:
HK	16	Amy Cokayne	(substituted on) 50'
PR	17	Kelsey Clifford	(substituted on) 50'
PR	18	Sarah Bern	(substituted on) 50'
LK	19	Rosie Galligan	(substituted on) 62'
FL	20	Abi Burton	(substituted on) 67'
SH	21	Lucy Packer	(substituted on) 50'
FH	22	Holly Aitchison	(substituted on) 62'
CE	23	Helena Rowland	(substituted on) 47'
Coach:
(New Zealand) John Mitchell

FB	15	Morgane Bourgeois
RW	14	Joanna Grisez
OC	13	Marine Ménager (cc)
IC	12	Gabrielle Vernier		(substituted off) 6'	(substituted on) 19'
LW	11	Kelly Arbey
FH	10	Carla Arbez		(substituted off) 55'
SH	9	Pauline Bourdon Sansus		(substituted off) 62'
N8	8	Teani Feleu
OF	7	Léa Champon
BF	6	Charlotte Escudero		(substituted off) 27'	(substituted on) 33'	(substituted off) 60'
RL	5	Madoussou Fall		(substituted off) 70'
LL	4	Manaé Feleu (cc)		(substituted off) 70'
TP	3	Assia Khalfaoui	(yellow card) 21'			(substituted off) 50'
HK	2	Manon Bigot		(substituted off) 50'
LP	1	Yllana Brosseau		(substituted off) 50'
Replacements:
HK	16	Élisa Riffonneau		(substituted on) 50'
PR	17	Ambre Mwayembe		(substituted on) 50'
PR	18	Rose Bernadou		(substituted on) 27'	(substituted off) 33'	(substituted on) 50'
LK	19	Kiara Zago		(substituted on) 70'
FL	20	Axelle Berthoumieu		(substituted on) 6'	(substituted off) 19'	(substituted on) 60'
FL	21	Taina Maka		(substituted on) 70'
SH	22	Alexandra Chambon		(substituted on) 62'
CE	23	Lina Queyroi		(substituted on) 55'
Coach:
(France) Gaëlle Mignot & (France) David Ortiz

Player of the Match:
Zoe Aldcroft (England)

Assistant referees:
Lauren Jenner (Italy)
Maria Heitor (Portugal)
Television match official:
Quinton Immelmann (South Africa)
Foul play review officer:
Leo Colgan (Ireland)

27 April 2025 (Note: The Round 5 match between Italy and Wales was rescheduled from its original date of 26 April 2025, in order to avoid a clash with the funeral of Pope Francis.)
12:30 CEST (UTC+2)

(1 BP) Italy	44–12	Wales
Try: Stefan 16' c Granzotto (2) 53' c, 77' m Turani 57' c Minuzzi 63' m Muzzo 80+1' c Con: Sillari (4/6) 17', 54', 58', 80+2'; Pen: Sillari (2/2) 22', 48'	Report	Try: Williams 9' m Pyrs 40+1' c Con: Bevan (1/2) 40+2'

Stadio Sergio Lanfranchi, Parma
Attendance: 1,899
Referee: Sara Cox (England)

FB	15	Vittoria Ostuni Minuzzi
RW	14	Aura Muzzo
OC	13	Michela Sillari
IC	12	Sara Mannini	(substituted off) 58'
LW	11	Alyssa D'Inca	(substituted off) 40'
FH	10	Veronica Madia
SH	9	Sofia Stefan	(substituted off) 66'
N8	8	Elisa Giordano (c)
OF	7	Francesca Sgorbini	(substituted off) 78'
BF	6	Beatrice Veronese	(substituted off) 64'
RL	5	Giordana Duca
LL	4	Sara Tounesi
TP	3	Sara Seye	(substituted off) 69'
HK	2	Vittoria Vecchini	(substituted off) 74'
LP	1	Silvia Turani	(substituted off) 74'
Replacements:
HK	16	Desiree Spinelli	(substituted on) 74'
PR	17	Emanuela Stecca	(substituted on) 74'
PR	18	Gaia Maris	(substituted on) 69'
LK	19	Isabella Locatelli	(substituted on) 78'
FL	20	Alissa Ranuccini	(substituted on) 64'
SH	21	Alia Bitonci	(substituted on) 66'
CE	22	Beatrice Rigoni	(substituted on) 58'
WG	23	Francesca Granzotto	(substituted on) 40'
Coach:
(Italy) Fabio Roselli

FB	15	Jasmine Joyce-Butchers		(substituted off) 69'
RW	14	Lisa Neumann
OC	13	Hannah Jones (c)
IC	12	Courtney Keight		(substituted off) 51'
LW	11	Carys Cox
FH	10	Lleucu George
SH	9	Keira Bevan		(substituted off) 69'
N8	8	Georgia Evans		(substituted off) 57'
OF	7	Bethan Lewis
BF	6	Kate Williams
RL	5	Gwen Crabb		(substituted off) 48'
LL	4	Abbie Fleming
TP	3	Donna Rose		(substituted off) 62'
HK	2	Kelsey Jones		(substituted off) 51'
LP	1	Gwenllian Pyrs		(substituted off) 69'
Replacements:
HK	16	Carys Phillips		(substituted on) 51'
PR	17	Maisie Davies		(substituted on) 69'
PR	18	Jenni Scoble		(substituted on) 62'
LK	19	Natalia John	(yellow card) 75'	(substituted on) 57'
FL	20	Alex Callender		(substituted on) 48'
SH	21	Sian Jones		(substituted on) 69'
WG	22	Hannah Bluck		(substituted on) 51'
WG	23	Catherine Richards		(substituted on) 69'
Coach:
(Wales) Sean Lynn

Player of the Match:
Giordana Duca (Italy)

Assistant referees:
Maria Latos (Germany)
Alexandra Ferré (France)
Television match official:
Andrew McMenemy (Scotland)
Foul play review officer:
Ian Tempest (England)

== Player statistics ==
=== Most points ===
As of 27 April 2025

Rank	Name	Team	Points
1	Morgane Bourgeois	France	73
2	Zoe Harrison	England	37
3	Abby Dow	England	30
4	Helen Nelson	Scotland	24
4	Dannah O'Brien	Ireland	24
6	Emma Sing	England	21
7	Ellie Kildunne	England	20
7	Claudia MacDonald	England	20
7	Linda Djougang	Ireland	20
7	Aoife Wafer	Ireland	20
7	Michela Sillari	Italy	20
7	Aura Muzzo	Italy	20

=== Most tries ===
As of 27 April 2025

Rank	Name	Team	Tries
1	Abby Dow	England	6
2	Ellie Kildunne	England	4
2	Claudia MacDonald	England	4
2	Linda Djougang	Ireland	4
2	Aoife Wafer	Ireland	4
2	Aura Muzzo	Italy	4
7	10 players tied		3

== Discipline ==
=== Summary ===
As of 27 April 2025

Team	Yellow card	Red card	Total
England	0	0	0
France	2	1	3
Ireland	3	0	3
Italy	2	0	2
Scotland	4	1	5
Wales	3	1	4

=== Yellow cards ===
- (France) Madoussou Fall (vs. Italy)
- (France) Assia Khalfaoui (vs. England)
- (Ireland) Linda Djougang (vs. Italy)
- (Ireland) Dannah O'Brien (vs. Wales)
- (Ireland) Niamh O'Dowd (vs. England)
- (Italy) Valeria Fedrighi (vs. Ireland)
- (Italy) Laura Gurioli (vs. England)
- (Scotland) Rhona Lloyd (vs. Ireland)
- (Scotland) Helen Nelson (vs. Ireland)
- (Scotland) Chloe Rollie (vs. England)
- (Scotland) Lisa Thomson (vs. Italy)
- (Wales) Maisie Davies (vs. France)
- (Wales) Georgia Evans (vs. Scotland)
- (Wales) Natalia John (vs. Italy)

=== Red cards ===
- (France) Gabrielle Vernier (vs. Ireland)
- (Scotland) Evie Gallagher (vs. Wales)
- (Wales) Georgia Evans (vs. Scotland)

=== Citings/bans ===
Player	Match	Citing date	Law breached	Result	Ref
Evie Gallagher	**Scotland** vs. Wales (Round 1 – 22 March 2025)	25 March 2025	9.20 – Dangerous Play in a Ruck or Maul (Red card)	1-match ban	
Georgia Evans	Scotland vs. **Wales** (Round 1 – 22 March 2025)	25 March 2025	9.27 – 2 Yellow Cards (Red card)	Sending off sufficient	
Gabrielle Vernier	Ireland vs. **France** (Round 1 – 22 March 2025)	26 March 2025	9.13 – Dangerous Tackle (Red card)	3-match ban (Note: The suspension is reduced by one match, subject to the player's completion of the World Rugby Coaching Intervention Programme.)	

Note: The cited player's team is listed in bold italics.

== Awards ==
=== Player of the Match awards ===
Awards	Player	Team	Opponent
1	Maddie Feaunati	England	Italy ^{(R1)}
1	Ellie Kildunne	England	Wales ^{(R2)}
1	Maud Muir	England	Ireland ^{(R3)}
1	Claudia MacDonald	England	Scotland ^{(R4)}
1	Zoe Aldcroft	England	France ^{(R5)}
1	Teani Feleu	France	Ireland ^{(R1)}
1	Manaé Feleu	France	Scotland ^{(R2)}
1	Manon Bigot	France	Wales ^{(R3)}
1	Madoussou Fall	France	Italy ^{(R4)}
1	Aoife Dalton	Ireland	Italy ^{(R2)}
1	Aoife Wafer	Ireland	Wales ^{(R4)}
1	Aura Muzzo	Italy	Scotland ^{(R3)}
1	Giordana Duca	Italy	Wales ^{(R5)}
1	Helen Nelson	Scotland	Wales ^{(R1)}
1	Rachel McLachlan	Scotland	Ireland ^{(R5)}

=== Player of the Championship ===
Four players were nominated for the 2025 Women's Six Nations Player of the Championship on 29 April 2025. Ireland number 8 Aoife Wafer was announced as the winner on 19 May 2025.

Team	Nominee	Position
England	Abby Dow	Wing
France	Manaé Feleu	Lock
Scotland	Evie Gallagher	Back row
Ireland	**Aoife Wafer**	Back row

- Winner listed in **bold**

=== Try of the Championship ===
Four players were nominated for the 2025 Women's Six Nations Try of the Championship on 30 April 2025. France wing Joanna Grisez was announced as the winner on 20 May 2025.

Team	Nominee	Try
England	Abby Dow	vs. Scotland ^{(R4)}
France	**Joanna Grisez**	vs. England ^{(R5)}
Ireland	Anna McGann	vs. Italy ^{(R2)}
Italy	Aura Muzzo	Scotland ^{(R3)}

- Winner listed in **bold**

=== Team of the Championship ===
The 15 players voted in as the 2025 Women's Six Nations Team of the Championship were announced on 28 April 2025.

Forwards
No.	Team	Player
1	Italy	Silvia Turani
2	Ireland	Neve Jones
3	England	Sarah Bern
4	England	Abbie Ward
5	France	Manaé Feleu
6	Ireland	Aoife Wafer
7	Scotland	Evie Gallagher
8	France	Teani Feleu

Backs
No.	Team	Player
9	France	Pauline Bourdon Sansus
10	Scotland	Helen Nelson
11	Italy	Aura Muzzo
12	Ireland	Aoife Dalton
13	England	Megan Jones
14	England	Abby Dow
15	France	Morgane Bourgeois

=== BKT Rising Player Award ===
On 26 April 2025, France back-row Séraphine Okemba was named as the winner of the BKT Rising Player Award. The prize recognises players "who have made an instant impact on the international stage", and "celebrates both individual brilliance and the team-first attitude that defines the Six Nations". Only players who made their first Women's Six Nations appearance in 2025 were eligible. The other two final candidates for the award were England centre Jade Shekells and Italy fly-half Alia Bitonci.

== See also ==
- 2025 Six Nations Championship
- Women's Six Nations Championship
- Women's international rugby union
