= Ambre Mwayembe =

French rugby union player (born 2004)

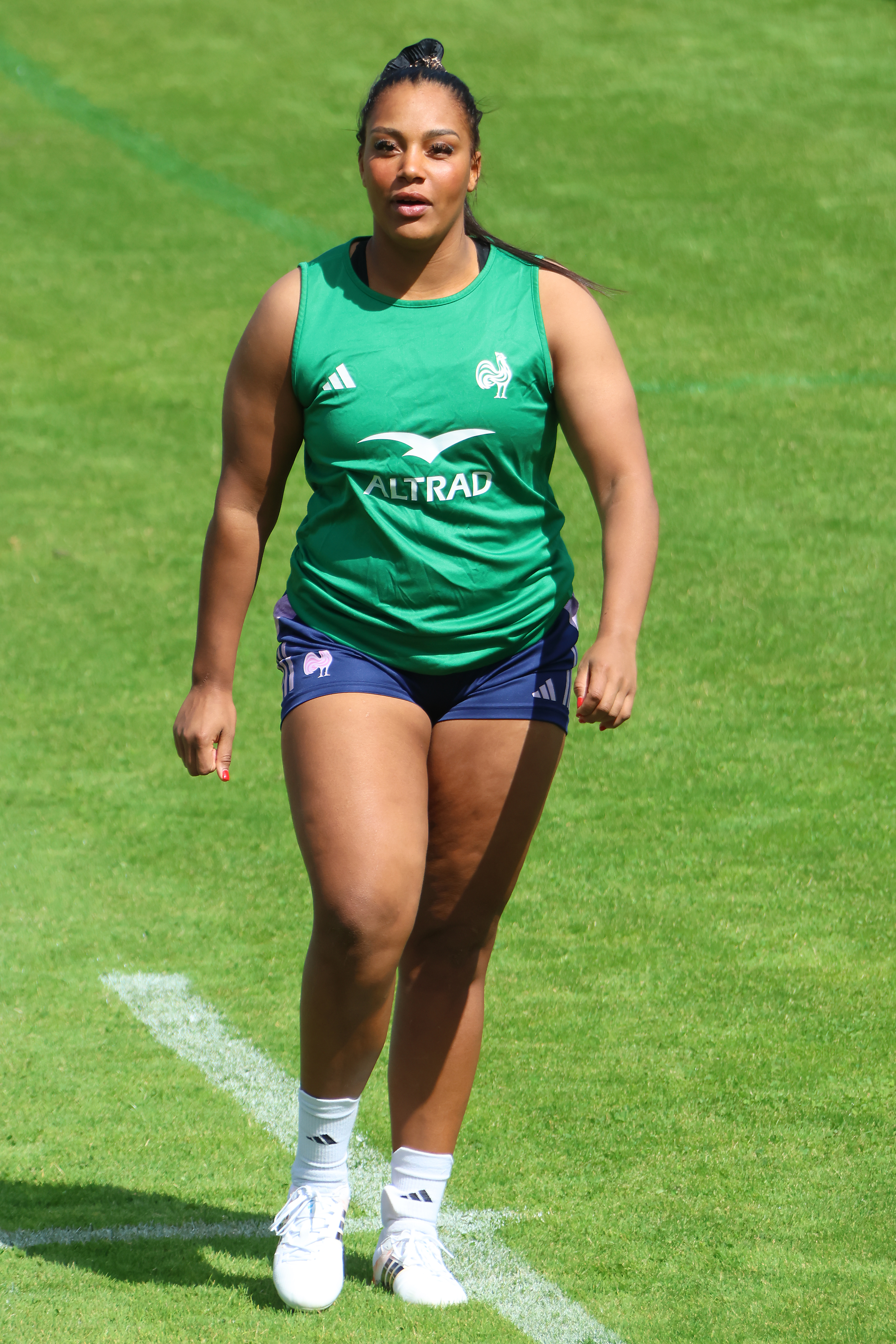
- Born: 1 March 2004 (age 22)
- Height: 1.73 m (5 ft 8 in)

Rugby union career
Senior career
Years	Team	Apps	(Points)
2019-2015	Amazones		
2025	Stade Toulousain		
International career
Years	Team	Apps	(Points)
2022	France U20		
2023-	France		

Ambre Mwayembe (born 1 March 2004) is a French rugby union player.

== Biography ==
=== Early life and education ===
Mwayembe grew up in Vizille, France, where she began playing rugby at the age of 10.

=== Club career ===
==== FC Grenoble (2019-2025) ====
In 2019, Mwayembe joined the Amazones, the women's team of FC Grenoble, competing in France's Elite 1 league.

==== Stade Toulousain (2025-present) ====
In February 2025, she announced her departure to join Stade Toulousain from the 2025–2026 season, saying she “needed to look elsewhere” to continue her progression.

=== International career ===
In 2022, Mwayembe's played for the French Under-20 team against England. In February 2023, she was selected for the French national squad preparing for the 2023 Women's Six Nations Championship. She made her senior debut on April 16, 2023, against Scotland. Ambre Mwayembe took part in the 2024 WXV with the French women's XV rugby team.

==== 2025 Women's Six Nations Championship ====
Ambre Mwayembe participated in the 2025 Women's Six Nations Championship. During France's opening match against Scotland on March 29, 2025, she entered the game as a substitute, replacing Yllana Brosseau in the 51th minute.
