= Alexandra Chambon =

French international rugby union player

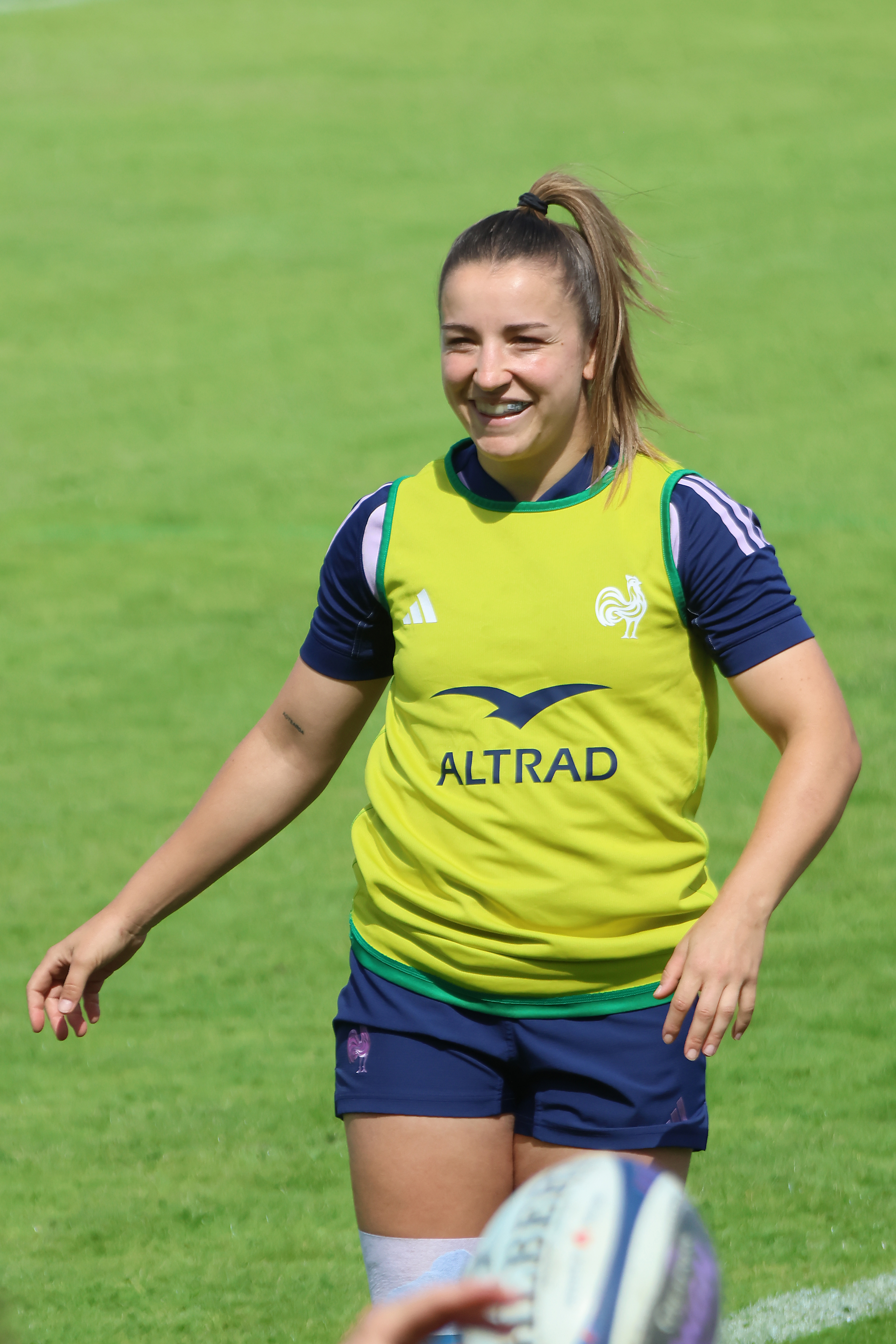
- Born: 2 August 2000 (age 26)
- Height: 161 cm (5 ft 3 in)

Rugby union career
- Position: Scrum Half
Senior career
Years	Team	Apps	(Points)
2018–	FC Grenoble Amazones		(0)
International career
Years	Team	Apps	(Points)
2021–	France	36	(10)

Alexandra Chambon (born 2 August 2000) is a French rugby union player who plays for FC Grenoble Amazones and the France women's national rugby union team. She represented France at the 2021 Rugby World Cup, played in late 2022 after being delayed due to the COVID-19 pandemic.

== Career ==
A scrum half from Montmélian, Alexandra Champon received her first international cap in November 2021 in a 46–3 win against South Africa in Vannes. Her second cap came at the Stade des Alpes in Grenoble in the Six Nations.

She was named in France's team for the delayed 2021 Rugby World Cup in New Zealand. Chambon reflected that if the tournament had not been delayed she would not have been part of the squad and that France was enjoying their status as relative outsiders compared to the tournament favourites.

She was named in France's side for the 2025 Women's Six Nations Championship on 7 March. On 2 August, she was selected in the French squad to the Women's Rugby World Cup in England.
