= Aoife Dalton =

Ireland international rugby union player (born 2003)

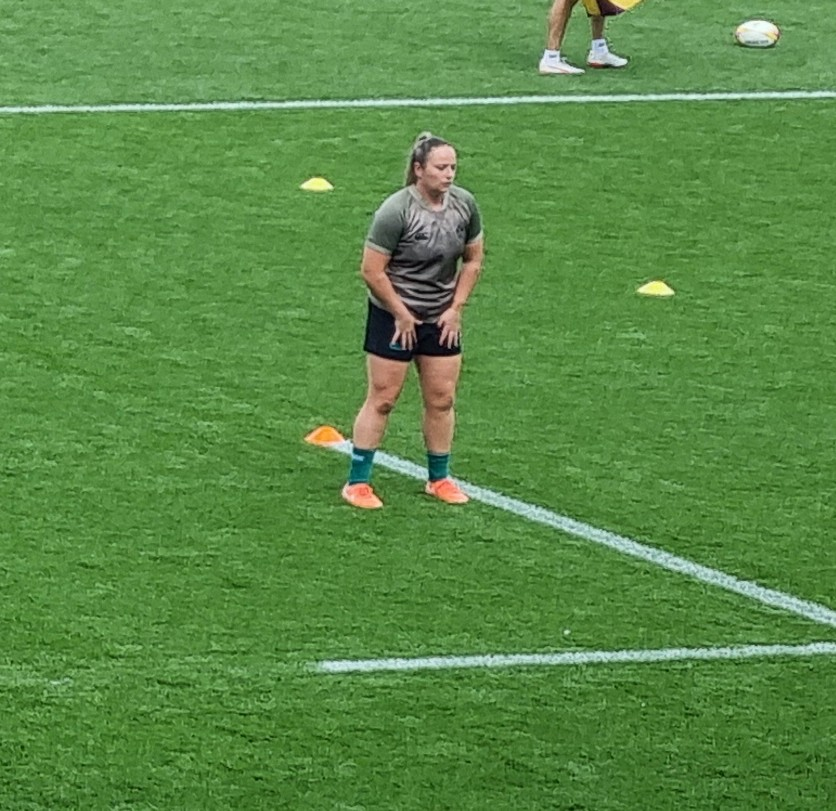
- 2025 World Cup in Northampton
- Born: 3 May 2003 (age 23) Clara, County Offaly
- Height: 158 cm (5 ft 2 in)
- Weight: 70 kg (154 lb; 11 st 0 lb)

Rugby union career
- Current team: Leinster
Amateur team(s)
Years	Team	Apps	(Points)
- Tullamore RFC
Senior career
Years	Team	Apps	(Points)
- Old Belvedere
Provincial / State sides
Years	Team	Apps	(Points)
- Leinster
International career
Years	Team	Apps	(Points)
2022-	Ireland	28	(30)
- Correct as of 24 September 2025
National sevens team
Years	Team		Comps
2024	Ireland		

Aoife Dalton (born 3 May 2003) is an Irish rugby union footballer who plays as a centre for Leinster and Ireland women's national rugby union team. She also represented Ireland Sevens in rugby sevens at the 2024 Olympic Games.

== Career ==
From Clara, County Offaly, she played domestic rugby union for Tullamore RFC before later playing for Old Belvedere R.F.C. and Leinster Rugby.

She made her international debut for Ireland women's national rugby union team against Japan in 2022 at the age of 19 years-old. She continued with the squad to play the 2023 Women's Six Nations Championship. She was named the Irish young player of the year in 2023.

She represented Ireland women's national rugby sevens team in the rugby sevens competition at the 2024 Olympic Games in Paris, France. Later that year, she was shortlisted for the 2024 Guinness Rugby Writers of Ireland Women's XV Player of the Year Award.

She was named Rugby Players Ireland Women's Players’ Player of the Year for 2025 following the 2025 Women's Six Nations Championship, in which she was named in the Team of the Championship and played all 400 minutes of Ireland's games. On 11 August, she was selected in the Irish squad to the Rugby World Cup. She continued with Ireland for their 2026 Six Nations Championship campaign.
