= Giordana Duca =

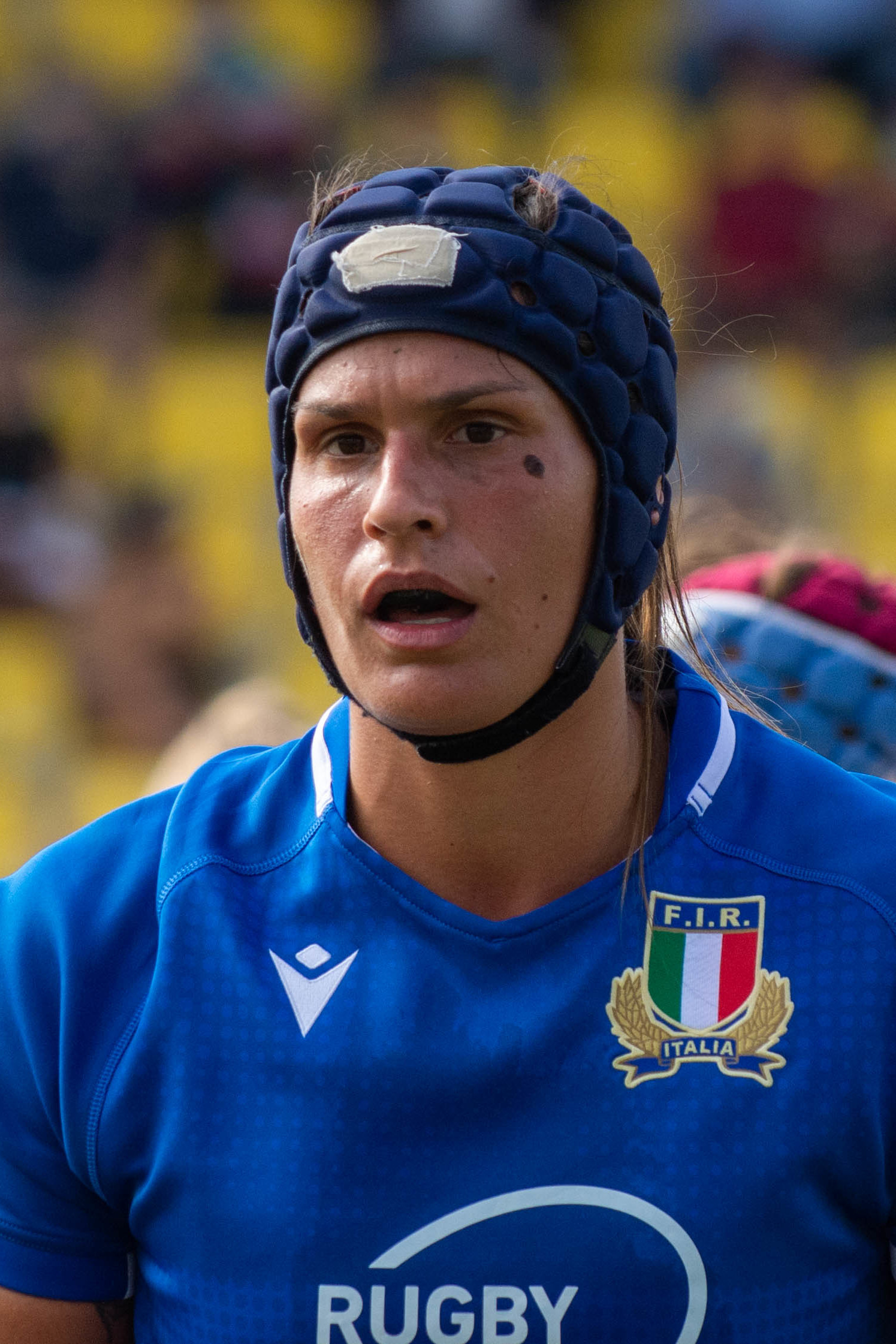
- Duca in 2021
- Born: 18 September 1992 (age 34) Frascati, Italy
- Height: 1.85 m (6 ft 1 in)
- Weight: 83 kg (183 lb)

Rugby union career
- Position: Lock
Senior career
Years	Team	Apps	(Points)
2010–13	Frascati		(0)
2013–15	Red & Blue		(0)
2015–18	Frascati		(0)
2018–19	Capitoline		(0)
2019–	Valsugana		(0)
International career
Years	Team	Apps	(Points)
2018–	Italy	60	(15)

Giordana Duca (born 18 September 1992) is an Italian rugby union player. She plays as a Lock for the Italy women's national rugby union team and at club level for Valsugana. She competed at the 2021 Rugby World Cup.

== Rugby career ==
Duca played for Frascati and Red & Blue Rugby. She was called up for the 2018 Six Nations during which she made her national debut in Reggio Emilia against England and played a total of 4 matches. The following November, she played in Calvisano against Scotland during test matches at the end of the year, and scored her first international goal.

After a season with Capitolina Rugby team, Duca played in Padua with Valsugana starting from the 2019–20 season.

She competed at the 2022 Women's Six Nations Championship and then at the delayed 2021 Rugby World Cup.

She was named in the Italian squad for the 2025 Women's Six Nations Championship. On 11 August, she was named in the side to the Women's Rugby World Cup in England.
