= Sara Mannini =

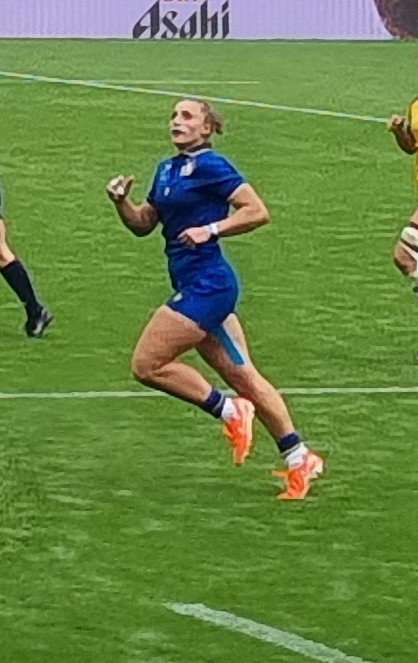
- 2025 Rugby World Cup in Northampton
- Born: 28 August 2005 (age 21) Pisa, Italy
- Height: 177 cm (5 ft 10 in)
- Weight: 73 kg (161 lb; 11 st 7 lb)

Rugby union career
- Position: fly-half
- Current team: Colorno Women
Senior career
Years	Team	Apps	(Points)
	Colorno Women		(0)
International career
Years	Team	Apps	(Points)
2024–	Italy	12	(5)

Sara Mannini (born 28 August 2005) is an Italian international rugby union player who plays as fly-half for the women's team of Rugby Colorno. Since 2024, she also represents Italy at senior level.

== Career ==
Mannini is from Pisa and started playing rugby union in 2015 at CUS Pisa. She went on to play for Puma Bisenzio Rugby in Prato. After playing for Italy at under-18 level she went on to play domestically in the Women's Elite Series A for club side Colorno.

She represented Italy in the Under 20 Women’s Summer Series in Parma in 2024 where she was named in the Team of the Series. She was selected for her senior international debut for Italy women's national rugby union team against Japan in the WXV in September 2024 in Piacenza.

She continued with the Italian team and was selected for the 2025 Women's Six Nations Championship. She was named in the Italian squad for the Rugby World Cup in England.
