= Aura Muzzo =

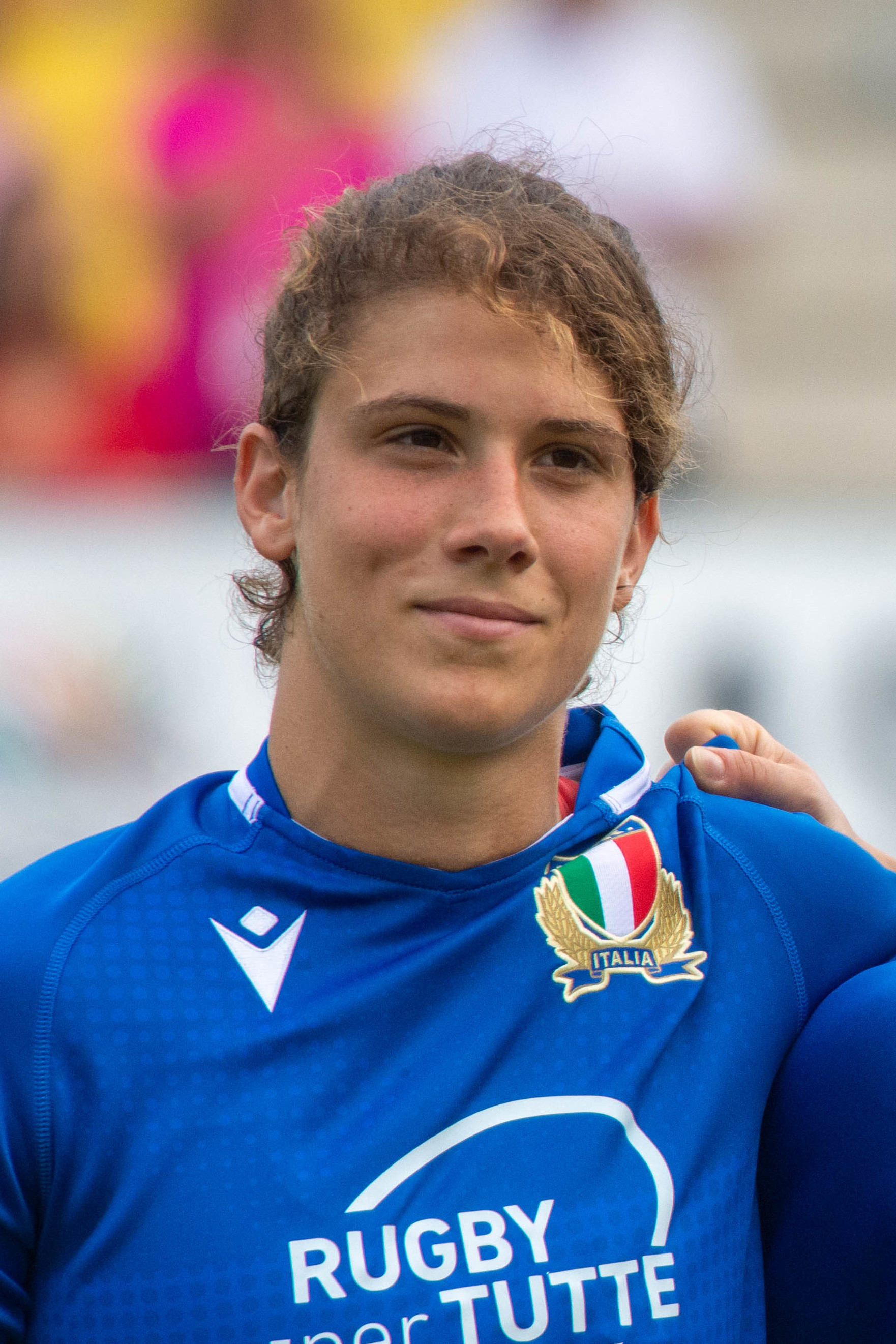
- Muzzo before Italy's 2021 RWC qualification match against Spain
- Born: 12 April 1997 (age 29) San Vito al Tagliamento
- Height: 171 cm (5 ft 7 in)
- Weight: 68 kg (150 lb; 10 st 10 lb)

Rugby union career
- Position: Centre
Senior career
| Years | Team | Apps | (Points) |
| 2015–2017 | Pordenone | | (0) |
| 2017– | Villorba | | (0) |
International career
| Years | Team | Apps | (Points) |
| 2017– | Italy | 58 | (70) |

Aura Muzzo (born 12 April 1997) is an Italian rugby union player. She competed for Italy at the delayed 2021 Rugby World Cup.

== Rugby career ==
Muzzo participated in artistic gymnastics as a youngster, a discipline she practiced for fourteen years. She later switched to rugby, she joined Pordenone in 2015 and became successful at an international level in the seven-a-side discipline.

In 2017, together with her move to Villorba in the Serie A competition, she was also called up into the Italian national team for the Women's Rugby World Cup in Ireland, although she never competed during the tournament. Her international debut took place a few months later on 19 November in Biella, it was in a test match against France, which her side lost 21–41. She featured in four matches during the 2018 Six Nations.

Muzzo was selected in the Italian side for the delayed 2021 Rugby World Cup in New Zealand. She scored a brace of tries as the Italians fought their way back for a 22–10 win over the United States in their opening Pool B match at the World Cup. Her side created history by being the first Italian team to progress to a rugby quarter-finals. They defeated Japan 21–8 in their final pool match to reach the knockout stage.

She competed in the 2024 Six Nations that started in March. She then played in the September test against Japan ahead of the WXV competition. She subsequently took part in the WXV 2 tournament in Cape Town a few weeks later.

She was named in Italy's squad for the Women's Six Nations Championship on 5 March 2025. In August, she made the Italian side to the Women's Rugby World Cup in England.
