= Abbie Fleming =

Wales international rugby union player

- Born: 31 March 1996 (age 30) Exeter, England
- Height: 175 cm (5 ft 9 in)
- Weight: 74 kg (163 lb)
- Occupation(s): Physiotherapist, rugby player

Rugby union career
- Position: Flanker / Lock
- Current team: Harlequins
Amateur team(s)
Years	Team	Apps	(Points)
- Llandaff North
Senior career
Years	Team	Apps	(Points)
	Cardiff Blues		(0)
2020–	Exeter Chiefs	27	(0)
	Harlequins		(0)
International career
Years	Team	Apps	(Points)
2019–	Wales	32	(15)

Abbie Fleming (born 31 March 1996) is a Welsh rugby union player who plays flanker for the Wales women's national rugby union team and lock for Harlequins in the Premier 15s. She made her international debut for Wales against Spain in 2019.

== Rugby career ==
=== Club career ===
Fleming began playing rugby at the age of 12. Following a move to Wales from her hometown of Exeter she played for Topsham Tempests RFC, Llandaff North RFC and then Cardiff Blues in Welsh regional rugby, captaining the side in the summer of 2019. She joined Exeter Chiefs in 2020.

=== International career ===
Fleming won her first cap against Spain in the 2019 Autumn Internationals and subsequently represented Wales at the 2021 Six Nations Championship. She has also played against the Barbarians at the Principality Stadium.

In January 2022, She was one of 31 Welsh players who have received full-time contracts. She was selected for Wales sevens squad for the Lisbon leg of the 2022 Rugby Europe Sevens Championship Series.

Fleming has won three caps in her rugby career to date. She played in the warm-up match against Canada ahead of the World Cup. She was selected in Wales squad for the 2021 Rugby World Cup in New Zealand.

She was named in the Welsh side for the 2025 Six Nations Championship in March. On 11 August 2025, she was named in the Welsh squad to the Women's Rugby World Cup in England.

== Personal life ==
Fleming was temporarily unable to play rugby following an ACL reconstruction procedure in April 2019.

Outside of rugby, Fleming is a qualified community and hospital physiotherapist in Bridgend, South Wales. During the COVID-19 pandemic she was on the NHS frontline working as part of the respiratory on-call rota at Princess of Wales Hospital, Bridgend.
