= Valeria Fedrighi =

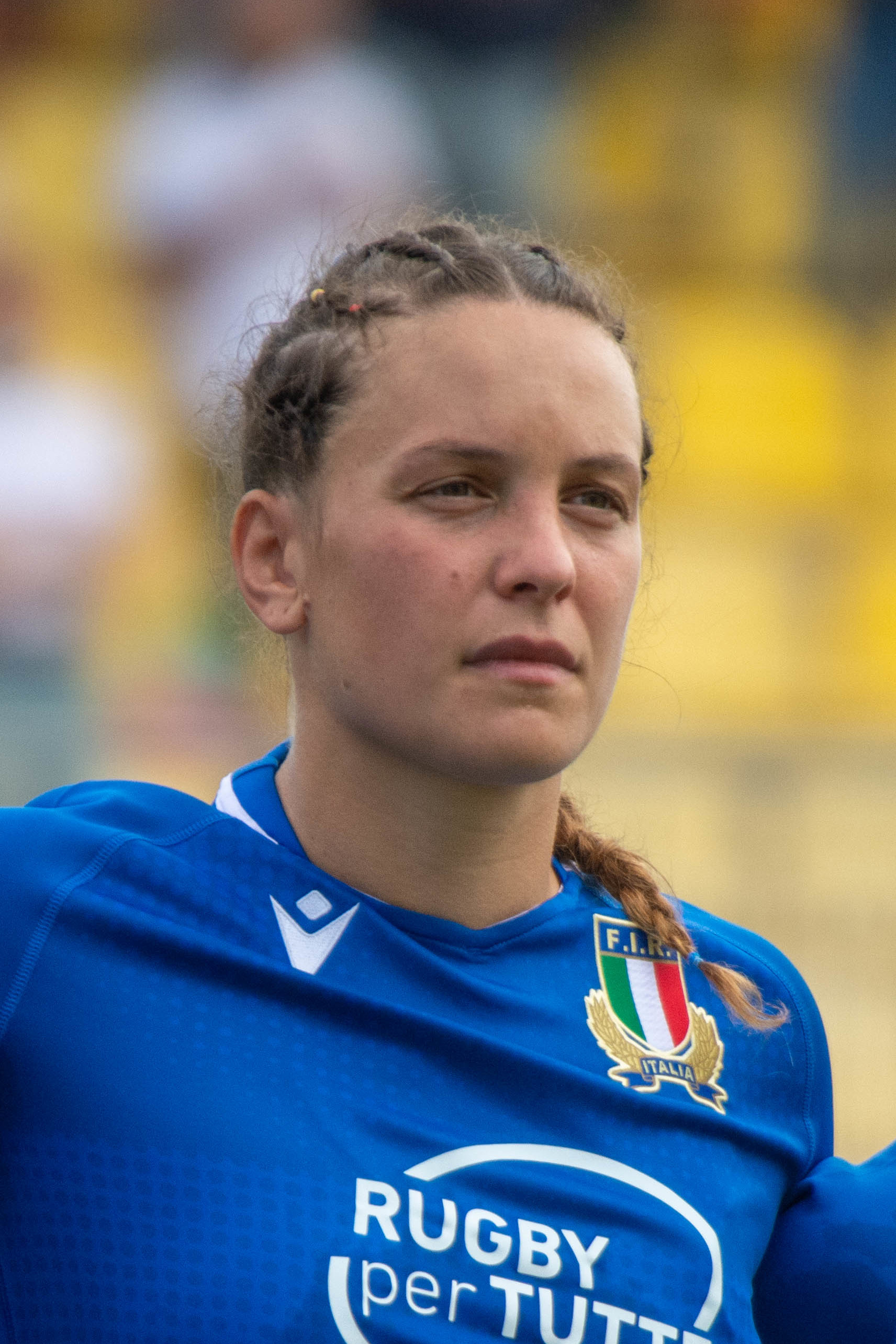
- Fedrighi before the RWC 2021 qualification match against Spain
- Born: 5 September 1992 (age 34) Negrar, Italy
- Height: 180 cm (5 ft 11 in)
- Weight: 82 kg (181 lb; 12 st 13 lb)

Rugby union career
- Position: Lock
Senior career
Years	Team	Apps	(Points)
2016–2017	Rugby Riviera		(0)
2017–2018	Saracens		(0)
2018–2024	Toulouse		(0)
2024–	Rugby Colorno		(0)
International career
Years	Team	Apps	(Points)
2017–Present	Italy	67	(20)

Valeria Fedrighi (born 5 September 1992) is an Italian rugby union player. She plays Lock for Italy internationally and for Rugby Colorno at club level. She has competed at the 2017 and 2021 Rugby World Cup's.

== Rugby career ==
Fedrighi started playing rugby in 2011 at the age of 19 after previously playing volleyball, she joined the Verona women 's seven-a-side team; in 2016 she was on loan to the Riviera fifteen-a- side team. In February 2017 she was called up to the Italy women's team for the Six Nations, during which she made her test debut against England.

With only three appearances under her belt, she was part of the team that played in the 2017 Women's Rugby World Cup in Ireland; in autumn 2017 she was signed by the Saracens women's team in England with whom she won the national title in 2018. She then joined Toulouse in 2018, before moving to Rugby Colorno in 2024.

She graduated in Cultural Heritage at the University of Verona.

Fedrighi was named in Italy's squad for the 2025 Women's Six Nations Championship. On 11 August 2025, she was named in the Italian squad to the Women's Rugby World Cup in England.
