= Manon Bigot =

French rugby union player (born 1990)

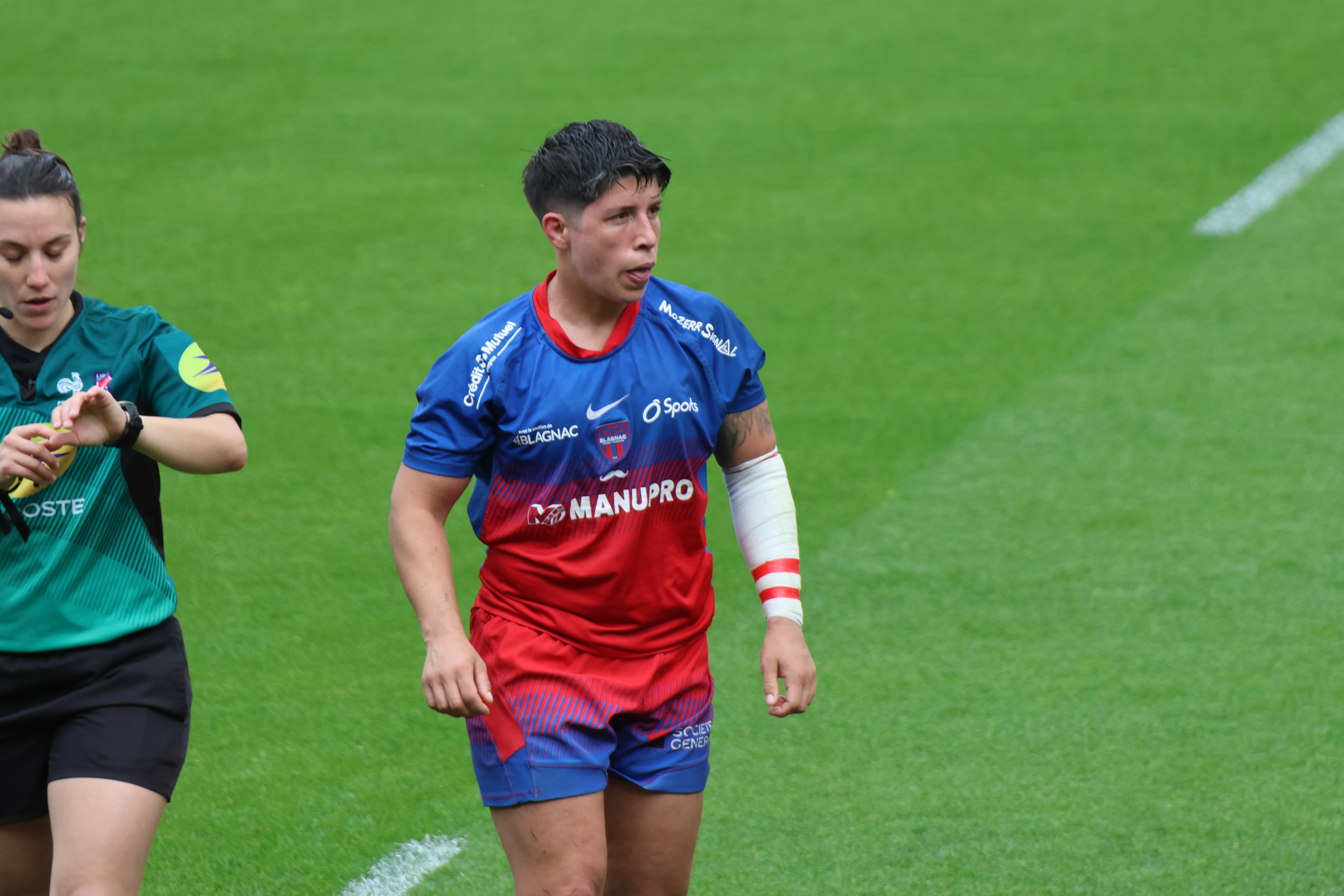
- Born: 6 June 1990 (age 36)
- Height: 170 cm (5 ft 7 in)

Rugby union career
- Position: Hooker
Senior career
Years	Team	Apps	(Points)
2013–	Blagnac SCR		(0)
International career
Years	Team	Apps	(Points)
2016–Present	France	17	(10)

Manon Bigot (French: [manɔ̃ biɡo]; born 6 June 1990) is a French rugby union player who plays as a hooker for Blagnac SCR and the French national team.

== Biography ==
=== Early life ===
Manon Bigot was born on 6 June 1990. She did not start playing rugby until she was 23.

Originally from Vallières-les-Grandes, in the Loir-et-Cher region, Bigot discovered rugby as a child, watching her father play in Loches. Despite her early interest in the sport, she was unable to find a women's structure in her region. She briefly played with boys at the Pocé-sur-Cisse club, but the section soon closed. She then turned to handball in high school, in the sports section at Vendôme, and played pivot for the Selles-sur-Cher club.

Before taking up rugby, she served in the French Army as part of the 27th Mountain Infantry Battalion based in Annecy.

=== Club career ===
Bigot joined Blagnac in 2013. She played with the club until 2018, when she took a five-year hiatus to pursue her dream of becoming a professional firefighter. In 2023, she returned to Blagnac.

=== International career ===
In March 2024, having previously earned her first cap in 2016, she made her return to the French national team when she was called up to the 32-player squad preparing for the 2024 Six Nations Championship. She was again called up to the national team for the 2025 Six Nations.

On 2 August 2025, she was selected in the French side to the Women's Rugby World Cup in England.
