= Natalia John =

Wales international rugby union player

- Born: 15 February 1996 (age 30) Pontypridd, Wales
- Height: 175 cm (5 ft 9 in)
- Weight: 90 kg (198 lb)
- School: Ysgol Gyfun Gwyr
- University: Swansea University
- Occupation(s): Physics teacher, rugby player

Rugby union career
- Position: Second row
- Current team: Bristol Bears
Senior career
Years	Team	Apps	(Points)
2020-present	Bristol Bears		(0)
	Ospreys		(0)
	Swansea RFC		(0)
International career
Years	Team	Apps	(Points)
2018–present	Wales	43	
- Correct as of 06 May 2021

Natalia John (born 15 February 1996) is a Welsh Rugby Union player who plays second row for the Wales women's national rugby union team and Bristol Bears. She made her debut for the Wales national squad in 2018 and represented them at the 2021 Women's Six Nations Championship.

== Club career ==
John began playing rugby in 2014 while studying at Swansea University. She first played with her local team, Bonymaen, before signing with premiership team Swansea RFC in 2016. In 2017, John was selected to play for the Ospreys, where her impressive performance led to a call-up to Wales' autumn series training squad later that year. She signed with her current club, Bristol Bears, in 2020.

== International career ==
Following her call-up to the training squad in 2017, John was selected for the 2018 Women's Six Nations Championship team, where she made her international debut against Scotland. She has since represented the Wales women's team at each subsequent Six Nations Championship.

In 2019, she was part of the first Welsh side to face British invitational rugby union club Barbarians FC, at a Principality Stadium double-header in Cardiff.

John was selected for the Wales squad for the 2021 Rugby World Cup in New Zealand. She was named in the Welsh side for the 2025 Six Nations Championship in March.

== Personal life ==
John attended Welsh language secondary school Ysgol Gyfun Gwyr before later studying materials engineering at Swansea University, where she graduated with a degree in 2017.

She was the second in her family to face the Barbarians wearing a number 4 shirt. Her father, Gareth John, played for Penarth in the final Good Friday fixture against the invitational side in March 1986.

John is a qualified physics teacher but is now a full-time rugby player for Wales and is one of the first twelve women to have a professional contract for Wales.
