= Silvia Turani =

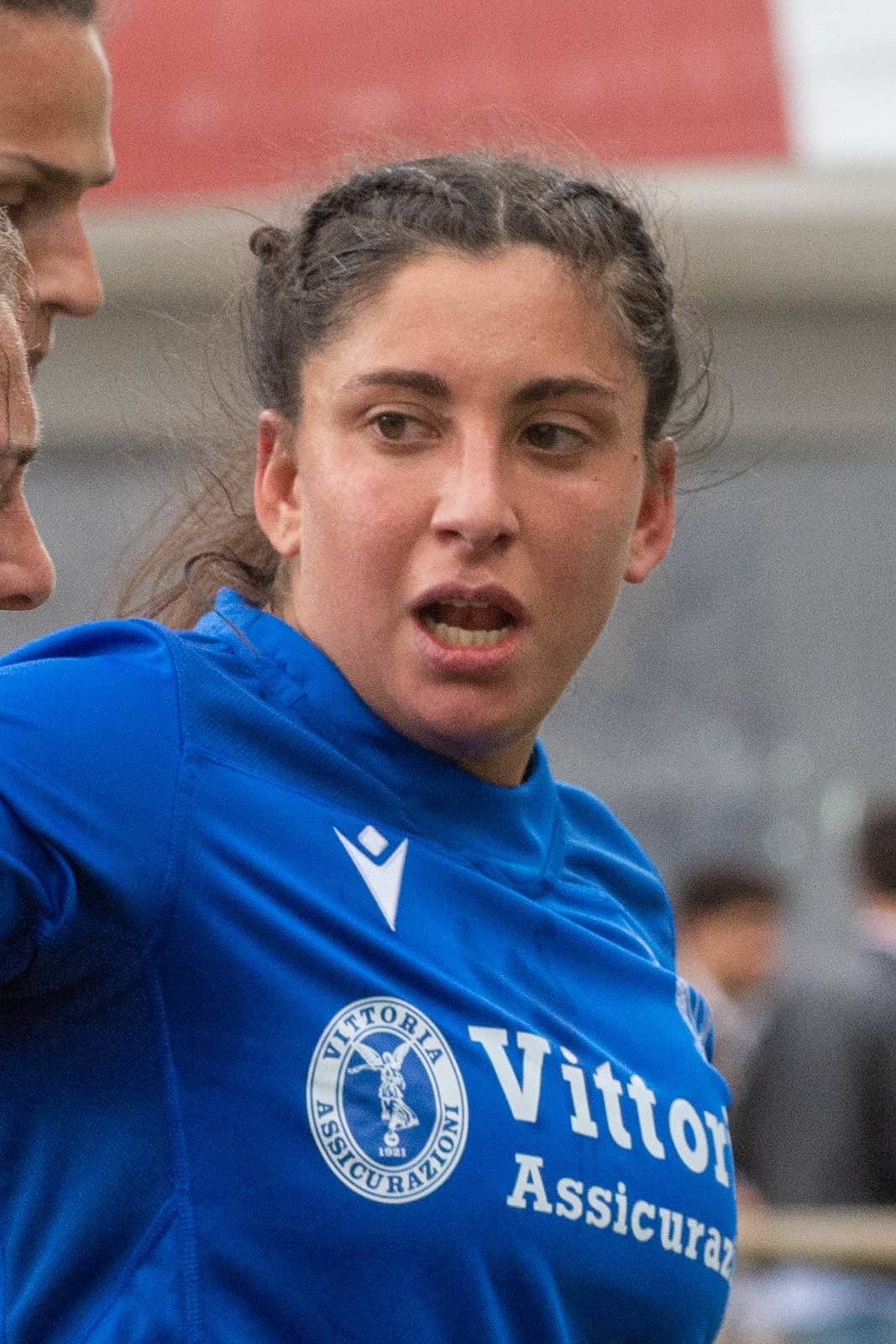
- Turani during the 2023 Six Nations match against France.
- Born: 6 July 1995 (age 31)
- Height: 170 cm (5 ft 7 in)
- Weight: 85 kg (187 lb; 13 st 5 lb)

Rugby union career
- Position: Prop
Senior career
Years	Team	Apps	(Points)
2016–2020	Colorno		(0)
2020–2021	Grenoble Amazons		(0)
2021–2022	Colorno		(0)
2022–2023	Exeter Chiefs	17	(0)
2023–	Harlequins		(0)
International career
Years	Team	Apps	(Points)
2017–	Italy	47	(25)

Silvia Turani (born 6 July 1995) is an Italian rugby union player. She plays Prop for Italy internationally, and for Harlequins in the Premiership Women's Rugby competition. She competed for Italy at the delayed 2021 Rugby World Cup.

== Rugby career ==
Turani hails from Grumello del Monte in the province of Bergamo in Italy, and is the daughter of a construction industrialist, she came into rugby relatively late; she discovered it as an exchange student in Cordova, Spain, when she participated in the Erasmus Programme from the University of Parma.

Having returned to Italy in 2016, she joined Colorno, which was the closest club to her university, and made her debut for the side in the 2016–2017 season. In 2017, she made her international debut for Italy in Biella against France, she came off the bench in the second half in place of Melissa Bettoni during their November test.

She was part of the Colorno side that won the 2017–2018 Serie A championship after beating Valsugana, who they lost to in the previous seasons final. In November 2019, she was the first Italian called up to the Women's Barbarians squad for a match against Wales at the Millennium Stadium.

Turani completed her management studies at the Grenoble School of Management in France, where she joined French club Grenoble Amazones for the 2020–2021 season. She then returned to Colorno for another season.

She was called up to the Italian squad for the delayed 2021 Rugby World Cup in New Zealand in October 2022. She was part of the first Italian side to reach the knockout stages of a women's or men's Rugby World Cup, she was also part of the first group of Italian female players to be given full-time contracts.

She signed a contract with English club, Exeter Chiefs, for the 2022–2023 season. She then moved to the Harlequins in 2023 and re-signed with the side in September 2024. She competed at the Six Nations tournament in 2024.

She was named in Italy's 34-player squad for the Women's Six Nations Championship on 5 March 2025. On 11 August, she was named in the Italian side to the Women's Rugby World Cup in England.
