= Rose Bernadou =

France international rugby union player

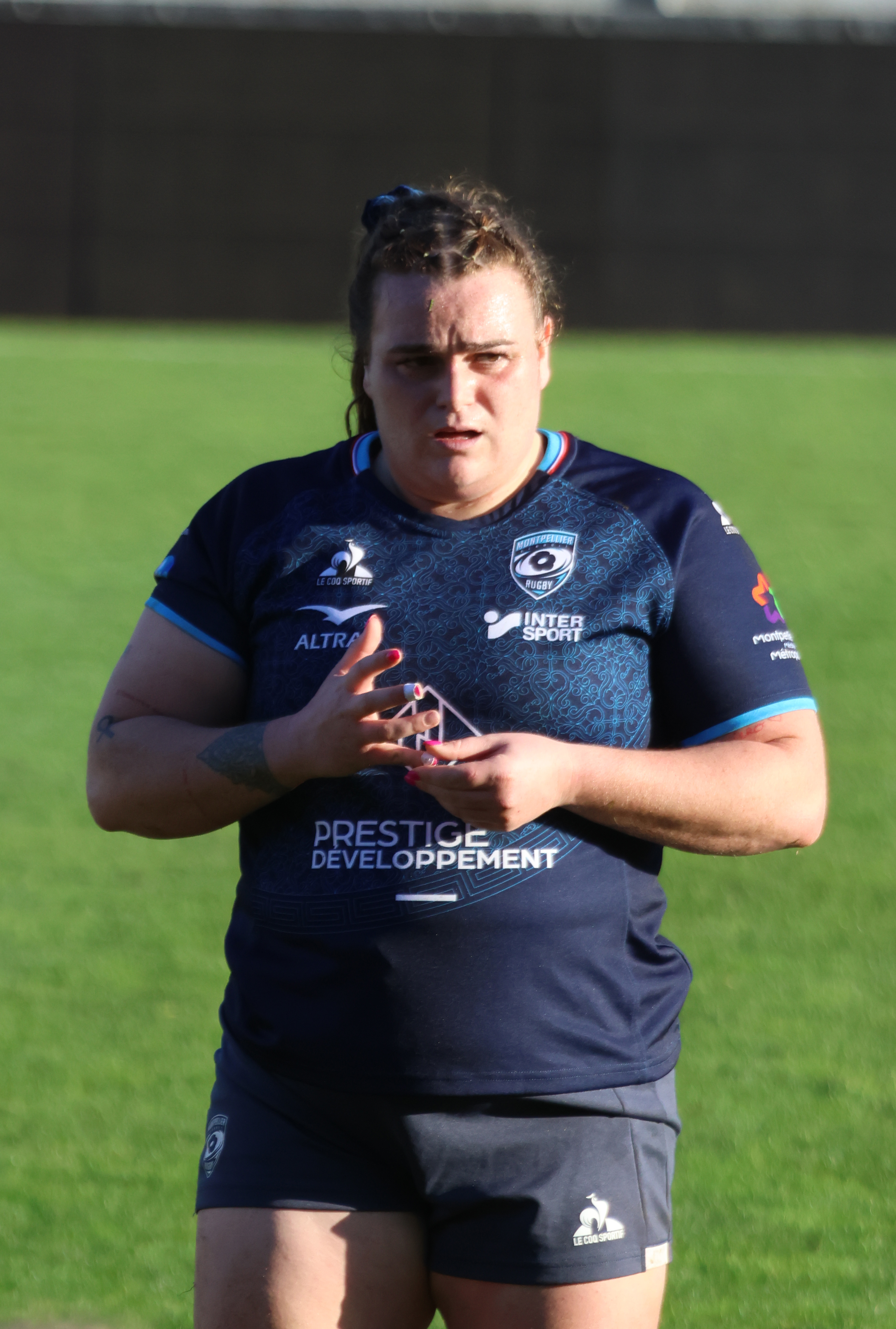
- Bernadou in 2024
- Born: 27 March 2000 (age 26)
- Height: 1.73 m (5 ft 8 in)

Rugby union career
- Position: Prop
Senior career
Years	Team	Apps	(Points)
2018–	Montpellier HR	50	(0)
International career
Years	Team	Apps	(Points)
2020–	France	28	(5)

Rose Bernadou (born 27 March 2000) is a French rugby union player. She plays for the France women's national rugby union team and Montpellier Hérault Rugby as a prop forward. She competed for France at the delayed 2021 Rugby World Cup.

== Rugby career ==
Bernadou began playing rugby at the age of 8 in Rives-d'Orb near Béziers. She studied in Toulouse before joining Montpellier Hérault Rugby aged 18. Bernadou made her international debut for France on 25 October 2020 against Scotland.

She was named in France's team for the delayed 2021 Rugby World Cup in New Zealand.

On 7 March 2025, she was named in France's squad for the Women's Six Nations Championship. On 2 August, she was selected in the French side to the Women's Rugby World Cup in England.
