= Alia Bitonci =

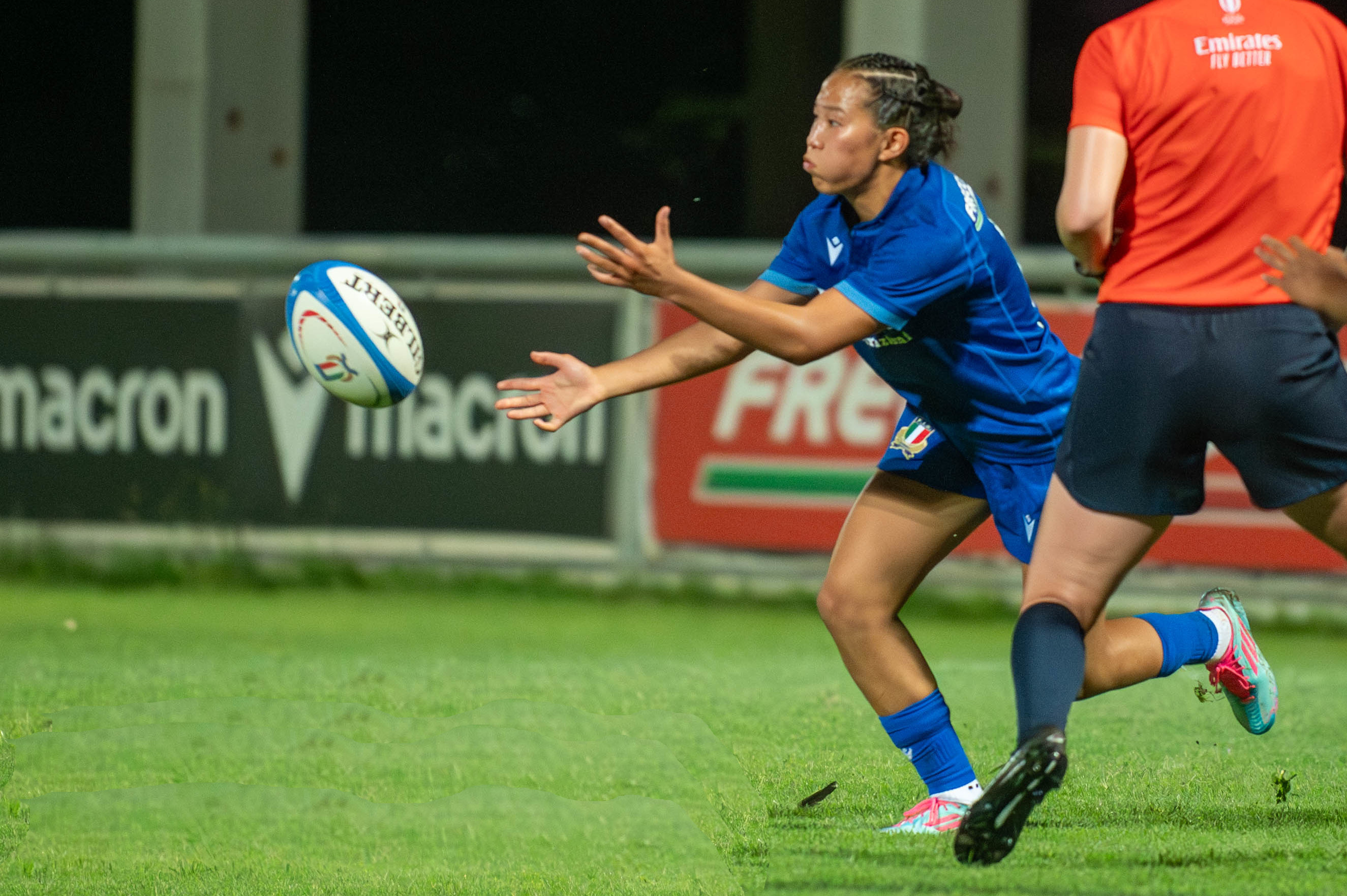
- Bitonci during a test match against Japan in 2025.
- Born: Alia Antonietta Bitonci; 27 March 2006 (age 20)
- Height: 163 cm (5 ft 4 in)
- Weight: 60 kg (132 lb; 9 st 6 lb)

Rugby union career
- Position: Scrum-half
Senior career
Years	Team	Apps	(Points)
2022–	Valsugana		(0)
International career
Years	Team	Apps	(Points)
2025–	Italy	10	(2)

Alia Bitonci (born 27 March 2006) is an Italian rugby union player. She competed for Italy in the 2025 Women's Rugby World Cup.

== Rugby career ==
Bitonci is the daughter of Italian politician Massimo Bitonci, who also played rugby in his youth. She grew up in Cittadella in Veneto; She took up sports at the age of 5, she later played for Valsugana's women's youth team, which was coached by current Italian international, Sofia Stefan.

Having already stood out in the Italian youth selections, she made her Serie A Élite debut at 17 with Valsugana, who became Italian champions in 2023. The following year she scored her first points of the competition during the 2024 tournament final, despite her side losing to Villorba. She was part of Italy's U-20 side that took part in the Summer Series of the 2024 U-20 Women's Six Nations.

During the 2025 Six Nations, she made her international debut for Italy against England in York. She got her first start for Italy against France in week four of the tournament. She appeared for Valsugana in their second consecutive championship final, although they lost again to Villorba. Her performances in the Serie A Élite earned her one of three nominations for Best Player of the 2024–25 championship season.

Bitonci was named in the Italian squad for the 2025 Women's Rugby World Cup in England.
