= Kelly Arbey =

France international rugby union player

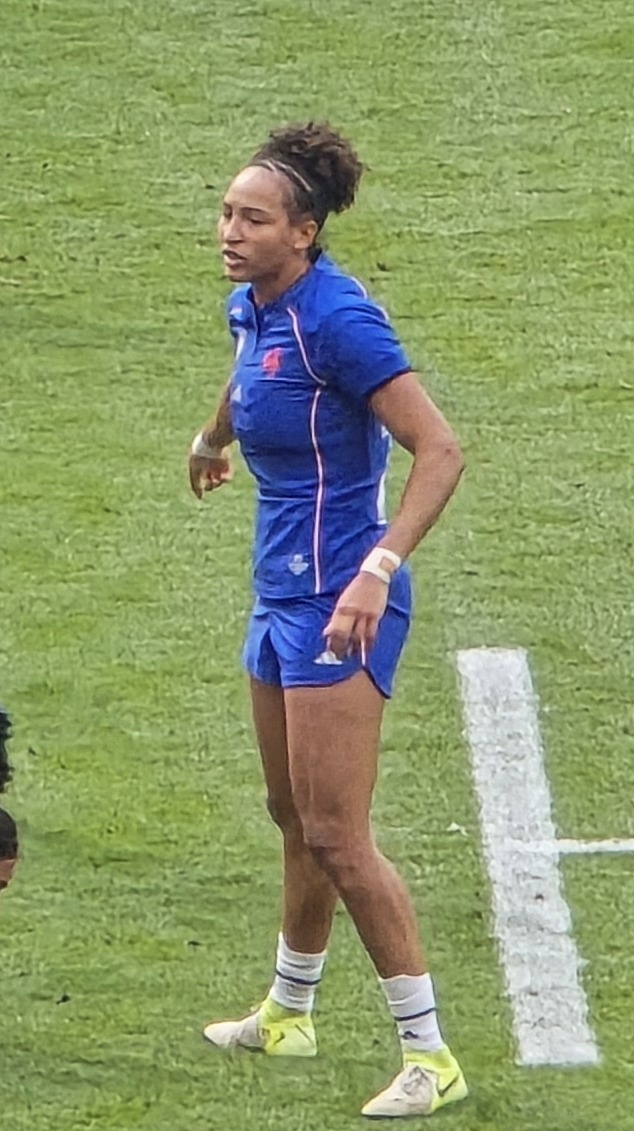
- 2025 Women's Rugby World Cup - New Zealand vs France
- Born: 9 May 2005 (age 21) France
- Height: 175 cm (5 ft 9 in)
- Weight: 72 kg (159 lb)

Rugby union career
- Position(s): Winger, full-back
Youth career
- -: RC Revélois
- –: Puylaurens AC
- –: Castres Olympique
Senior career
Years	Team	Apps	(Points)
2022–	Stade Toulousain		
International career
Years	Team	Apps	(Points)
2022–2023	France U18		
2024–	France	11	(25)
National sevens teams
Years	Team		Comps
2023	France U18 7s		
2024–	France 7s		

Kelly Arbey (born 9 May 2005) is a French rugby union and rugby sevens player. She plays as a wing and full-back for Stade Toulousain and the France national team.

== Early life ==
Kelly Arbey is originally from the Tarn region in southern France. She started playing rugby at the age of four, inspired by her older brother. She first played for RC Revélois, then moved to Puylaurens AC and Castres Olympique. By the age of seven, she had joined the rugby school at Castres Olympique.

She trained at the Pôle Espoirs at the Lycée de la Borde Basse in Castres, which offered a special schedule to balance studies and training. She later continued her development at the Pôle Espoir de Jolimont. In addition to rugby, she has also practiced football, judo, tennis, and climbing.

== Rugby career ==
=== Club career ===
==== Stade Toulousain (2022-present) ====
In 2022, Arbey signed with Stade Toulousain.

=== International career ===
==== Youth Teams ====
Arbey represented France in the U18 Six Nations Festival in both 2022 and 2023, winning the Grand Slam in both editions. In 2023, she also became European Champion with France U18 in rugby sevens.

==== Senior National Team ====
===== 2024 Women’s Six Nations Championship =====
In 2024, at just 18 years old, Arbey earned her first call-up to the French senior XV team for the Women's Six Nations Championship. She made her international debut as a starting winger in the opening match against Ireland.

===== 2025 Women's Six Nations Championship =====
Arbey was named in France's 32-player squad for the 2025 Women's Six Nations. She started on the right wing in the match against Scotland on 29 March 2025, won 38–15 by France. She then played against Wales, won 42–12 by France.

On 2 August, she was named in the French side to the 2025 Women's Rugby World Cup.

=== Rugby Sevens ===
Arbey joined the France Sevens squad for the 2024–2025 season. She competed in the 2024-2025 World Rugby SVNS Series, earning bronze medals at the Dubai, Cape Town, and Perth tournaments.
