= Vicky Elmes Kinlan =

Ireland international rugby union player (born 2003)

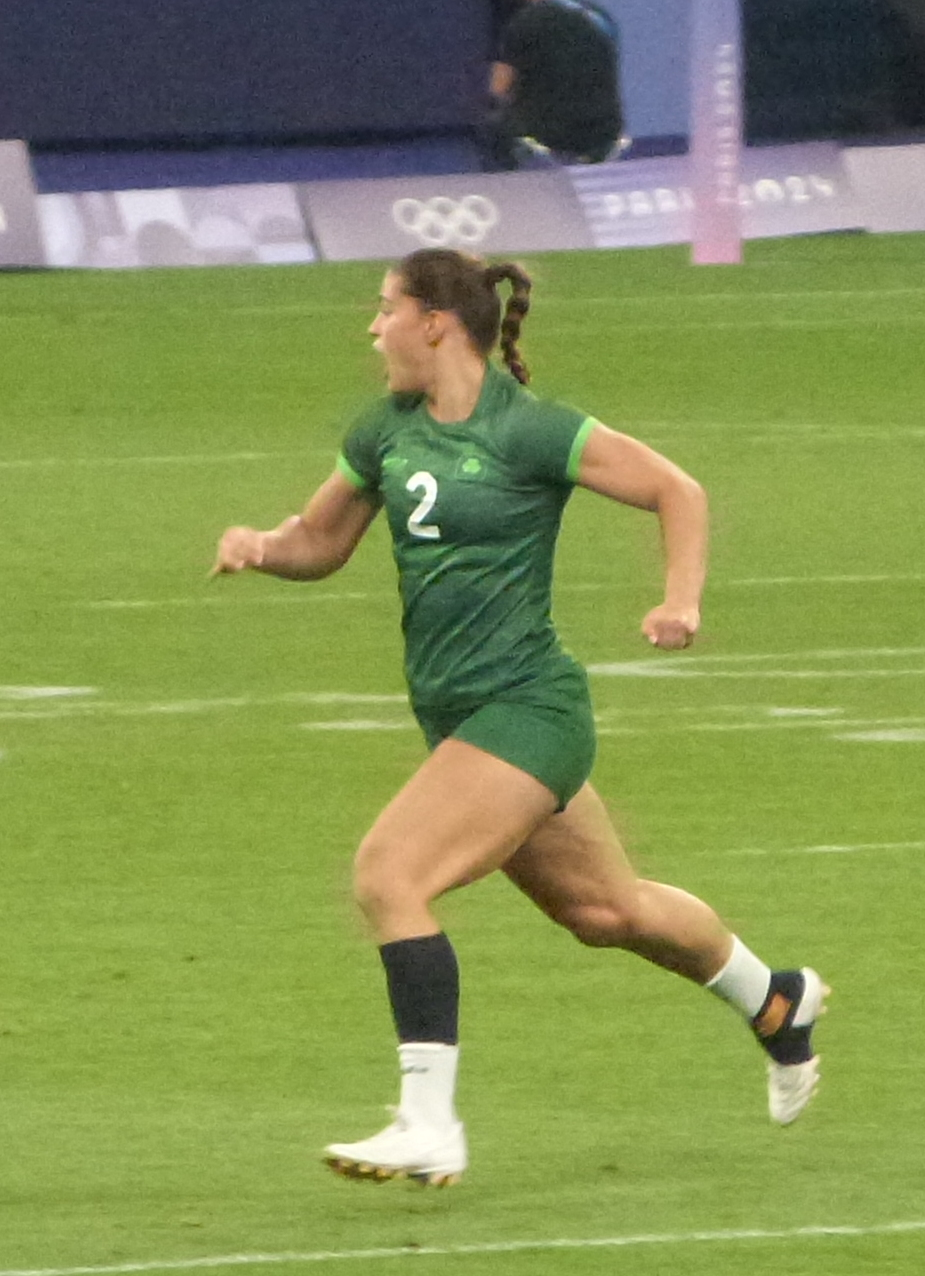
- Elmes Kinlan with Ireland at the 2024 Olympics
- Born: 21 February 2003 (age 23)
- Height: 1.70 m (5 ft 7 in)
- Weight: 72 kg (159 lb)

Rugby union career
- Current team: Wicklow RFC
International career
Years	Team	Apps	(Points)
2024–	Ireland	1	(0)
National sevens team
Years	Team		Comps
2022–	Ireland		

Vicky Elmes Kinlan (born 21 February 2003) is an Irish rugby union player. She was selected as part of the Ireland national rugby sevens team for the 2024 Paris Olympics.

== Career ==
She is from Rathnew and plays domestically for Wicklow RFC. She played for Ireland at underage level in Sevens and XVs and was called up to train with the senior Irish Sevens team for the first time in August 2021. She made her World Sevens debut in Canada in April 2022.

She played in the Irish sevens team that won their first ever World Series in Perth, Australia when they beat hosts Australia in January 2024. She was subsequently named in the Irish sevens team to play at the 2024 Paris Olympics.

Elmes Kinlan made her international fifteens debut for Ireland against Australia on 14 September 2024 at Kingspan Stadium in Belfast. She was also selected in the side to compete at the WXV1 tournament in Canada a few weeks later.

She was named in Ireland's squad for the 2025 Six Nations Championship in March. She continued with Ireland for their 2026 Six Nations Championship campaign.
