= Teani Feleu =

France international rugby union player

- Born: 19 December 2002 (age 23) Mâcon
- Height: 174 cm (5 ft 9 in)
- Notable relative: Manaé Feleu (sister)

Rugby union career
- Position(s): Back row, Centre
Senior career
Years	Team	Apps	(Points)
2020–	FC Grenoble Amazones		(0)
International career
Years	Team	Apps	(Points)
2024–Present	France	17	(10)

Teani Feleu (born 19 December 2002) is a French rugby union player who plays for FC Grenoble Amazones and the France women's national rugby union team.

== Early life ==
Born in Mâcon, she grew up on the Futuna Islands, to Valerie and Nisie. She has three siblings: Niue, Asia and Manaé Feleu. Her parents were the only physical education teachers on her island and they introduced rugby into the school and set up clubs to play matches. In her teenage years she studied in Hawke's Bay, New Zealand at Woodford House.

== Career ==
She has played for FC Grenoble Amazones since 2020. Teani joined the French rugby 7s team for a World Sevens Series and was named in the France women's national rugby union team for the 2023 Women's Six Nations Championship without making her debut.

She maintained her place in the France squad for the 2024 Women's Six Nations Championship. She made her debut in the championship against Scotland. The following week, she made her first start for France against Wales. For Grenoble she typically plays at outside centre, but on debut for France she was played at No 8.

On 7 March 2025, she was named in France's squad for the Six Nations Championship. In August, she was selected together with her sister, Manaé, in the French side to the 2025 Women's Rugby World Cup in England.

== Personal life ==
Feleu did dance and karate growing up. She moved to Grenoble in France with her sister Manaé in 2020. Their older brother Niue went on to play for Stade Dijonnais Côte D'Or in Nationale 2, the fourth tier of rugby union club competition division in France.
