= Fabio Roselli (rugby union) =

Italy international rugby union player & coach

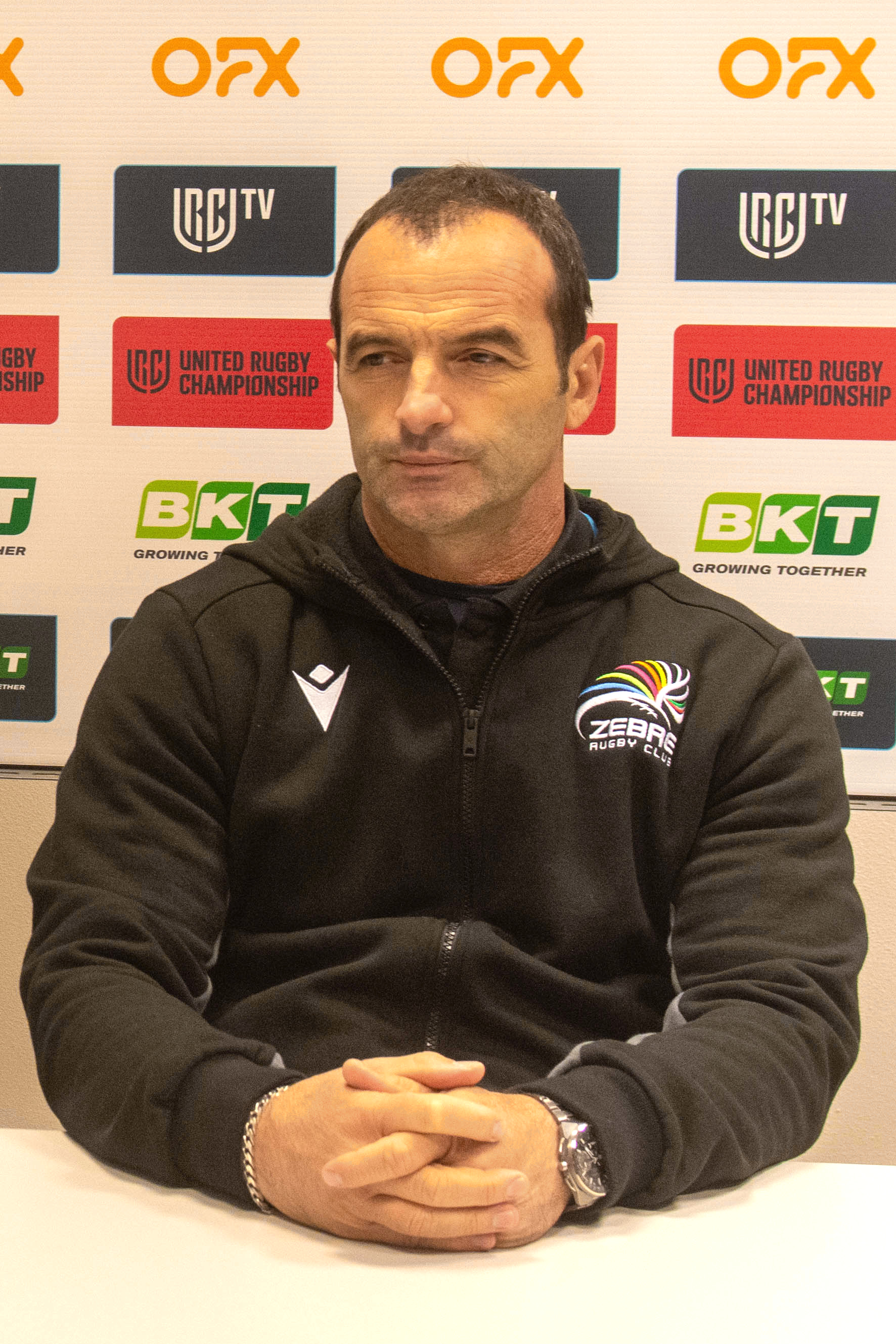
- Born: 13 April 1971 (age 55) Rome, Italy

Rugby union career
- Position: Wing
Senior career
Years	Team	Apps	(Points)
1989–2003	Rugby Roma Olimpic	-	(-)
International career
Years	Team	Apps	(Points)
1995–1999	Italy	16	(25)
Coaching career
- Years: Team
- 2024–: Italy women (Head Coach)
- 2022–2024: Zebre Parma (Head Coach)
- 2020–2022: Zebre Parma (Assistant Coach)
- 2008: Italy U-18 (Head Coach)

Fabio Roselli (born 13 April 1971 in Rome) is an Italian rugby union coach and former player. He previously coached Zebre Parma in the United Rugby Championship, until his recent appointment as Italy women's national rugby union team coach.

== Rugby career ==
Roselli played his entire career for Rugby Roma Olimpic, from 1989/90 to 2002/03. He won one Italian Championship, in 1999/2000, and one Cup of Italy, in 1997/98.

He had 16 caps for Italy, from 1995 to 1999, scoring 5 tries, 25 points in aggregate. He played a game at the 1999 Rugby World Cup, in what would be his final cap for his national team. He played as a wing.

=== Coaching career ===
Roselli was the coach of the Italy national U-18 team in 2008, and was then in charge of the Italy national U-17 team.

From 2020 to 2022 he was named as Assistant coach for Zebre Parma in the United Rugby Championship. He later became their Head coach from 2022 to 2024.

In December 2024 he was named head coach of the Italy women's national rugby union team.
