= FC Grenoble Amazones =

- Founded: 1986; 40 years ago
- Ground: Stade Lesdiguières
- President: Laurent Pélissier
- Coach: Léo Brissaud
- League: Élite 1
- 2024–25: 5th
1st kit	2nd kit

Official website
- www.fcgrugby.com

FC Grenoble Amazones are a French women's rugby union club, based in Sassenage, northwest of Grenoble. They compete in the Élite 1 competition, which is the top division of women's rugby in France. It was formed from the merger of Rugby Sassenage Isère with FC Grenoble in 2015.

== History ==
Rugby Sassenage Isère, commonly known as the Amazones de Sassenage, was founded in 1986. They celebrated their twentieth anniversary on 17 June 2006.

During the 2007–08 season, the club finished in the top three of Division 1B and was a finalist in the Armelle Auclair Challenge, facing RF Dijon Bourgogne in the final (13–13), losing on tries scored (1 try to 2). This resulted in promotion to the highest level, Division 1A.

In 2015, Rugby Sassenage Isère (Amazones) merged with FC Grenoble and became FC Grenoble Amazones. In 2018, they were crowned French Elite 2 Armelle-Auclair champions with a 6–5 victory against Lons RF, and were thus promoted to Élite 1.

Since March 2024, head coach Léo Brissaud has also been the backs coach for the French women's U20 team. In June 2025, Laurent Pélissier was appointed as the new president.

== Current squad ==
2025–26 Élite 1 season squad:

Note: Flags indicate national union under World Rugby eligibility rules. Players may hold more than one non-World Rugby nationality.

Player	Position	Union
Enoleen Brisa	Hooker	France
**Élisa Riffonneau**	Hooker	France
Iliana Acolatse	Prop	France
**Sydney De Weijer**	Prop	Netherlands
Agnes Nau	Prop	France
Suzanne Nicole	Prop	France
Naomi Osarosco	Prop	France
Clara Pellissier	Prop	France
**Manaé Feleu**	Lock	France
**Inger Jongerius**	Lock	Netherlands
Sana Lagrandeur	Lock	France
Bonnie Soqeta	Lock	France
**Oumou Barry**	Back row	Switzerland
**Léa Champon**	Back row	France
**Teani Feleu**	Back row	France
**Émeline Gros**	Back row	France
Lisa Jallifier	Back row	France
Ambre Laurent	Back row	France
**Taïna Maka**	Back row	France
Lou Mingolo	Back row	France
Maëva Pi	Back row	France
Chloé Soubeyrand	Back row	France

Player	Position	Union
Léanore Bely	Scrum-half	France
Justine Ogier	Scrum-half	France
Romane Pellegrini	Scrum-half	France
Florine Thiron	Fly-half	France
Maëlis Moreau	Centre	France
Enoé Neri	Centre	France
Faustine Piscicelli	Centre	France
Mayssa Salah	Centre	France
Aneymone Talalua	Centre	France
Violette Tournay	Centre	France
Clemence Berthet	Wing	France
Chloé Constantin	Wing	France
Océane Millot-Chevrey	Wing	France
Lou Noel	Wing	France
Julia Sakaël Perret	Wing	France
Aurora Bowie	Back	Canada
Cerise Moulin	Back	France
Enea Vey	Back	France

- Senior 15s internationally capped players are listed in **bold**.

== Honours ==
- Élite 2 Championship Armelle-Auclair
  - Champion (1): 2018
  - Finalist (1): 2008 (Rugby Sassenage Isère)
- Junior Championship
  - Champion (1): 2025.
- 7s Development Championship
  - Champion (1): 2017.
- Fédérale 2
  - Champion (1): 2019 (Reserve team)

== Coaches ==
Season	Sporting Director	Coach	Assistant
2016–2017	—	Emmanuel Pellorce	—
2017–2020	—	Emmanuel Pellorce	Cristian Spachuk
2020–2021	—	Emmanuel Pellorce	James Lakepa
2021–2023	Emmanuel Pellorce	Léo Brissaud	Nicolas Carella
2023–Present	Emmanuel Pellorce	Léo Brissaud	Jean-Noël Perrin (forwards)
