= Manaé Feleu =

France international rugby union player

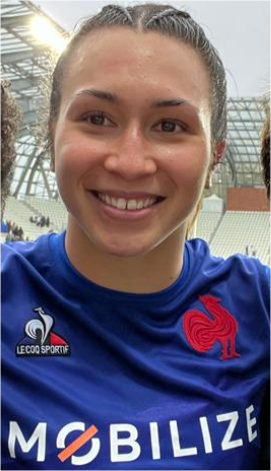
- Feleu with France in 2023
- Born: 3 February 2000 (age 26) Mâcon
- Height: 1.79 m (5 ft 10 in)
- Weight: 81 kg (179 lb)
- Notable relative: Teani Feleu (sister)

Rugby union career
- Position: Lock
Senior career
Years	Team	Apps	(Points)
2020–	FC Grenoble Amazones		(0)
International career
Years	Team	Apps	(Points)
2020–Present	France	30	(15)

Manaé Feleu (French: [mana.e fele.u]; born 3 February 2000) is a French rugby union player who plays for FC Grenoble Amazones and the France women's national rugby union team. She competed at the delayed 2021 Rugby World Cup.

== Personal life ==
Born in Mâcon, she grew up on the Futuna Islands, to Valérie and Nisie. She has three siblings: Niue, Teani Feleu, and Asia. Her parents were the only physical education teachers on her island and they introduced rugby into the school and set up clubs to play matches. From the age of 14 she studied in Hawke's Bay, New Zealand for three years at Woodford House.

Feleu moved to Grenoble with her sister Teani in 2020 to study medicine. She combines training to become a surgeon with rugby training.

== Rugby career ==
Feleu made her international debut for France against England in Grenoble on 14 November 2020 before being selected again a year later. She was named in France's team for the delayed 2021 Rugby World Cup in New Zealand. She featured in the games against South Africa and Fiji at the World Cup. Feleu was named in France's squad for the 2023 Women's Six Nations Championship. She captained the side at the 2024 tournament and scored her first try for the nation during the match against Wales.

Her performances for the France team during the 2025 Six Nations Championship led to her being named in the Team of the Championship and nominated for the overall Player of the Championship award alongside England winger Abby Dow, Ireland forward Aoife Wafer, and Scotland back-row Evie Gallagher.

On 2 August 2025, she was selected in the French side to the Women's Rugby World Cup in England. During the tournament, Feleu was banned for three matches following a dangerous tackle in the quarter final match against Ireland.
