= Yllana Brosseau =

France international rugby union player

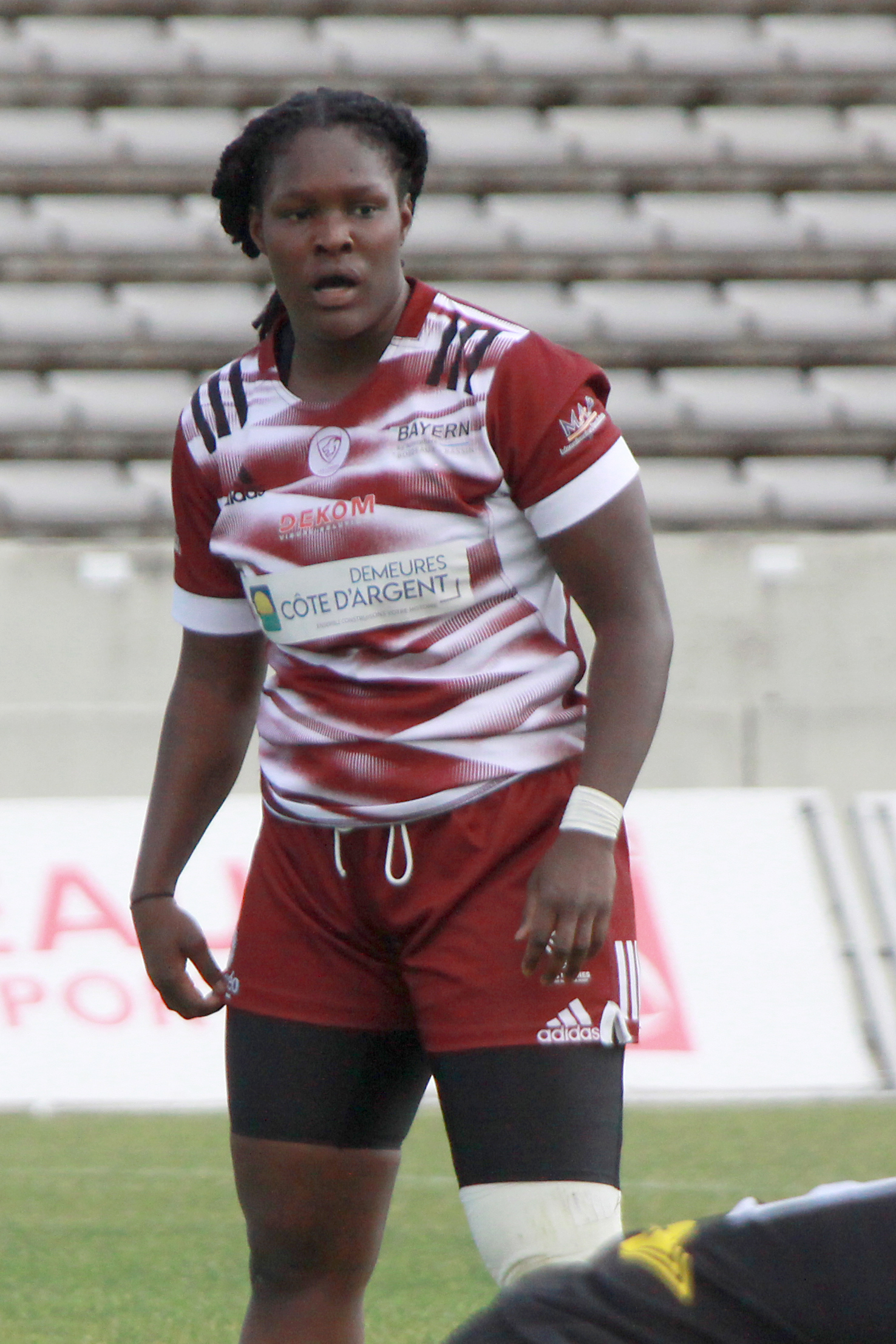
- Brosseau with Stade Bordelais in 2022
- Born: 5 September 2000 (age 26)
- Height: 176 cm (5 ft 9 in)

Rugby union career
- Position: Prop
Senior career
| Years | Team | Apps | (Points) |
| 2021– | Stade Bordelais | | (0) |
International career
| Years | Team | Apps | (Points) |
| 2020– | France | 27 | (0) |

Yllana Brosseau (born 5 September 2000) is a French rugby union player. She plays for the France women's national rugby union team as a prop forward, and for Stade Bordelais. She was a member of France's squad at the delayed 2021 Rugby World Cup.

== Rugby career ==
Brosseau joined Stade Bordelais in 2021 from AC Bobigny 93 Rugby although agreed to move back to Bobigny in 2022. She was named in France's team for the delayed 2021 Rugby World Cup in New Zealand.

On 7 March 2025, she was named in France's squad for the Women's Six Nations Championship. In August, she was selected in the French side to the 2025 Women's Rugby World Cup in England.
