= Emily Lane =

Ireland international rugby union player

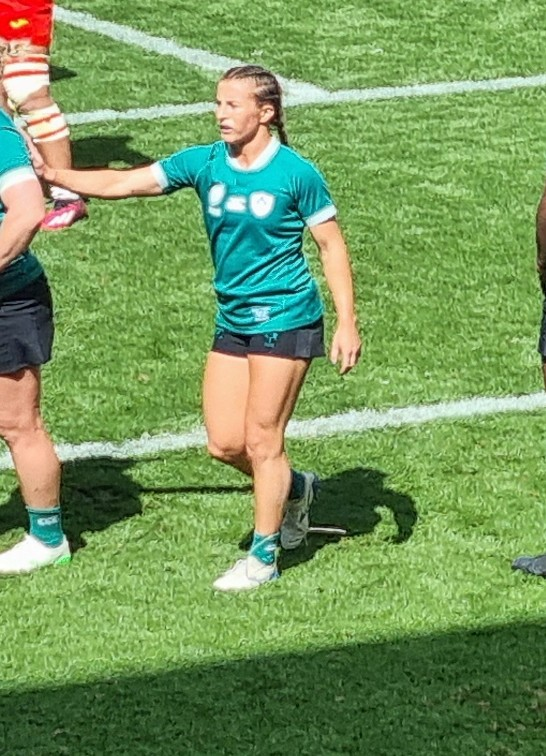
- 2025 Rugby World Cup in Northampton
- Born: 10 January 1999 (age 27) Cork, Ireland
- Height: 164 cm (5 ft 5 in)
- Weight: 167 kg (368 lb)

Rugby union career
- Position: Scrum half
Amateur team(s)
Years	Team	Apps	(Points)
	Mallow		(0)
	Ballincollig		(0)
Senior career
Years	Team	Apps	(Points)
2016	Munster		(0)
2020	Blackrock College		(0)
International career
Years	Team	Apps	(Points)
2020–	Ireland	20	(5)
- Correct as of 24 September 2025
National sevens team
Years	Team		Comps
2018–	Ireland 7s		42

Emily Lane (born 10 January 1999) is an Irish rugby player from Cork. She plays for Blackrock College RFC, Munster Rugby and the Ireland women's national rugby union team and the Ireland women's rugby sevens team.

== Club career ==
Lane first played rugby underage with Mallow RFC, a club that has also produced Ireland international Anna Caplice. She played for Ballincollig for one year while at UCC but moved to Dublin then where the Irish Sevens squad is based.

She joined All-Ireland League side Blackrock College RFC in 2020 but, up to then, most of her playing career, from 2018 to 2020 was in Sevens rugby as she got a sevens development contract with the Irish Rugby Football Union in 2018.

== International career ==
Lane impressed for the Munster Under-18s where she was in the same cohort as Irish teammate Enya Breen.

She got a professional development contract with the Ireland national women's sevens rugby team in late 2018 and made her debut in the Kazan in late 2018.

A senior sevens international since August 2018 she debuted for Ireland in a Rugby Europe tournament in Kazan, Russia in 2018 and has played on the World Rugby Sevens Series since.

Lane was part of the side that claimed fourth spot at the Sydney Sevens in 2019, their best finish to date on the World Series. She is amassed 42 international Sevens caps.

The cancellation of the World Sevens Series in 2020 due to Coronavirus gave her more opportunities at the 15s game.

She was one of five uncapped Sevens players selected for the Irish women's XVs for the 2021 Women's Six Nations where she was a replacement for Kathryn Dane in all three games - against Wales, France and Italy.

She represented Ireland at the 2024 Summer Olympics in Paris.

She was named in the Ireland's XV's side for the 2025 Six Nations Championship in March. She was selected in the Irish squad to the 2025 Rugby World Cup in England.

== Personal life ==
Lane is a biochemistry student at Trinity College Dublin. She shares a house with several rugby players, including international teammate Dorothy Wall.
