= 2024 Women's Six Nations Championship =

Women's rugby union competition

- Date: 23 March – 27 April 2024
- Countries: England; France; Ireland; Italy; Scotland; Wales

Tournament statistics
- Champions: England (20th title)
- Grand Slam: England (18th title)
- Triple Crown: England (24th title)
- Matches played: 15
- Attendance: 187,580 (12,505 per match)
- Tries scored: 107 (7.13 per match)
- Top point scorer: (England) Ellie Kildunne (45)
- Top try scorer: (England) Ellie Kildunne (9)
- Player of the tournament: (England) Ellie Kildunne
- Official website: Official website

The 2024 Women's Six Nations Championship, known as the Guinness Women's Six Nations for sponsorship purposes except in France where due to alcohol sponsorship prohibitions the tournament was unsponsored, was the 23rd series of the Women's Six Nations Championship, an annual women's rugby union competition featuring England, France, Ireland, Italy, Scotland and Wales. It began on 23 March and ended on 27 April 2024.

The competition was part of the qualification process for the 2025 World Cup, with a qualifying place awarded to the highest finisher other than England and France who had already qualified automatically for the tournament, by virtue of being among the top 4 teams at the previous World Cup. England also automatically qualified as hosts.

== Participants ==
Nation	Stadium			Coach	Captain	World Rugby Ranking	
Nation	Home stadium	Capacity	Location	Coach	Captain	Start (Note: As of 23 March 2024)	End (Note: As of 27 April 2024)
England	Ashton Gate	27,000	Bristol	(New Zealand) John Mitchell	Marlie Packer	1st	1st
England	Twickenham Stadium	82,000	London	(New Zealand) John Mitchell	Marlie Packer	1st	1st
France	Stade Marie-Marvingt	25,064	Le Mans	(France) Gaëlle Mignot (France) David Ortiz	Manaé Feleu	3rd	3rd
France	Stade Jean-Bouin	19,904	Paris	(France) Gaëlle Mignot (France) David Ortiz	Manaé Feleu	3rd	3rd
France	Stade Chaban-Delmas	34,462	Bordeaux	(France) Gaëlle Mignot (France) David Ortiz	Manaé Feleu	3rd	3rd
Ireland	RDS Arena	18,500	Dublin	(England) Scott Bemand	Edel McMahon; Sam Monaghan	10th	9th
Ireland	Musgrave Park	8,008	Cork	(England) Scott Bemand	Edel McMahon; Sam Monaghan	10th	9th
Ireland	Ravenhill Stadium	18,196	Belfast	(England) Scott Bemand	Edel McMahon; Sam Monaghan	10th	9th
Italy	Stadio Sergio Lanfranchi	5,000	Parma	(Italy) Giovanni Raineri	Elisa Giordano; Sofia Stefan	7th	8th
Scotland	Edinburgh Rugby Stadium	7,800	Edinburgh	(Scotland) Bryan Easson	Rachel Malcolm	8th	6th
Wales	Cardiff Arms Park	12,125	Cardiff	(Wales) Ioan Cunningham	Hannah Jones	6th	7th
Wales	Millennium Stadium	73,931	Cardiff	(Wales) Ioan Cunningham	Hannah Jones	6th	7th

== Table ==
Pos	Team	Pld	W	D	L	PF	PA	PD	TF	TA	GS	TB	LB	Pts	ENG	FRA	IRE	SCO	ITA	WAL
1	England	5	5	0	0	270	41	+229	44	5	3	5	0	28	—		88–10			46–10
2	France	5	4	0	1	152	79	+73	22	11	0	3	0	19	21–42	—	38–17		38–15	
3	Ireland	5	2	0	3	99	170	−71	13	26	0	1	1	10			—	15–12	21–27	36–5
4	Scotland	5	2	0	3	54	104	−50	8	15	0	0	1	9	0–46	5–15		—		
5	Italy	5	1	0	4	72	146	−74	10	23	0	1	2	7	0–48			10–17	—	
6	Wales	5	1	0	4	55	162	−107	7	24	0	0	1	5		0–40		18–20	22–20	—

Source: Women's Six Nations
Legend: Blue = home team win; Yellow = draw; Red = away team win.

Table ranking rules

- Four points are awarded for a win.
- Two points are awarded for a draw.
- A bonus point is awarded to a team that scores four or more tries, or loses by seven points or fewer.
- Three bonus points are awarded to a team that wins all five of their matches (a Grand Slam). This ensures that a Grand Slam winning team would top the table with at least 23 points, as another team could lose one match while winning two bonus points and win the other four matches while winning four bonus points for a maximum of 22 points.
- Tiebreakers
  - If two or more teams are tied on table points, the team with the better points difference (points scored against points conceded) is ranked higher.
  - If the above tiebreaker fails to separate tied teams, the team that scores the higher number of total tries (including penalty tries) in their matches is ranked higher.
  - If two or more teams remain tied after applying the above tiebreakers then those teams will be placed at equal rank; if the tournament has concluded and more than one team is placed first then the title will be shared between them.

== Fixtures ==
=== Round 1 ===
23 March 2024
14:15 CET (UTC+1)

(1 BP) France	38–17	Ireland
Try: Sansus 3' c M. Ménager 32' c Fall Raclot 47' c Sochat 62' c Riffonneau 75' c Con: Queyroi (4/4) 4', 34', 49', 63'; Bourgeois (1/1) 77'; Pen: Queyroi (1/1) 38'	Report	Try: Wafer 71' c Dalton 78' c Con: O'Brien (2/2) 72', 77'; Pen: Fowley (1/1) 14'

Stade Marie-Marvingt, Le Mans
Attendance: 15,559
Referee: Kat Roche (United States)

FB	15	Émilie Boulard
RW	14	Kelly Arbey
OC	13	Nassira Konde
IC	12	Gabrielle Vernier
LW	11	Marine Ménager	(substituted off) 44'
FH	10	Lina Queyroi	(substituted off) 72'
SH	9	Pauline Bourdon Sansus	(substituted off) 61'
N8	8	Romane Ménager
OF	7	Gaëlle Hermet
BF	6	Charlotte Escudero
RL	5	Madoussou Fall Raclot	(substituted off) 51'
LL	4	Manaé Feleu (c)	(substituted off) 67'
TP	3	Assia Khalfaoui	(substituted off) 65'
HK	2	Agathe Sochat	(substituted off) 65'
LP	1	Annaëlle Deshayes	(substituted off) 56'
Replacements:
HK	16	Élisa Riffonneau	(substituted on) 65'
PR	17	Ambre Mwayembe	(substituted on) 56'
PR	18	Clara Joyeux	(substituted on) 65'
LK	19	Kiara Zago	(substituted on) 67'
FL	20	Émeline Gros	(substituted on) 51'
SH	21	Alexandra Chambon	(substituted on) 61'
CE	22	Lina Tuy	(substituted on) 72'
FB	23	Morgane Bourgeois	(substituted on) 44'
Coach:
(France) Gaëlle Mignot (France) David Ortiz

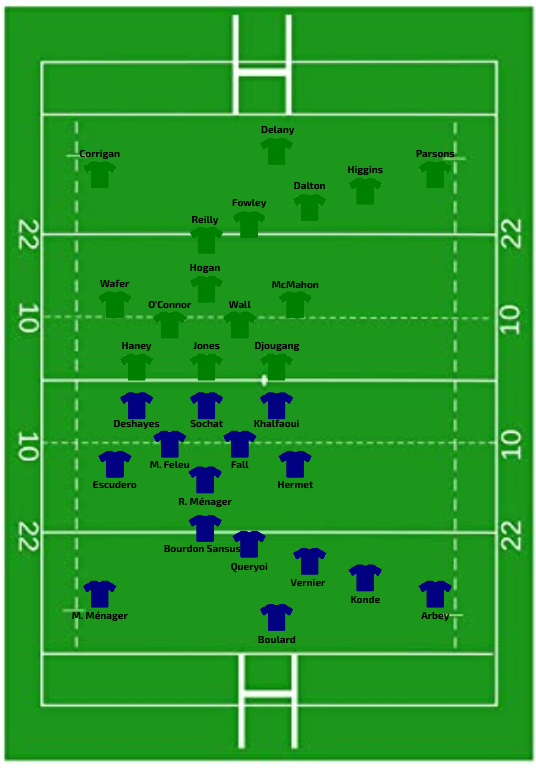

FB	15	Lauren Delany
RW	14	Katie Corrigan	(substituted off) 67'
OC	13	Eve Higgins
IC	12	Aoife Dalton
LW	11	Beibhinn Parsons
FH	10	Nicole Fowley	(substituted off) 40'
SH	9	Aoibheann Reilly	(substituted off) 63'
N8	8	Brittany Hogan
OF	7	Edel McMahon (c)	(substituted off) 70'
BF	6	Aoife Wafer	(substituted off) 77'
RL	5	Hannah O'Connor
LL	4	Dorothy Wall	(substituted off) 56'
TP	3	Christy Haney	(substituted off) 63'
HK	2	Neve Jones
LP	1	Linda Djougang	(substituted off) 77'
Replacements:
HK	16	Sarah Delaney	(substituted on) 77'
PR	17	Niamh O'Dowd	(substituted on) 77'
PR	18	Sadhbh McGrath	(substituted on) 63'
LK	19	Fiona Tuite	(substituted on) 56'
FL	20	Grace Moore	(substituted on) 51'
SH	21	Molly Scuffil-McCabe	(substituted on) 63'
FH	22	Dannah O'Brien	(substituted on) 40'
FB	23	Méabh Deely	(substituted on) 67'
Coach:
(England) Scott Bemand

Player of the Match:
Madoussou Fall Raclot (France)

Assistant referees:
Adele Robert (Belgium)
Maria Latos (Germany)
Television match official:
Quinton Immelman (South Africa)

Notes:

- Katie Corrigan (Ireland) and Lina Tuy (France) made their international debuts.

23 March 2024
16:45 GMT (UTC+0)

(1 BP) Wales	18–20	Scotland
Try: Tuipulotu 59' c Callender 79' m Con: Bevan (1/1) 60'; Pen: Bevan (2/2) 6', 40' +1	Report	Try: Grant 7' c Lloyd 49' c Con: Nelson (2/2) 8', 50'; Pen: Nelson (2/2) 16', 74'

Cardiff Arms Park, Cardiff
Attendance: 5,965
Referee: Clara Munarini (Italy)

FB	15	Jenny Hesketh
RW	14	Jasmine Joyce-Butchers
OC	13	Hannah Jones (c)
IC	12	Kerin Lake
LW	11	Nel Metcalfe	(substituted off) 55'
FH	10	Lleucu George
SH	9	Keira Bevan	(substituted off) 74'
N8	8	Bethan Lewis
OF	7	Alex Callender
BF	6	Alisha Joyce-Butchers	(substituted off) 62'
RL	5	Abbie Fleming
LL	4	Natalia John	(substituted off) 40'
TP	3	Sisilia Tuipulotu	(substituted off) 67'
HK	2	Kelsey Jones	(substituted off) 67'
LP	1	Gwenllian Pyrs
Replacements:
HK	16	Carys Phillips	(substituted on) 67'
PR	17	Abbey Constable
PR	18	Donna Rose	(substituted on) 67'
LK	19	Georgia Evans	(substituted on) 40'
FL	20	Kate Williams	(substituted on) 62'
SH	21	Sian Jones
FH	22	Niamh Terry	(substituted on) 74'
WG	23	Carys Cox	(substituted on) 55'
Coach:
(Wales) Ioan Cunningham

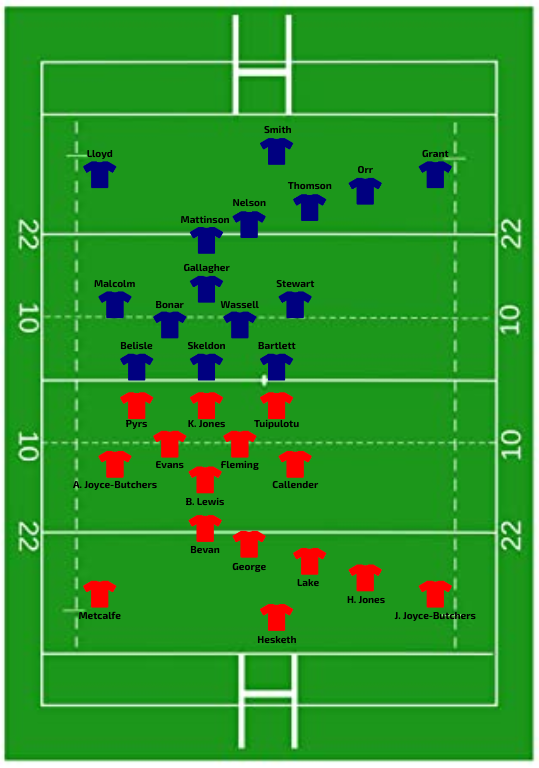

FB	15	Meryl Smith		(substituted off) 76'
RW	14	Rhona Lloyd
OC	13	Emma Orr
IC	12	Lisa Thomson
LW	11	Coreen Grant
FH	10	Helen Nelson
SH	9	Caity Mattinson
N8	8	Evie Gallagher
OF	7	Alex Stewart	(yellow card) 78'
BF	6	Rachel Malcolm (c)
RL	5	Sarah Bonar		(substituted off) 69'
LL	4	Emma Wassell
TP	3	Christine Belisle		(substituted off) 61'
HK	2	Lana Skeldon		(substituted off) 61'
LP	1	Leah Bartlett		(substituted off) 74'
Replacements:
HK	16	Elis Martin		(substituted on) 61'
PR	17	Molly Wright		(substituted on) 74'
PR	18	Elliann Clarke		(substituted on) 61'
LK	19	Louise McMillan		(substituted on) 69'
FL	20	Eva Donaldson
SH	21	Mairi McDonald
WG	22	Shona Campbell
FB	23	Chloe Rollie		(substituted on) 75'
Coach:
(Scotland) Bryan Easson

Player of the Match:
Coreen Grant (Scotland)

Assistant referees:
Sara Cox (England)
Holly Wood (England)
Television match official:
Leo Colgan (Ireland)

Notes:

- Jenny Hesketh and Sian Jones (both Wales) made their international debuts.
- Alex Stewart (Scotland) made her international debut.
- Scotland won their seventh consecutive test, making this their longest winning streak in terms of games played, surpassing the six successive victories between 1997 and 1998.

24 March 2024
15:00 CET (UTC+1)

Italy	0–48	England (1 BP)
	Report	Try: Botterman 31' m Ward 36' m Atkin-Davies 45' m Kildunne (2) 50' c, 71' m Rowland 54' c Carson 61' c Powell 80' +2 c Con: Harrison (3/6) 52', 55', 62'; Aitchison (1/2) 80' +3

Stadio Sergio Lanfranchi, Parma
Attendance: 3,600
Referee: Aurélie Groizeleau (France)

FB	15	Vittoria Ostuni Minuzzi
RW	14	Aura Muzzo
OC	13	Michela Sillari		(substituted off) 16'
IC	12	Beatrice Rigoni
LW	11	Alyssa D'Incà
FH	10	Veronica Madia
SH	9	Sofia Stefan (c)		(substituted off) 60'
N8	8	Giulia Cavina		(substituted off) 63'
OF	7	Francesca Sgorbini		(substituted off) 58'
BF	6	Isabella Locatelli
RL	5	Sara Tounesi		(substituted off) 58'
LL	4	Valeria Fedrighi		(substituted off) 55'
TP	3	Sara Seye
HK	2	Silvia Turani		(substituted off) 60'
LP	1	Gaia Maris		(substituted off) 60'
Replacements:
HK	16	Laura Gurioli		(substituted on) 60'
PR	17	Emanuela Stecca		(substituted on) 60'
PR	18	Lucia Gai		(substituted on) 63'
LK	19	Alessia Pilani		(substituted on) 58'
FL	20	Giordana Duca		(substituted on) 58'
FL	21	Alessandra Frangipani		(substituted on) 55'
CE	22	Emma Stevanin	(yellow card) 80+1'	(substituted on) 16'
WG	23	Francesca Granzotto		(substituted on) 60'
Coach:
(Italy) Giovanni Raineri

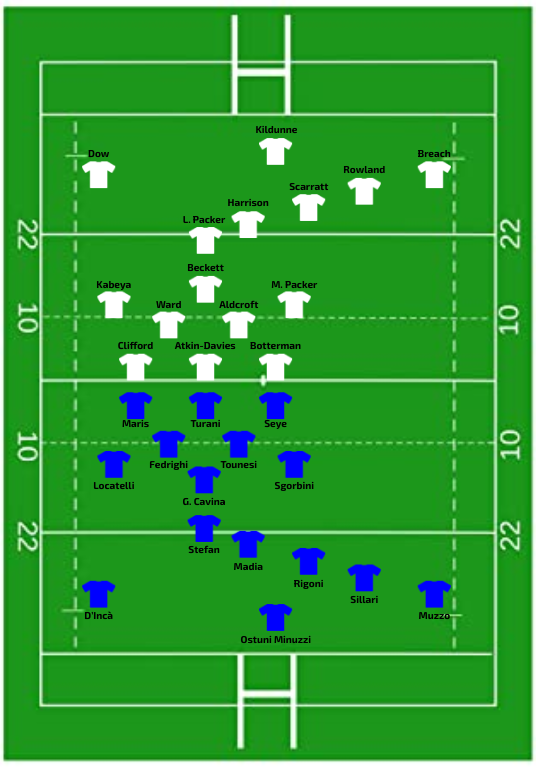

FB	15	Ellie Kildunne
RW	14	Abby Dow
OC	13	Helena Rowland	(yellow card) 69'
IC	12	Emily Scarratt		(substituted off) 52'
LW	11	Jess Breach
FH	10	Zoe Harrison		(substituted off) 62'
SH	9	Lucy Packer		(substituted off) 55'
N8	8	Sarah Beckett	(red card) 12'
OF	7	Marlie Packer (c)		(substituted off) 60'
BF	6	Sadia Kabeya		(substituted off) 60'
RL	5	Abbie Ward
LL	4	Zoe Aldcroft
TP	3	Kelsey Clifford		(substituted off) 52'
HK	2	Lark Atkin-Davies		(substituted off) 52'
LP	1	Hannah Botterman		(substituted off) 52'
Replacements:
HK	16	Connie Powell		(substituted on) 52'
PR	17	Mackenzie Carson		(substituted on) 52'
PR	18	Maud Muir		(substituted on) 52'
FL	19	Maddie Feaunati		(substituted on) 60'
FL	20	Alex Matthews		(substituted on) 60'
SH	21	Natasha Hunt		(substituted on) 55'
FH	22	Holly Aitchison		(substituted on) 52'
CE	23	Megan Jones		(substituted on) 62'
Coach:
(New Zealand) John Mitchell

Player of the Match:
Ellie Kildunne (England)

Assistant referees:
Doriane Domenjo (France)
Melissa Leboeuf (France)
Television match official:
Chris Assmus (Canada)

Notes:

- Maddie Feaunati (England) made her international debut.
- Marlie Packer became the 7th Englishwoman to earn her 100th test cap.

=== Round 2 ===
30 March 2024
14:15 GMT (UTC+0)

Scotland	5–15	France
Try: Martin 35' m	Report	Try: Arbey 53' m Gros 80' +1 c Con: Queyroi (1/2) 80' +2; Pen: Queyroi (1/1) 14'

Edinburgh Rugby Stadium, Edinburgh
Attendance: 5,000
Referee: Sara Cox (England)

FB	15	Meryl Smith	(substituted off) 52'
RW	14	Rhona Lloyd
OC	13	Emma Orr
IC	12	Lisa Thomson
LW	11	Coreen Grant
FH	10	Helen Nelson
SH	9	Caity Mattinson	(substituted off) 63'
N8	8	Evie Gallagher
OF	7	Alex Stewart
BF	6	Rachel Malcolm (c)
RL	5	Louise McMillan
LL	4	Emma Wassell
TP	3	Christine Belisle	(substituted off) 63'
HK	2	Elis Martin	(substituted off) 52'
LP	1	Leah Bartlett	(substituted off) 66'
Replacements:
HK	16	Molly Wright	(substituted on) 51'
PR	17	Lisa Cockburn	(substituted on) 66'
PR	18	Elliann Clarke	(substituted on) 63'
LK	19	Fiona McIntosh
FL	20	Eva Donaldson
SH	21	Mairi McDonald	(substituted on) 63'
CE	22	Nicole Flynn
FB	23	Chloe Rollie	(substituted on) 52'
Coach:
(Scotland) Bryan Easson

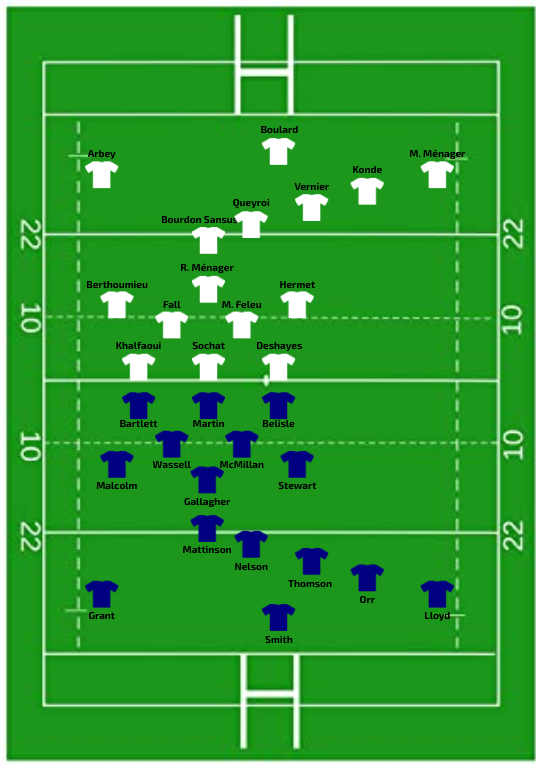

FB	15	Émilie Boulard
RW	14	Kelly Arbey
OC	13	Nassira Konde
IC	12	Gabrielle Vernier	28' to 38'
LW	11	Marine Ménager
FH	10	Lina Queyroi
SH	9	Pauline Bourdon Sansus	(substituted off) 61'
N8	8	Romane Ménager
OF	7	Gaëlle Hermet	(substituted off) 64'
BF	6	Axelle Berthoumieu	(substituted off) 57'
RL	5	Madoussou Fall Raclot
LL	4	Manaé Feleu (c)
TP	3	Assia Khalfaoui	(substituted off) 66'
HK	2	Agathe Sochat	(substituted off) 71'
LP	1	Annaëlle Deshayes	(substituted off) 52'
Replacements:
HK	16	Manon Bigot	(substituted on) 71'
PR	17	Ambre Mwayembe	(substituted on) 52'
PR	18	Clara Joyeux	(substituted on) 66'
FL	19	Charlotte Escudero	(substituted on) 57'
N8	20	Émeline Gros	(substituted on) 64'
SH	21	Alexandra Chambon	(substituted on) 60'
CE	22	Lina Tuy
FB	23	Morgane Bourgeois	(substituted on) 28'	(substituted off) 38'
Coach:
(France) Gaëlle Mignot (France) David Ortiz

Player of the Match:
Romane Ménager (France)

Assistant referees:
Holly Wood (England)
Adele Robert (Belgium)
Television match official:
Ian Tempest (England)

Notes:

- Louise McMillan (Scotland) earned her 50th test cap.

30 March 2024
16:45 GMT (UTC+0)

(1 BP) England	46–10	Wales
Try: Muir 8' m Aldcroft 15' c Botterman 24' c Atkin-Davies 40' +2 m Kildunne (2) 43' m, 62' m Dow 46' m Galligan 58' c Con: Aitchison (3/8) 16', 25', 59'	Report	Try: Bevan 54' c Con: George (1/1) 55'; Pen: George (1/1) 5'

Ashton Gate, Bristol
Attendance: 19,705
Referee: Kat Roche (United States)

FB	15	Ellie Kildunne
RW	14	Abby Dow
OC	13	Megan Jones
IC	12	Tatyana Heard	(substituted off) 66'
LW	11	Jess Breach	(substituted off) 60'
FH	10	Holly Aitchison
SH	9	Natasha Hunt	(substituted off) 66'
N8	8	Alex Matthews
OF	7	Marlie Packer (c)	(substituted off) 60'
BF	6	Sadia Kabeya
RL	5	Rosie Galligan
LL	4	Zoe Aldcroft	(substituted off) 60'
TP	3	Maud Muir	(substituted off) 53'
HK	2	Lark Atkin-Davies	(substituted off) 40'
LP	1	Hannah Botterman	(substituted off) 63'
Replacements:
HK	16	Connie Powell	(substituted on) 40'
PR	17	Mackenzie Carson	(substituted on) 63'
PR	18	Kelsey Clifford	(substituted on) 53'
LK	19	Abbie Ward	(substituted on) 60'
FL	20	Maddie Feaunati	(substituted on) 60'
SH	21	Lucy Packer	(substituted on) 66'
FH	22	Zoe Harrison	(substituted on) 66'
CE	23	Sydney Gregson	(substituted on) 60'
Coach:
(New Zealand) John Mitchell

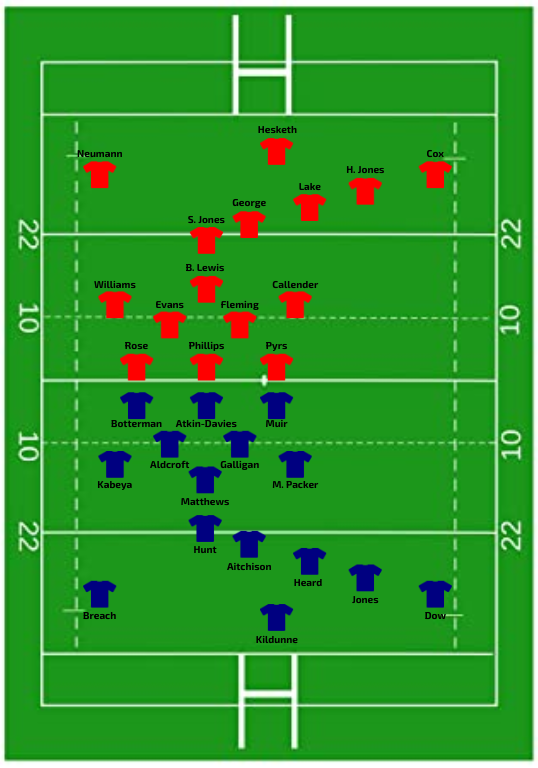

FB	15	Jenny Hesketh
RW	14	Lisa Neumann
OC	13	Hannah Jones (c)
IC	12	Kerin Lake	(substituted off) 64'
LW	11	Carys Cox
FH	10	Lleucu George	(substituted off) 71'
SH	9	Sian Jones	(substituted off) 48'
N8	8	Bethan Lewis	(substituted off) 40'
OF	7	Alex Callender
BF	6	Kate Williams	(substituted off) 53'
RL	5	Georgia Evans
LL	4	Abbie Fleming
TP	3	Donna Rose	(substituted off) 40'
HK	2	Carys Phillips	(substituted off) 73'
LP	1	Gwenllian Pyrs	(substituted off) 59'
Replacements:
HK	16	Molly Reardon	(substituted on) 73'
PR	17	Abbey Constable	(substituted on) 59'
PR	18	Sisilia Tuipulotu	(substituted on) 40'
LK	19	Natalia John	(substituted on) 53'
FL	20	Alisha Joyce-Butchers	(substituted on) 40'
SH	21	Keira Bevan	(substituted on) 48'
FB	22	Kayleigh Powell	(substituted on) 71'
FB	23	Courtney Keight	(substituted on) 64'
Coach:
(Wales) Ioan Cunningham

Player of the Match:
Rosie Galligan (England)

Assistant referees:
Aurélie Groizeleau (France)
Doriane Domenjo (France)
Television match official:
Quinton Immelman (South Africa)

Notes:

- Molly Reardon (Wales) made her international debut.
- Zoe Aldcroft (England) earned her 50th test cap.
- Jasmine Joyce-Butchers, Kelsey Jones, and Nel Metcalfe were originally named in the respectively in the Welsh starting line-up on the wing, bench at hooker and bench on the wing, but withdrew before the match due to injuries. They were replaced by Lisa Neumann, Molly Reardon, and Courtney Keight respectively.

31 March 2024
15:00 IST (UTC+1)

(1 BP) Ireland	21–27	Italy (1 BP)
Try: Penalty try 8'; Jones 62' c Corrigan 79' c Con: O'Brien (2/2) 63', 79'	Report	Try: Vecchini (2) 25' m, 57' c Fedrighi 33' c Muzzo 69' m Con: Rigoni (2/4) 34', 58'; Pen: Rigoni (1/1) 36'

RDS Arena, Dublin
Attendance: 6,605
Referee: Hollie Davidson (Scotland)

FB	15	Lauren Delany	(substituted off) 36'
RW	14	Katie Corrigan
OC	13	Eve Higgins
IC	12	Enya Breen	(substituted off) 59'
LW	11	Beibhinn Parsons
FH	10	Dannah O'Brien
SH	9	Aoibheann Reilly	(substituted off) 59'
N8	8	Brittany Hogan
OF	7	Aoife Wafer
BF	6	Grace Moore	(substituted off) 55'
RL	5	Sam Monaghan
LL	4	Dorothy Wall	(substituted off) 67'
TP	3	Christy Haney	(substituted off) 63'
HK	2	Neve Jones
LP	1	Linda Djougang	(substituted off) 77'
Replacements:
HK	16	Sarah Delaney
PR	17	Niamh O'Dowd	(substituted on) 77'
PR	18	Sadhbh McGrath	(substituted on) 63'
LK	19	Fiona Tuite	(substituted on) 55'
FL	20	Eimear Corri	(substituted on) 67'
SH	21	Molly Scuffil-McCabe	(substituted on) 59'
FH	22	Nicole Fowley	(substituted on) 36'
CE	23	Aoife Dalton	(substituted on) 59'
Coach:
(England) Scott Bemand

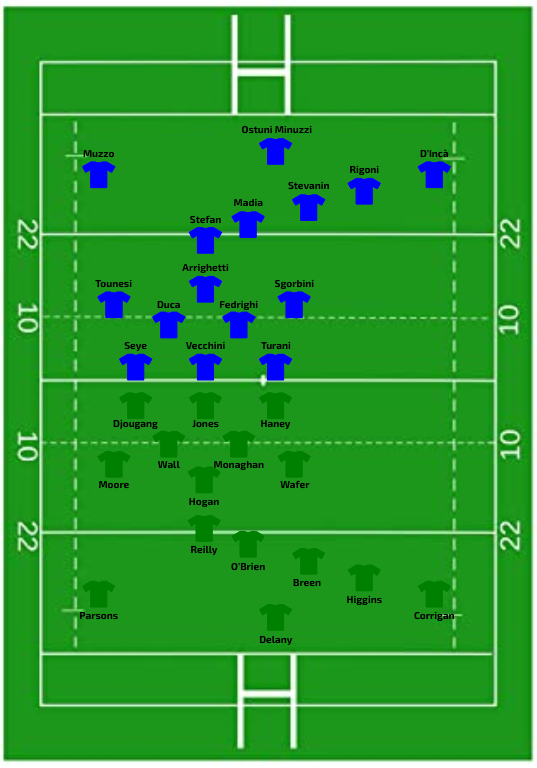

FB	15	Vittoria Ostuni Minuzzi	(yellow card) 7'
RW	14	Aura Muzzo
OC	13	Beatrice Rigoni
IC	12	Emma Stevanin
LW	11	Alyssa D'Incà
FH	10	Veronica Madia		(substituted off) 74'
SH	9	Sofia Stefan (c)
N8	8	Ilaria Arrighetti		(substituted off) 77'
OF	7	Francesca Sgorbini		(substituted off) 12'
BF	6	Sara Tounesi		(substituted off) 71'
RL	5	Giordana Duca
LL	4	Valeria Fedrighi
TP	3	Sara Seye		(substituted off) 74'
HK	2	Vittoria Vecchini		(substituted off) 80'
LP	1	Silvia Turani		(substituted off) 15'
Replacements:
HK	16	Laura Gurioli		(substituted on) 80'
PR	17	Gaia Maris		(substituted on) 15'
PR	18	Lucia Gai		(substituted on) 74'
LK	19	Isabella Locatelli		(substituted on) 71'
FL	20	Beatrice Veronese		(substituted on) 12'
FL	21	Alessandra Frangipani		(substituted on) 77'
WG	22	Francesca Granzotto		(substituted on) 74'
FB	23	Beatrice Capomaggi
Coach:
(Italy) Giovanni Raineri

Player of the Match:
Vittoria Vecchini (Italy)

Assistant referees:
Precious Pazani (Zimbabwe)
Maria Heitor (Portugal)
Television match official:
Chris Assmus (Canada)

Notes:

- This was Italy's first away win against Ireland.

=== Round 3 ===
13 April 2024
14:15 BST (UTC+1)

Scotland	0–46	England (1 BP)
	Report	Try: Cokayne 7' m Dow 12' m Kildunne (2) 34' c, 65' m Kabeya 44' c Breach (2) 52' m, 59' m Packer 73' c Con: Aitchison (2/7) 35', 45'; Harrison (1/1) 73'

Edinburgh Rugby Stadium, Edinburgh
Attendance: 7,774
Referee: Clara Munarini (Italy)

FB	15	Chloe Rollie
RW	14	Rhona Lloyd
OC	13	Emma Orr
IC	12	Meryl Smith	(substituted off) 40'
LW	11	Coreen Grant	(substituted off) 33'
FH	10	Helen Nelson
SH	9	Caity Mattinson	(substituted off) 56'
N8	8	Evie Gallagher
OF	7	Alex Stewart	(substituted off) 56'
BF	6	Rachel Malcolm (c)
RL	5	Louise McMillan
LL	4	Fiona McIntosh	(substituted off) 51'
TP	3	Christine Belisle	(substituted off) 53'
HK	2	Lana Skeldon	(substituted off) 60'
LP	1	Leah Bartlett	(substituted off) 53'
Replacements:
HK	16	Elis Martin	(substituted on) 60'
PR	17	Molly Wright	(substituted on) 53'
PR	18	Elliann Clarke	(substituted on) 53'
LK	19	Eva Donaldson	(substituted on) 51'
FL	20	Rachel McLachlan	(substituted on) 56'
SH	21	Mairi McDonald	(substituted on) 56'
CE	22	Lisa Thomson	(substituted on) 40'
WG	23	Francesca McGhie	(substituted on) 33'
Coach:
(Scotland) Bryan Easson

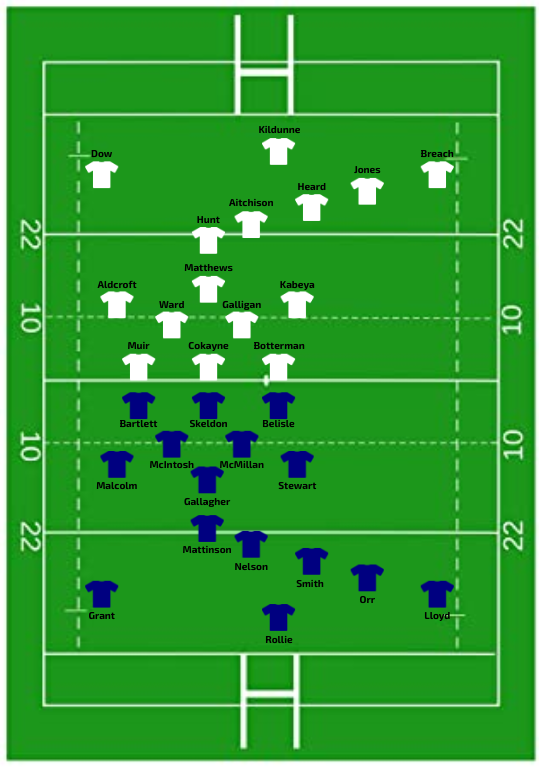

FB	15	Ellie Kildunne
RW	14	Abby Dow
OC	13	Megan Jones			(substituted off) 72'
IC	12	Tatyana Heard			(substituted off) 66'
LW	11	Jess Breach
FH	10	Holly Aitchison
SH	9	Natasha Hunt			(substituted off) 66'
N8	8	Alex Matthews			(substituted off) 60'
OF	7	Sadia Kabeya			(substituted off) 60'
BF	6	Zoe Aldcroft (c)
RL	5	Abbie Ward
LL	4	Rosie Galligan			(substituted off) 57'
TP	3	Maud Muir			(substituted off) 57'
HK	2	Amy Cokayne	(yellow card) 30'	(yellow card) 55' (red card)
LP	1	Hannah Botterman			(substituted off) 57'
Replacements:
HK	16	Connie Powell			(substituted on) 57'
PR	17	Mackenzie Carson			(substituted on) 57'
PR	18	Kelsey Clifford			(substituted on) 57'
FL	19	Maddie Feaunati			(substituted on) 60'
FL	20	Marlie Packer			(substituted on) 60'
SH	21	Lucy Packer			(substituted on) 66'
FH	22	Zoe Harrison			(substituted on) 66'
CE	23	Sydney Gregson			(substituted on) 72'
Coach:
(New Zealand) John Mitchell

Player of the Match:
Ellie Kildunne (England)

Assistant referees:
Maria Latos (Germany)
Adele Robert (Belgium)
Television match official:
Matteo Liperini (Italy)

Notes:

- Fiona McIntosh (Scotland) made her international debut.
- Emma Wassell was originally named in the second row for Scotland, but withdrew prior to the match due to injury. She was replaced by Fiona McIntosh, whose place on the bench was taken by Eva Donaldson.

13 April 2024
16:45 IST (UTC+1)

(1 BP) Ireland	36–5	Wales
Try: Wafer 14' c Higgins 20' c Jones 26' c Corrigan 42' c Parsons 60' m Con: O'Brien (4/5) 16', 21', 27', 43'; Pen: O'Brien (1/1) 49'	Report	Try: Hopkins 66' m

Musgrave Park, Cork
Attendance: 6,139
Referee: Sara Cox (England)

FB	15	Lauren Delany
RW	14	Katie Corrigan
OC	13	Eve Higgins
IC	12	Enya Breen	(substituted off) 55'
LW	11	Beibhinn Parsons
FH	10	Dannah O'Brien
SH	9	Aoibheann Reilly	(substituted off) 55'
N8	8	Brittany Hogan	(substituted off) 57'
OF	7	Edel McMahon (cc)	(substituted off) 67'
BF	6	Aoife Wafer	(substituted off) 74'
RL	5	Sam Monaghan (cc)	(substituted off) 49'
LL	4	Dorothy Wall
TP	3	Christy Haney	(substituted off) 64'
HK	2	Neve Jones	(substituted off) 52'
LP	1	Linda Djougang	(substituted off) 64'
Replacements:
HK	16	Cliodhna Moloney	(substituted on) 52'
PR	17	Niamh O'Dowd	(substituted on) 64'
PR	18	Sadhbh McGrath	(substituted on) 64'
LK	19	Fiona Tuite	(substituted on) 48'
FL	20	Shannon Ikahihifo	(substituted on) 57'
SH	21	Molly Scuffil-McCabe	(substituted on) 55'
FH	22	Nicole Fowley	(substituted on) 67'
CE	23	Aoife Dalton	(substituted on) 55'
Coach:
(England) Scott Bemand

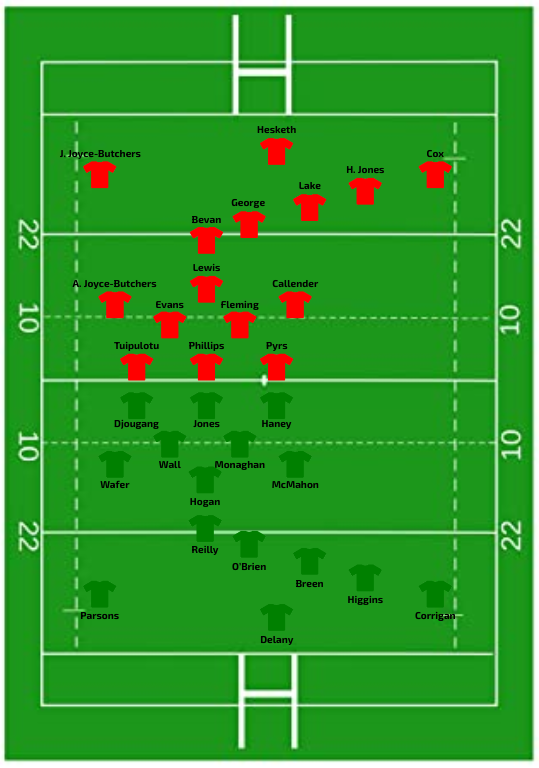

FB	15	Jenny Hesketh
RW	14	Jasmine Joyce-Butchers
OC	13	Hannah Jones (c)
IC	12	Kerin Lake	(substituted off) 33'
LW	11	Carys Cox
FH	10	Lleucu George	(substituted off) 61'
SH	9	Keira Bevan	(substituted off) 52'
N8	8	Bethan Lewis	(substituted off) 29'
OF	7	Alex Callender
BF	6	Alisha Joyce-Butchers
RL	5	Georgia Evans
LL	4	Abbie Fleming
TP	3	Sisilia Tuipulotu	(substituted off) 59'
HK	2	Carys Phillips	(substituted off) 52'
LP	1	Gwenllian Pyrs	(substituted off) 59'
Replacements:
HK	16	Molly Reardon	(substituted on) 52'
PR	17	Abbey Constable	(substituted on) 59'
PR	18	Donna Rose	(substituted on) 59'
LK	19	Natalia John	(substituted on) 29'
FL	20	Gwennan Hopkins	(substituted on) 61'
SH	21	Sian Jones	(substituted on) 52'
FH	22	Kayleigh Powell	(substituted on) 61'
FB	23	Courtney Keight	(substituted on) 33'
Coach:
(Wales) Ioan Cunningham

Player of the Match:
Aoife Wafer (Ireland)

Assistant referees:
Hollie Davidson (Scotland)
Chelsea Gillespie (Scotland)
Television match official:
Andrew McMenemy (Scotland)

Notes:

- Shannon Ikahifo (Ireland) and Gwennan Hopkins (Wales) made their international debuts.
- No replacement was made for Aoife Wafer (Ireland) when she came off in the 74th minute.

14 April 2024
12:30 CEST (UTC+2)

(1 BP) France	38–15	Italy
Try: Konde 2' c Deshayes 23' c Escudero 31' c Llorens 38' m Khalfaoui 44' c Fall Raclot 63' m Con: Queyroi (4/6) 4', 24', 33', 45'	Report	Try: D'Incà (2) 55' c, 77' m Con: Rigoni (1/2) 56'; Pen: Rigoni (1/1) 22'

Stade Jean-Bouin, Paris
Attendance: 13,586
Referee: Joy Neville (Ireland)

FB	15	Émilie Boulard
RW	14	Marine Ménager	(substituted off) 54'
OC	13	Nassira Konde
IC	12	Gabrielle Vernier
LW	11	Mélissande Llorens		(substituted off) 70'
FH	10	Lina Queyroi	(substituted off) 64'	(substituted on) 70'
SH	9	Pauline Bourdon Sansus	(substituted off) 51'
N8	8	Romane Ménager	(substituted off) 56'
OF	7	Émeline Gros	(substituted off) 67'
BF	6	Charlotte Escudero
RL	5	Madoussou Fall Raclot
LL	4	Manaé Feleu (c)
TP	3	Assia Khalfaoui	(substituted off) 63'
HK	2	Agathe Sochat	(substituted off) 63'
LP	1	Annaëlle Deshayes	(substituted off) 51'
Replacements:
HK	16	Élisa Riffonneau	(substituted on) 63'
PR	17	Ambre Mwayembe	(substituted on) 51'
PR	18	Clara Joyeux	(substituted on) 63'
LK	19	Gaëlle Hermet	(substituted on) 67'
FL	20	Teani Feleu	(substituted on) 56'
SH	21	Alexandra Chambon	(substituted on) 51'
CE	22	Lina Tuy	(substituted on) 64'
FB	23	Morgane Bourgeois	(substituted on) 54'
Coach:
(France) Gaëlle Mignot (France) David Ortiz

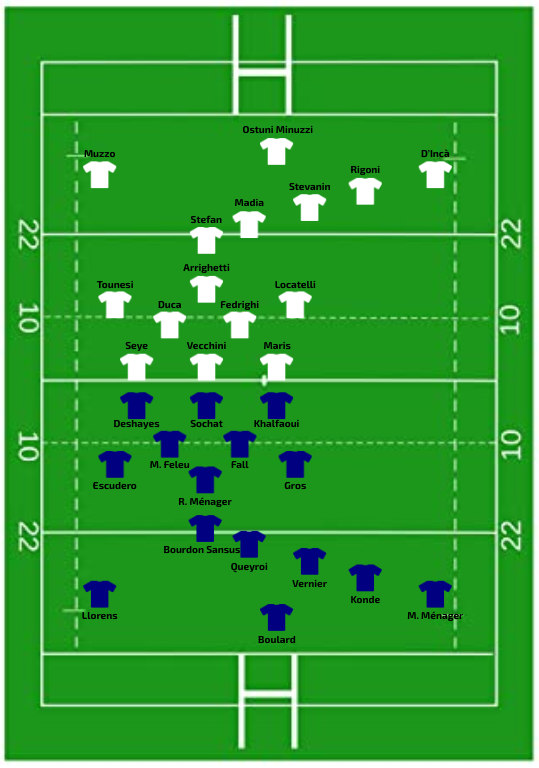

FB	15	Vittoria Ostuni Minuzzi
RW	14	Aura Muzzo
OC	13	Beatrice Rigoni		(substituted off) 67'
IC	12	Emma Stevanin
LW	11	Alyssa D'Incà
FH	10	Veronica Madia		(substituted off) 53'
SH	9	Sofia Stefan (c)
N8	8	Ilaria Arrighetti		(substituted off) 60'
OF	7	Isabella Locatelli
BF	6	Sara Tounesi	(yellow card) 30'	(substituted off) 70'
RL	5	Giordana Duca		(substituted off) 67'
LL	4	Valeria Fedrighi
TP	3	Sara Seye		(substituted off) 54'
HK	2	Vittoria Vecchini		(substituted off) 63'
LP	1	Gaia Maris		(substituted off) 54'
Replacements:
HK	16	Laura Gurioli		(substituted on) 63'
PR	17	Emanuela Stecca		(substituted on) 54'
PR	18	Lucia Gai		(substituted on) 54'
LK	19	Alessia Pilani		(substituted on) 67'
FL	20	Beatrice Veronese		(substituted on) 60'
FL	21	Alessandra Frangipani		(substituted on) 67'
SH	22	Francesca Granzotto		(substituted on) 53'
FB	23	Beatrice Capomaggi		(substituted on) 67'
Coach:
(Italy) Giovanni Raineri

Player of the Match:
Assia Khalfaoui (France)

Assistant referees:
Holly Wood (England)
Maria Heitor (Portugal)
Television match official:
Leo Colgan (Ireland)

Notes:

- Teani Feleu (France) made her international debut.
- This was the last test as an official for Joy Neville, who announced her retirement before the beginning of the tournament.

=== Round 4 ===
20 April 2024
14:15 BST (UTC+1)

(1 BP) England	88–10	Ireland
Try: Dow (3) 7' m, 37' m, 64' c Hunt 10' c Jones (2) 13' c, 58' c Aldcroft 19' c Kildunne (3) 28' c, 68' c, 75' m Breach (2) 44' m, 72' c Kabeya 49' c Feaunati 77' m Con: Aitchison (9/14) 11', 14', 20', 29', 49', 59', 65', 70', 73'	Report	Try: Penalty try 56'; Pen: O'Brien (1/1) 24'

Twickenham Stadium, London
Attendance: 48,778
Referee: Aurélie Groizeleau (France)

FB	15	Ellie Kildunne
RW	14	Abby Dow
OC	13	Megan Jones		(substituted off) 68'
IC	12	Tatyana Heard		(substituted off) 63'
LW	11	Jess Breach
FH	10	Holly Aitchison
SH	9	Natasha Hunt		(substituted off) 50'
N8	8	Alex Matthews
OF	7	Marlie Packer (c)		(substituted off) 61'
BF	6	Sadia Kabeya
RL	19	Morwenna Talling
LL	4	Zoe Aldcroft
TP	3	Maud Muir		(substituted off) 50'
HK	2	Lark Atkin-Davies		(substituted off) 35'
LP	1	Hannah Botterman		(substituted off) 45'
Replacements:
HK	16	Connie Powell		(substituted on) 36'
PR	17	Mackenzie Carson		(substituted on) 45'
PR	18	Kelsey Clifford		(substituted on) 50'	(substituted off) 76'
LK	24	Lizzie Hanlon			(substituted on) 76'
FL	20	Maddie Feaunati		(substituted on) 61'
SH	21	Lucy Packer	(yellow card) 56'	(substituted on) 50'
CE	22	Emily Scarratt		(substituted on) 63'
CE	23	Sydney Gregson		(substituted on) 68'
Coach:
(New Zealand) John Mitchell

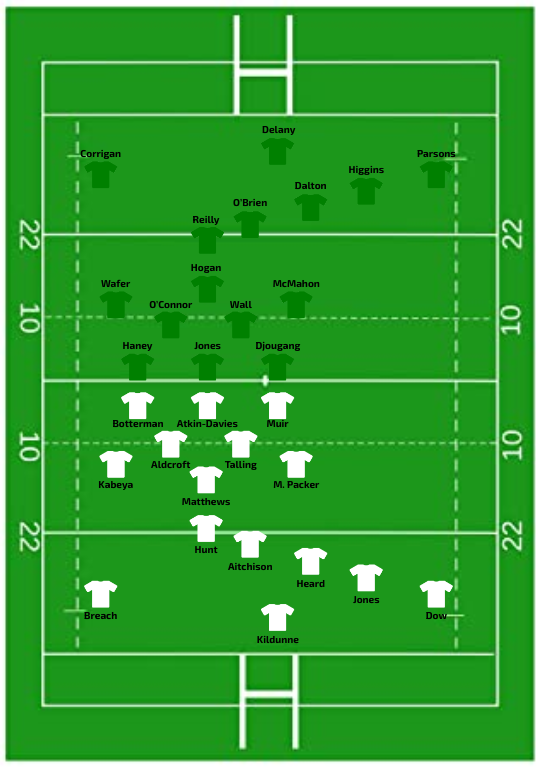

FB	15	Lauren Delany	(substituted off) 40'
RW	14	Katie Corrigan
OC	13	Eve Higgins	(substituted off) 40'
IC	12	Aoife Dalton
LW	11	Beibhinn Parsons
FH	10	Dannah O'Brien
SH	9	Aoibheann Reilly
N8	8	Brittany Hogan
OF	7	Edel McMahon (c)
BF	6	Aoife Wafer
RL	5	Hannah O'Connor	(substituted off) 45'
LL	4	Dorothy Wall
TP	3	Christy Haney	(substituted off) 49'
HK	2	Neve Jones	(substituted off) 45'
LP	1	Linda Djougang	(substituted off) 62'
Replacements:
HK	16	Cliodhna Moloney	(substituted on) 45'
PR	17	Niamh O'Dowd	(substituted on) 49'
PR	18	Sadhbh McGrath	(substituted on) 62'
LK	19	Fiona Tuite	(substituted on) 45'
FL	20	Shannon Ikahihifo	(substituted on) 56'
SH	21	Molly Scuffil-McCabe	(substituted on) 60'
CE	22	Enya Breen	(substituted on) 40'
FB	23	Méabh Deely	(substituted on) 40'
Coach:
(England) Scott Bemand

Player of the Match:
Ellie Kildunne (England)

Assistant referees:
Doriane Domenjo (France)
Adele Robert (Belgium)
Television match official:
Rachel Horton (Australia)

Notes:

- Lizzie Hanlon (England) made her international debut.
- Rosie Galligan was originally named in the England second row, but withdrew through injury during the warm-up. She was replaced by Morwenna Talling, whose place on the bench was taken by Lizzie Hanlon. Talling resumed wearing 19 while Hanlon wore 24.
- With this win, England won their 24th Triple Crown, their 8th in succession.

20 April 2024
16:45 CEST (UTC+2)

(1 BP) Italy	10–17	Scotland
Try: D'Incà 32' c Con: Rigoni (1/1) 33'; Pen: Rigoni (1/1) 74'	Report	Try: Skeldon 35' c Orr 63' m Rollie 69' m Con: Nelson (1/3) 36'

Stadio Sergio Lanfranchi, Parma
Attendance: 3,000
Referee: Maggie Cogger-Orr (New Zealand)

FB	15	Vittoria Ostuni Minuzzi
RW	14	Aura Muzzo
OC	13	Alyssa D'Incà
IC	12	Beatrice Rigoni
LW	11	Francesca Granzotto
FH	10	Veronica Madia
SH	9	Sofia Stefan
N8	8	Elisa Giordano (c)
OF	7	Francesca Sgorbini	(substituted off) 72'
BF	6	Ilaria Arrighetti
RL	5	Giordana Duca
LL	4	Sara Tounesi
TP	3	Sara Seye
HK	2	Vittoria Vecchini
LP	1	Silvia Turani
Replacements:
HK	16	Laura Gurioli
PR	17	Gaia Maris
PR	18	Lucia Gai
LK	19	Valeria Fedrighi
FL	20	Isabella Locatelli	(substituted on) 72'
SH	21	Beatrice Veronese
CE	22	Sara Mannini
FB	23	Beatrice Capomaggi
Coach:
(Italy) Giovanni Raineri

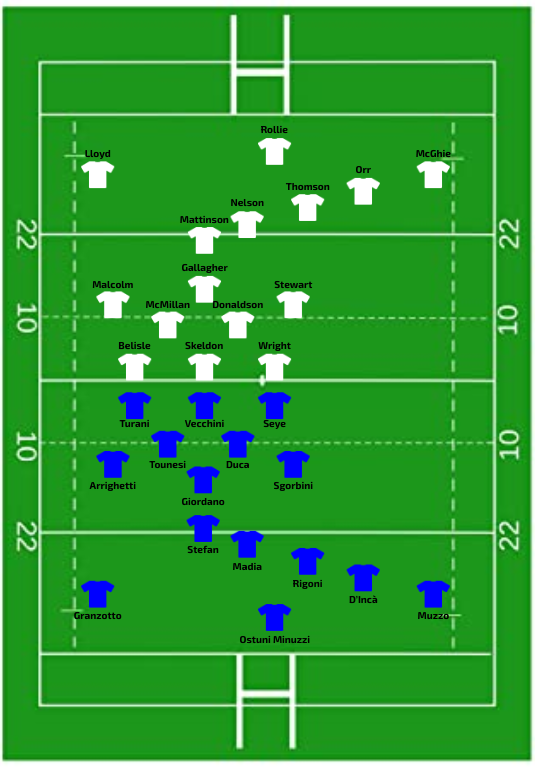

FB	15	Chloe Rollie	(red card) 80'
RW	14	Rhona Lloyd
OC	13	Emma Orr
IC	12	Lisa Thomson
LW	11	Francesca McGhie
FH	10	Helen Nelson
SH	9	Caity Mattinson		(substituted off) 59'
N8	8	Evie Gallagher
OF	7	Alex Stewart		(substituted off) 62'
BF	6	Rachel Malcolm (c)
RL	5	Louise McMillan
LL	4	Eva Donaldson		(substituted off) 70'
TP	3	Christine Belisle		(substituted off) 52'
HK	2	Lana Skeldon		(substituted off) 74'
LP	1	Molly Wright		(substituted off) 52'
Replacements:
HK	16	Elis Martin		(substituted on) 74'
PR	17	Leah Bartlett		(substituted on) 52'
PR	18	Elliann Clarke		(substituted on) 52'
LK	19	Fiona McIntosh		(substituted on) 70'
FL	20	Rachel McLachlan		(substituted on) 61'
SH	21	Mairi McDonald		(substituted on) 59'
CE	22	Meryl Smith
WG	23	Coreen Grant
Coach:
(Scotland) Bryan Easson

Player of the Match:
Lana Skeldon (Scotland)

Assistant referees:
Natarsha Ganley (New Zealand)
Amber Stamp-Dunstan (Wales)
Television match official:
Ian Tempest (England)

Notes:

- This was Scotland's first victory over Italy in Italy since defeating them 43–15 in the 1999 European Championship.

21 April 2024
15:15 BST (UTC+1)

Wales	0–40	France (1 BP)
	Report	Try: Deshayes 11' c Grisez (2) 16' c, 79' c R. Ménager 31' m Vernier 45' c M. Feleu 58' m Con: Queyroi (4/5) 12', 18', 46', 60'; Bourgeois (1/1) 80'

Cardiff Arms Park, Cardiff
Attendance: 5,786
Referee: Hollie Davidson (Scotland)

FB	15	Kayleigh Powell
RW	14	Catherine Richards
OC	13	Hannah Jones (c)
IC	12	Carys Cox	(substituted off) 65'
LW	11	Courtney Keight	(substituted off) 46'
FH	10	Lleucu George
SH	9	Sian Jones	(substituted off) 46'
N8	8	Georgia Evans
OF	7	Alex Callender
BF	6	Alisha Joyce-Butchers
RL	5	Abbie Fleming	(substituted off) 60'
LL	4	Natalia John	(substituted off) 46'
TP	3	Sisilia Tuipulotu	(substituted off) 60'
HK	2	Carys Phillips	(substituted off) 60'
LP	1	Gwenllian Pyrs	(substituted off) 60'
Replacements:
HK	16	Molly Reardon	(substituted on) 60'
PR	17	Abbey Constable	(substituted on) 60'
PR	18	Donna Rose	(substituted on) 60'
LK	19	Kate Williams	(substituted on) 60'
FL	20	Gwennan Hopkins	(substituted on) 46'
SH	21	Keira Bevan	Substituted on
CE	22	Mollie Wilkinson	(substituted on) 65'
WG	23	Jasmine Joyce-Butchers	(substituted on) 46'
Coach:
(Wales) Ioan Cunningham

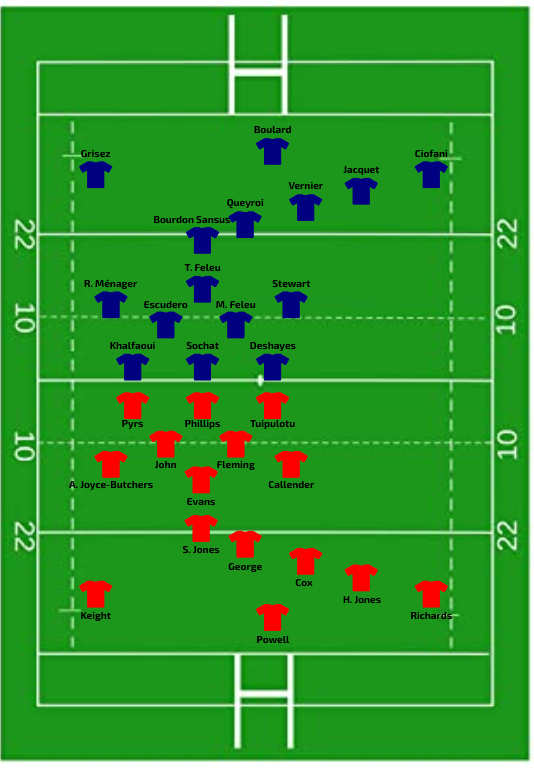

FB	15	Émilie Boulard		(substituted off) 72'
RW	14	Joanna Grisez
OC	13	Chloé Jacquet	(yellow card) 80+3'
IC	12	Gabrielle Vernier
LW	11	Anne-Cécile Ciofani	(yellow card) 1'
FH	10	Lina Queyroi		(substituted off) 65'
SH	9	Pauline Bourdon Sansus		(substituted off) 61'
N8	8	Teani Feleu
OF	7	Émeline Gros		(substituted off) 53'
BF	6	Romane Ménager		(substituted off) 65'
RL	5	Charlotte Escudero
LL	4	Manaé Feleu (c)		(substituted off) 65'	(substituted on) 75'
TP	3	Assia Khalfaoui	(yellow card) 63'		(substituted off) 75'
HK	2	Agathe Sochat		(substituted off) 53'
LP	1	Annaëlle Deshayes		(substituted off) 56'
Replacements:
HK	16	Élisa Riffonneau		(substituted on) 53'
PR	17	Ambre Mwayembe		(substituted on) 56'
PR	18	Clara Joyeux		(substituted on) 65'
LK	19	Madoussou Fall Raclot		(substituted on) 65'
FL	20	Gaëlle Hermet		(substituted on) 53'
SH	21	Alexandra Chambon		(substituted on) 61'
CE	22	Lina Tuy		(substituted on) 68'
FB	23	Morgane Bourgeois		(substituted on) 72'
Coach:
(France) Gaëlle Mignot (France) David Ortiz

Player of the Match:
Annaëlle Deshayes (France)

Assistant referees:
Clara Munarini (Italy)
Maria Latos (Germany)
Television match official:
Matteo Liperini (Italy)

Notes:

- Anne-Cécile Ciofani (France) made her international debut.

=== Round 5 ===
27 April 2024
12:15 BST (UTC+1)

Wales	22–20	Italy (1 BP)
Try: Phillips 16' m Pyrs 44' c Tuipulotu 78' c Con: Bevan (1/2) 45'; George (1/1) 79'; Pen: Bevan (1/1) 52'	Report	Try: Minuzzi 18' c Granzotto 56' m Stevanin 70' m Con: Rigoni (1/3) 19'; Pen: Rigoni (1/1) 39'

Millennium Stadium, Cardiff
Attendance: 10,592
Referee: Aimee Barrett-Theron (South Africa)

FB	15	Jenny Hesketh
RW	14	Lisa Neumann
OC	13	Hannah Jones (c)
IC	12	Hannah Bluck
LW	11	Carys Cox
FH	10	Lleucu George
SH	9	Keira Bevan	(substituted off) 75'
N8	8	Georgia Evans
OF	7	Alex Callender
BF	6	Alisha Joyce-Butchers
RL	5	Abbie Fleming	(substituted off) 71'
LL	4	Natalia John	(substituted off) 59'
TP	3	Sisilia Tuipulotu
HK	2	Carys Phillips	(substituted off) 62'
LP	1	Gwenllian Pyrs	(substituted off) 68'
Replacements:
HK	16	Kelsey Jones	(substituted on) 62'
PR	17	Abbey Constable
PR	18	Donna Rose	(substituted on) 68'
LK	19	Kate Williams	(substituted on) 59'
FL	20	Gwennan Hopkins	(substituted on) 71'
SH	21	Sian Jones	(substituted on) 75'
FH	22	Niamh Terry
WG	23	Nel Metcalfe
Coach:
(Wales) Ioan Cunningham

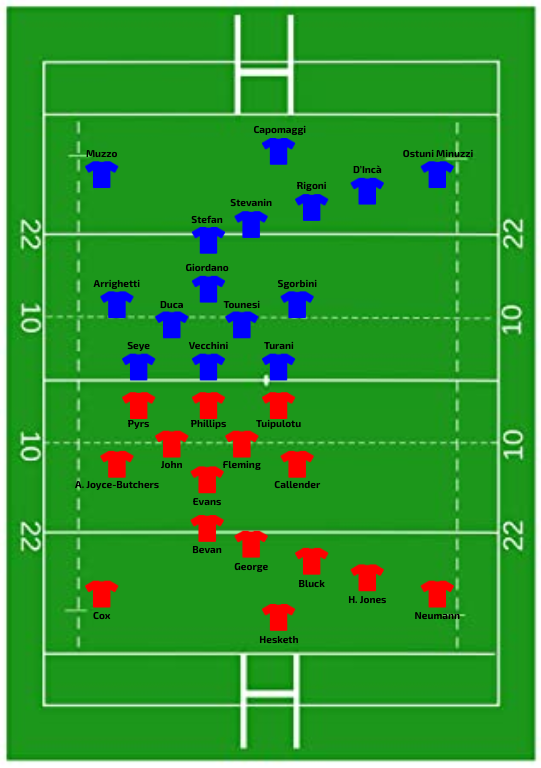

FB	15	Beatrice Capomaggi		(substituted off) 51'
RW	14	Aura Muzzo
OC	13	Alyssa D'Incà
IC	12	Beatrice Rigoni
LW	11	Vittoria Ostuni Minuzzi
FH	10	Emma Stevanin	(yellow card) 80'
SH	9	Sofia Stefan
N8	8	Elisa Giordano (c)
OF	7	Francesca Sgorbini		(substituted off) 75'
BF	6	Ilaria Arrighetti
RL	5	Giordana Duca
LL	4	Sara Tounesi		(substituted off) 60'
TP	3	Sara Seye		(substituted off) 40'
HK	2	Vittoria Vecchini
LP	1	Silvia Turani
Replacements:
HK	16	Laura Gurioli
PR	17	Gaia Maris
PR	18	Lucia Gai		(substituted on) 40'
LK	19	Valeria Fedrighi		(substituted on) 60'
FL	20	Isabella Locatelli		(substituted on) 75'
FL	21	Beatrice Veronese
FH	22	Veronica Madia
WG	23	Francesca Granzotto		(substituted on) 51'
Coach:
(Italy) Giovanni Raineri

Player of the Match:
Gwenllian Pyrs (Wales)

Assistant referees:
Sara Cox (England)
Chelsea Gillespie (Scotland)
Television match official:
Rachel Horton (Australia)

Notes:

- Lucia Gai became the second Italian woman, after Sara Barattin, to earn her 100th Test cap.
- Wales received the Wooden Spoon, after finishing bottom of the Six Nations table for the first time since 2021, and for the first time in the traditional round robin format since 2018.
- This was the first Italy–Wales match won by the home team since 2015.

27 April 2024
14:30 BST (UTC+1)

Ireland	15–12	Scotland (1 BP)
Try: Corrigan 42' m Moloney 59' c Con: O'Brien (1/2) 60'; Pen: O'Brien (1/1) 74'	Report	Try: Martin 8' m Thomson 50' c Con: Nelson (1/2) 52'

Ravenhill Stadium, Belfast
Attendance: 7,468
Referee: Natarsha Ganley (New Zealand)

FB	15	Méabh Deely
RW	14	Katie Corrigan
OC	13	Eve Higgins
IC	12	Enya Breen
LW	11	Beibhinn Parsons	(yellow card) 79'
FH	10	Dannah O'Brien
SH	9	Aoibheann Reilly
N8	8	Brittany Hogan
OF	7	Edel McMahon (cc)		(substituted off) 72'
BF	6	Aoife Wafer
RL	5	Sam Monaghan (cc)
LL	4	Dorothy Wall
TP	3	Christy Haney		(substituted off) 40'
HK	2	Neve Jones		(substituted off) 46'
LP	1	Linda Djougang
Replacements:
HK	16	Cliodhna Moloney		(substituted on) 46'
PR	17	Niamh O'Dowd
PR	18	Sadhbh McGrath		(substituted on) 40'
LK	19	Fiona Tuite
FL	20	Shannon Ikahihifo		(substituted on) 72'
SH	21	Molly Scuffil-McCabe
CE	22	Aoife Dalton
WG	23	Katie Heffernan
Coach:
(England) Scott Bemand

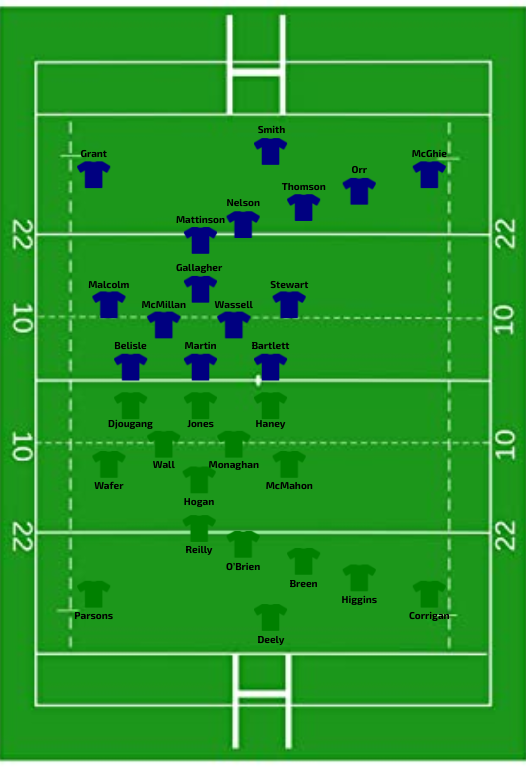

FB	15	Meryl Smith
RW	14	Coreen Grant
OC	13	Emma Orr
IC	12	Lisa Thomson
LW	11	Francesca McGhie
FH	10	Helen Nelson
SH	9	Caity Mattinson	(substituted off) 12'
N8	8	Evie Gallagher
OF	7	Alex Stewart	(substituted off) 59'
BF	6	Rachel Malcolm (c)
RL	5	Louise McMillan	(substituted off) 59'
LL	4	Emma Wassell
TP	3	Christine Belisle	(substituted off) 48'
HK	2	Elis Martin	(substituted off) 64'
LP	1	Leah Bartlett	(substituted off) 64'
Replacements:
HK	16	Molly Wright	(substituted on) 64'
PR	17	Lisa Cockburn	(substituted on) 64'
PR	18	Elliann Clarke	(substituted on) 48'
LK	19	Eva Donaldson	(substituted on) 59'
FL	20	Rachel McLachlan	(substituted on) 59'
SH	21	Mairi McDonald	(substituted on) 12'
CE	22	Cieron Bell
WG	23	Nicole Flynn
Coach:
(Scotland) Bryan Easson

Player of the Match:
Brittany Hogan (Ireland)

Assistant referees:
Aurélie Groizeleau (France)
Holly Wood (England)
Television match official:
Ian Tempest (England)

Notes:

- Lana Skeldon was named as Scotland hooker, but withdrew before kick-off due to injury. She was replaced by Elis Martin.

27 April 2024
17:45 CEST (UTC+2)

France	21–42	England (1 BP)
Try: Vernier 18' c M. Ménager (2) 28' c, 70' c Con: Queyroi (3/3) 20', 29', 71'	Report	Try: Muir 5' c Matthews (2) 12' c, 73' c Jones 25' c M. Packer 33' c Cokayne 40' c Con: Aitchison (6/6) 6', 13', 26', 34', 40' +1, 74'

Stade Chaban-Delmas, Bordeaux
Attendance: 28,023
Referee: Maggie Cogger-Orr (New Zealand)

FB	15	Émilie Boulard		(substituted off) 62'
RW	14	Anne-Cécile Ciofani
OC	13	Nassira Konde
IC	12	Gabrielle Vernier
LW	11	Marine Ménager
FH	10	Lina Queyroi
SH	9	Pauline Bourdon Sansus		(substituted off) 74'
N8	8	Romane Ménager
OF	7	Gaëlle Hermet		(substituted off) 64'
BF	6	Charlotte Escudero
RL	5	Madoussou Fall Raclot		(substituted off) 69'
LL	4	Manaé Feleu (c)		(substituted off) 46'
TP	3	Assia Khalfaoui	(red card) 44'
HK	2	Agathe Sochat		(substituted off) 71'
LP	1	Annaëlle Deshayes		(substituted off) 56'
Replacements:
HK	16	Élisa Riffonneau		(substituted on) 71'
PR	17	Ambre Mwayembe		(substituted on) 56'
PR	18	Clara Joyeux		(substituted on) 46'
FL	19	Émeline Gros
FL	20	Teani Feleu
SH	21	Alexandra Chambon		(substituted on) 74'
FL	22	Axelle Berthoumieu
FB	23	Chloé Jacquet		(substituted on) 62'
Coach:
(France) Gaëlle Mignot (France) David Ortiz

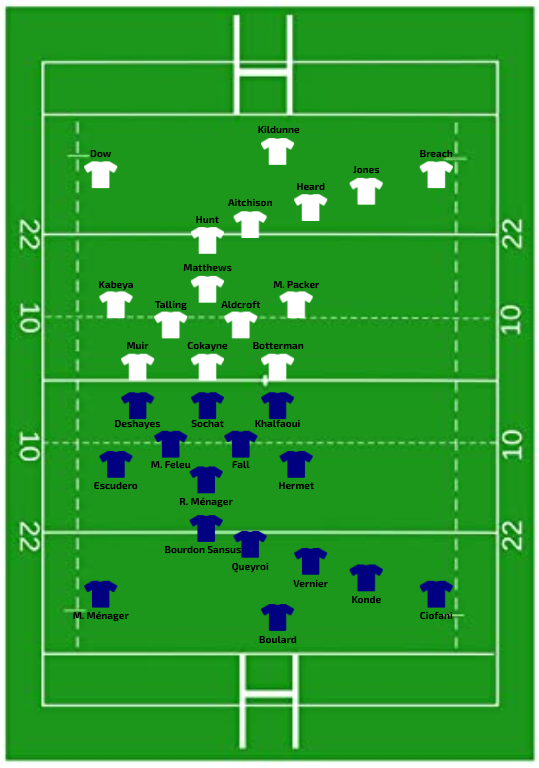

FB	15	Ellie Kildunne
RW	14	Abby Dow
OC	13	Megan Jones
IC	12	Tatyana Heard	(substituted off) 71'
LW	11	Jess Breach	(substituted off) 80'
FH	10	Holly Aitchison
SH	9	Natasha Hunt	(substituted off) 69'
N8	8	Alex Matthews
OF	7	Marlie Packer (c)	(substituted off) 74'
BF	6	Sadia Kabeya
RL	5	Morwenna Talling	(substituted off) 45'
LL	4	Zoe Aldcroft
TP	3	Maud Muir	(substituted off) 80'
HK	2	Amy Cokayne	(substituted off) 66'
LP	1	Hannah Botterman	(substituted off) 66'
Replacements:
HK	16	Connie Powell	(substituted on) 66'
PR	17	Mackenzie Carson	(substituted on) 66'
PR	18	Kelsey Clifford	(substituted on) 80'
LK	19	Abbie Ward	(substituted on) 45'
FL	20	Maddie Feaunati	(substituted on) 74'
SH	21	Lucy Packer	(substituted on) 69'
CE	22	Emily Scarratt	(substituted on) 71'
CE	23	Sydney Gregson	(substituted on) 80'
Coach:
(New Zealand) John Mitchell

Player of the Match:
Alex Matthews (England)

Assistant referees:
Clara Munarini (Italy)
Maria Heitor (Portugal)
Television match official:
Andrew McMenemy (Scotland)

Notes:

- Joanna Grisez was originally named on the right wing for France, but withdrew due to injury. She was replaced by Anne-Cécile Ciofani, whose place on the bench was taken by Axelle Berthoumieu.
- With this win, England secured their 20th Six Nations title and their 18th Grand Slam.

== Player statistics ==
=== Top points scorers ===
As of 28 April 2024

Rank	Player	Team	Points
1	Ellie Kildunne	England	45
2	Holly Aitchison	England	42
3	Lina Queyroi	France	38
4	Dannah O'Brien	Ireland	27
5	Abby Dow	England	25
6	Beatrice Rigoni	Italy	22
7	Jess Breach	England	20
8	Keira Bevan	Wales	18
9	Alyssa D'Incà	Italy	15
9	Marlie Packer	England	15
9	Megan Jones	England	15
9	Marine Ménager	France	15

=== Top try scorers ===
As of 28 April 2024

Rank	Player	Team	Tries
1	Ellie Kildunne	England	9
2	Abby Dow	England	5
3	Jess Breach	England	4
4	Alyssa D'Incà	Italy	3
4	Marine Ménager	France	3
4	Marlie Packer	England	3
4	Megan Jones	England	3
4	Katie Corrigan	Ireland	3
9	16 players tied		2

== Discipline ==
=== Summary ===
Team	Yellow card	Red card	Total
England	4	2	6
France	3	1	4
Ireland	1	0	1
Italy	3	0	3
Scotland	1	1	2
Wales	0	0	0

=== Yellow cards ===
2 yellow cards

- (England) Amy Cokayne (2 vs. Scotland)

1 yellow card

- (England) Lucy Packer (vs. Ireland)
- (England) Helena Rowland (vs. Italy)
- (France) Anne-Cécile Ciofani (vs. Wales)
- (France) Chloé Jacquet (vs. Wales)
- (France) Assia Khalfaoui (vs. Wales)
- (Ireland) Beibhinn Parsons (vs. Scotland)
- (Italy) Vittoria Ostuni Minuzzi (vs. Ireland)
- (Italy) Emma Stevanin (vs. England)
- (Italy) Sara Tounesi (vs. France)
- (Scotland) Alex Stewart (vs. Wales)

=== Red cards ===
1 red card

- (England) Sarah Beckett (vs. Italy)
- (England) Amy Cokayne (vs. Scotland)
- (France) Assia Khalfaoui (vs. England)
- (Scotland) Chloe Rollie (vs. Italy)

=== Citings/bans ===
Player	Match	Citing date	Law breached	Result	Ref
Sarah Beckett	Italy vs. **England**	24 March 2024	9.20(d) – Dangerous Play in Ruck (Red card)	3-match ban	
Amy Cokayne	Scotland vs. **England**	13 April 2024	9.27 – 2 Yellow Cards (Red card)	1-match ban	
Chloe Rollie	Italy vs. **Scotland**	20 April 2024	9.18 – Tip Tackle (Red card)	3-match ban	
Assia Khalfaoui	**France** vs. England	27 April 2024	9.20(b) – Dangerous Play in Ruck (Red card)	2-match ban	

Note: The cited player's team is listed in bold italics.

== Awards ==
=== Player of the Match awards ===
Awards	Player	Team	Opponent
3	Ellie Kildunne	England	Italy ^{(R1)}
3	Ellie Kildunne	England	Scotland ^{(R3)}
3	Ellie Kildunne	England	Ireland ^{(R4)}
1	Rosie Galligan	England	Wales ^{(R2)}
1	Alex Matthews	England	France ^{(R5)}
1	Annaëlle Deshayes	France	Wales ^{(R4)}
1	Madoussou Fall Raclot	France	Ireland ^{(R1)}
1	Assia Khalfaoui	France	Italy ^{(R3)}
1	Romane Ménager	France	Scotland ^{(R2)}
1	Brittany Hogan	Ireland	Scotland ^{(R5)}
1	Aoife Wafer	Ireland	Wales ^{(R3)}
1	Vittoria Vecchini	Italy	Ireland ^{(R2)}
1	Coreen Grant	Scotland	Wales ^{(R1)}
1	Lana Skeldon	Scotland	Italy ^{(R4)}
1	Gwenllian Pyrs	Wales	Italy ^{(R5)}

=== Player of the Championship ===
Four players were nominated for the 2024 Women's Six Nations Player of the Championship on 30 April 2024. The winner was announced on 17 May 2024.

Team	Nominee	Position	Winner
England	Ellie Kildunne	Full Back	(England) Ellie Kildunne
France	Romane Ménager	Number 8	(England) Ellie Kildunne
Ireland	Aoife Wafer	Flanker	(England) Ellie Kildunne
Italy	Alyssa D'Incà	Wing	(England) Ellie Kildunne

=== Try of the Championship ===
Four tries were nominated for the 2024 Women's Six Nations Try of the Championship on 2 May 2024. The winner was announced on 14 May 2024.

Team	Nominee	Try	Winner
England	Abby Dow	vs. Ireland ^{(R4)}	(Italy) Alyssa D'Incà
England	Ellie Kildunne	vs. Wales ^{(R2)}	(Italy) Alyssa D'Incà
France	Annaëlle Deshayes	vs. Italy ^{(R3)}	(Italy) Alyssa D'Incà
Italy	Alyssa D'Incà	vs. France ^{(R3)}	(Italy) Alyssa D'Incà

=== Team of the Championship ===
The 15 players voted in as the 2024 Women's Six Nations Team of the Championship were announced on 16 May 2024.

Forwards
Number	Team	Player
1	England	Hannah Botterman
2	Ireland	Neve Jones
3	England	Maud Muir
4	France	Manaé Feleu
5	England	Zoe Aldcroft
6	Ireland	Aoife Wafer
7	England	Sadia Kabeya
8	France	Romane Ménager

Backs
Number	Team	Player
9	England	Natasha Hunt
10	England	Holly Aitchison
11	England	Abby Dow
12	Italy	Beatrice Rigoni
13	England	Megan Jones
14	Italy	Alyssa D'Incà
15	England	Ellie Kildunne

== Broadcast ==
Country	Broadcaster	Ref
Australia	Stan Sport	
United Kingdom	BBC Sport	
France	France TV	
Republic of Ireland	RTÉ; Virgin Media Television	
Italy	Sky Sport Italia	
