= Lina Tuy =

French rugby player (born 2004)

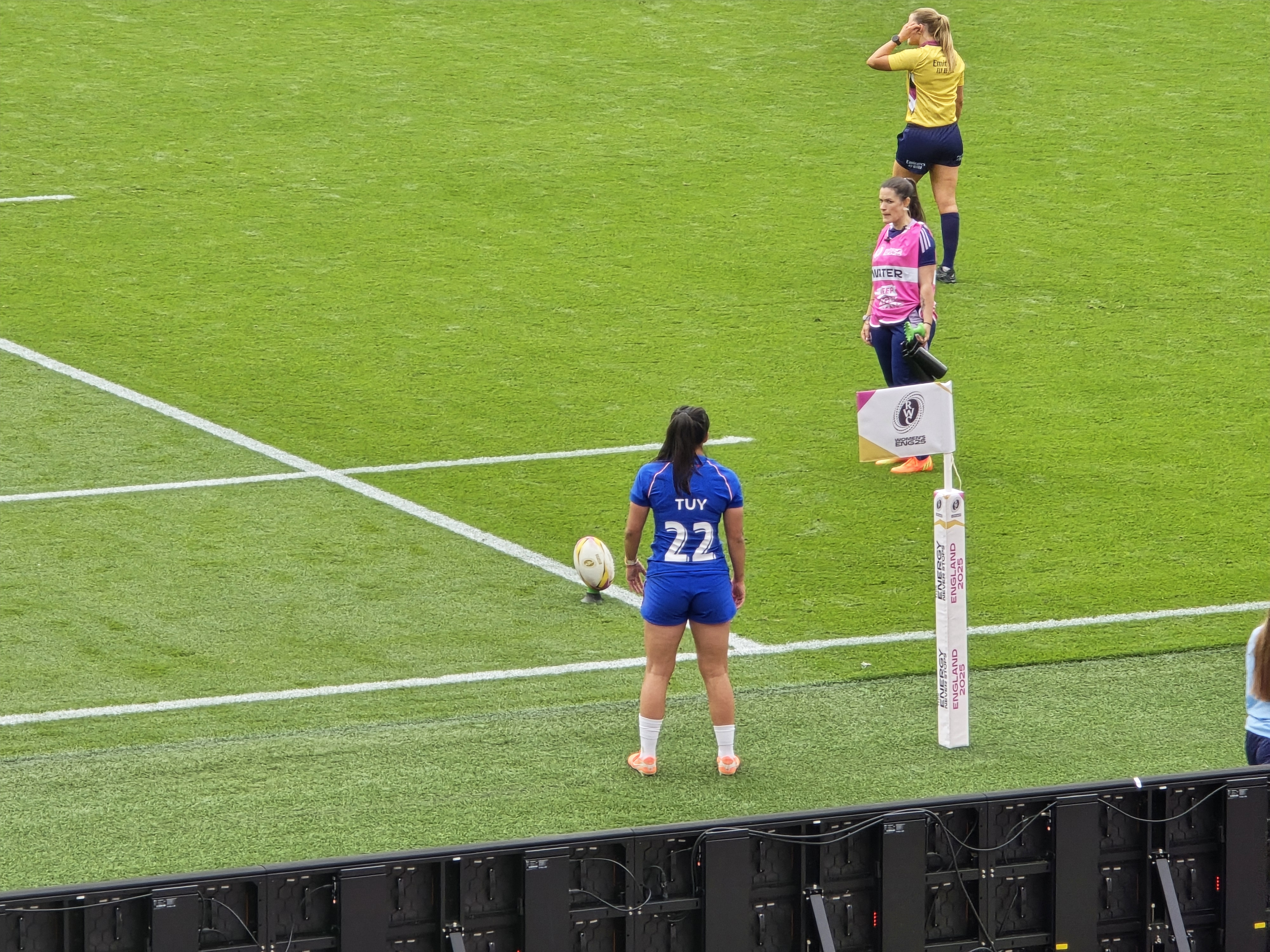
- 2025 Women's Rugby World Cup - New Zealand vs France
- Born: 10 September 2004 (age 22)
- Height: 169 cm (5 ft 7 in)

Rugby union career
- Position: Fly-half
Senior career
Years	Team	Apps	(Points)
2023–	ASM Romagnat		(0)
International career
Years	Team	Apps	(Points)
2024–	France	12	(13)

Lina Tuy (born 10 September 2004) is a French rugby union and sevens player.

== Early life and career ==
Tuy is from Aixe-sur-Vienne, where she started playing rugby union in 2013. She previously played for USA Limoges and CA Brive's youth teams. She then joined ASM Romagnat in 2022.

Alongside her sporting career, in 2024 she was studying for a Bachelor of Technical Studies degree in Business and Administration Management at the University of Clermont-Auvergne.

== Rugby career ==
Tuy joined the French Rugby Federation's Olympic Academy and was part of a group of 35 players preparing for the inaugural 2023 WXV tournament with the French team.

In March 2024, she was simultaneously selected to join the French fifteens side for the 2024 Six Nations tournament, and the sevens team in preparation for the Olympics. In the opening match of the Six Nations tournament she came off the bench and made her international debut against Ireland, she replaced Lina Queyroi.

In September 2024, she got her first start for the side against England at Twickenham, France lost 38–19 in the warmup match before the WXV tournament.

On 2 August 2025, she was named in the French squad to the Women's Rugby World Cup in England.
