= Wafer (surname) =

Wafer (Weafer, Weaver) is an English surname, and may refer to

- Aoife Wafer (born 2003), Irish rugby union player
- Jeremy Wafer (born 1952), South African artist
- Ken Weafer (1913–2005), American baseball player
- Lionel Wafer (c. 1640–1705), Welsh explorer and privateer
- Theodore Wafer, responsible for the murder of Renisha McBride in Michigan in 2013
- Von Wafer (born 1985), American basketball player

== See also ==
- Weaver (disambiguation), an English variant
- Wever (disambiguation), a Dutch variant
- Weber, a German variant
- Webber (surname), an English variant
