= Nassira Konde =

France international rugby union player

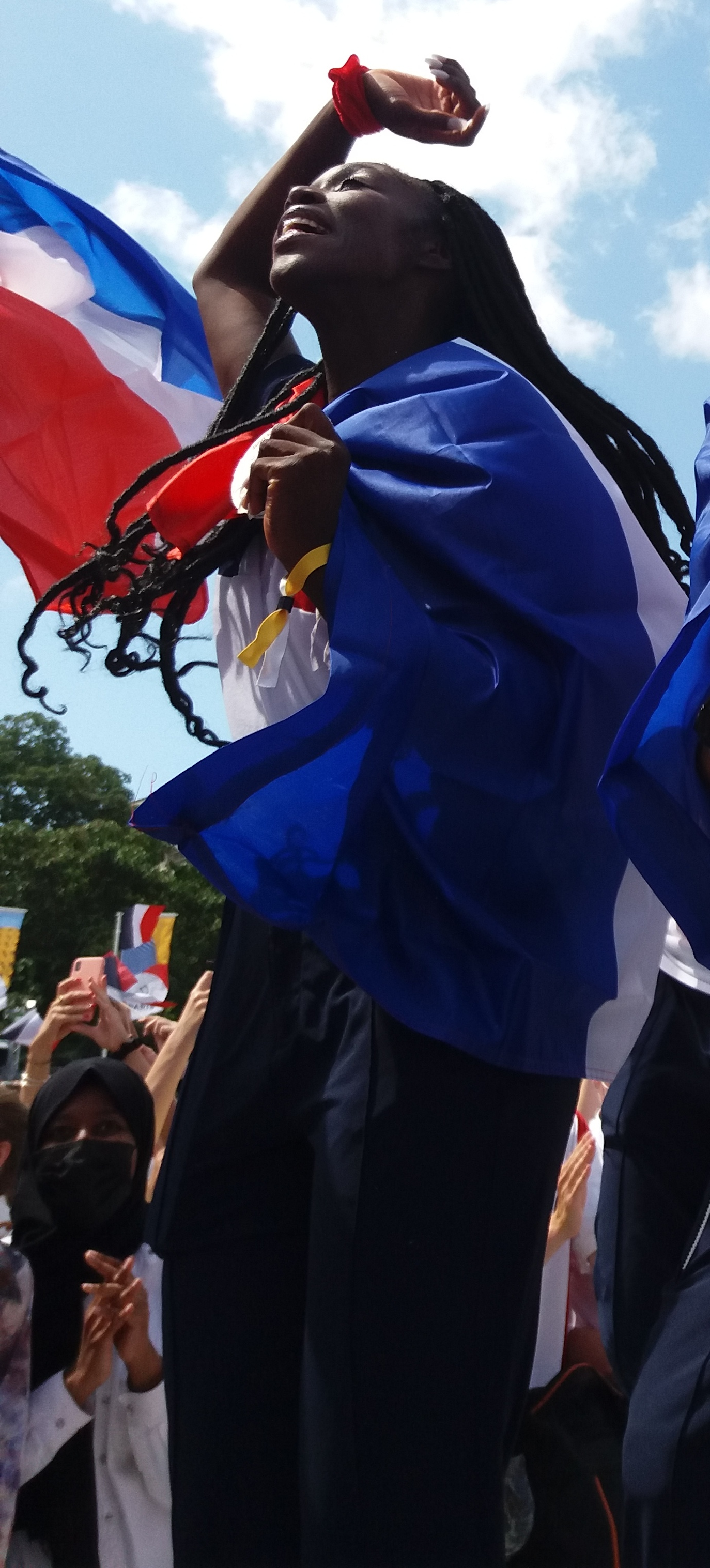
- Konde in 2021
- Born: 30 July 1999 (age 27)
- Height: 174 cm (5 ft 9 in)
- Weight: 66 kg (146 lb; 10 st 6 lb)

Rugby union career
- Position: Centre
Senior career
| Years | Team | Apps | (Points) |
| 2022– | Stade Bordelais | | (0) |
International career
| Years | Team | Apps | (Points) |
| 2020– | France | 19 | (25) |
National sevens team
| Years | Team | | Comps |
- France
Medal record
Women's rugby sevens
Representing France
Summer Olympics
| Silver medal – second place | 2020 Tokyo | Team competition |

Nassira Konde (born 30 July 1999) is a French rugby union and sevens player. She plays as a Centre for Stade Bordelais, and for France women's national rugby union team. She won a silver medal with the French sevens team at the Tokyo Olympics. She has won the Élite 1 competition with Stade Bordelais in 2023, 2024, 2025 and 2026.

== Rugby career ==
Konde played for the AC Bobigny club. In 2019, she was contracted by the French Rugby Federation to join the women's national sevens side.

She was selected for the French XVs team to the 2020 Six Nations tournament.

In 2021, she was selected for the French sevens side to the Tokyo Olympics as a reserve player. She subsequently replaced, Joanna Grisez, who withdrew shortly before the Games due to a muscular problem. She won a silver medal at the competition.

Konde won the 2022–2023 Élite 1 championship with Stade Bordelais, she notably participated in the victorious final against Blagnac SC on 10 June 2023. Her side ended the season with twelve victories in thirteen matches.

In 2024, she helped Stade Bordelais retain their title for the 2023–2024 season, she featured in ten of their thirteen matches. She repeated the same feat the following season, when Stade Bordelais won the Élite 1 Championship again (She was injured during the 2024 Six Nations tournament and did not participate in the final).

On 2 August 2025, she was named in the French side to the Women's Rugby World Cup in England.
