= Wafer (disambiguation) =

Wafer is a thin, crisp type of biscuit.

Wafer may also refer to:

- Wafer (electronics), a thin slice of semiconductor material used in electronics
- Wafer (surname), an English surname
