= Élisa Riffonneau =

French rugby union player, born 26 November 2003

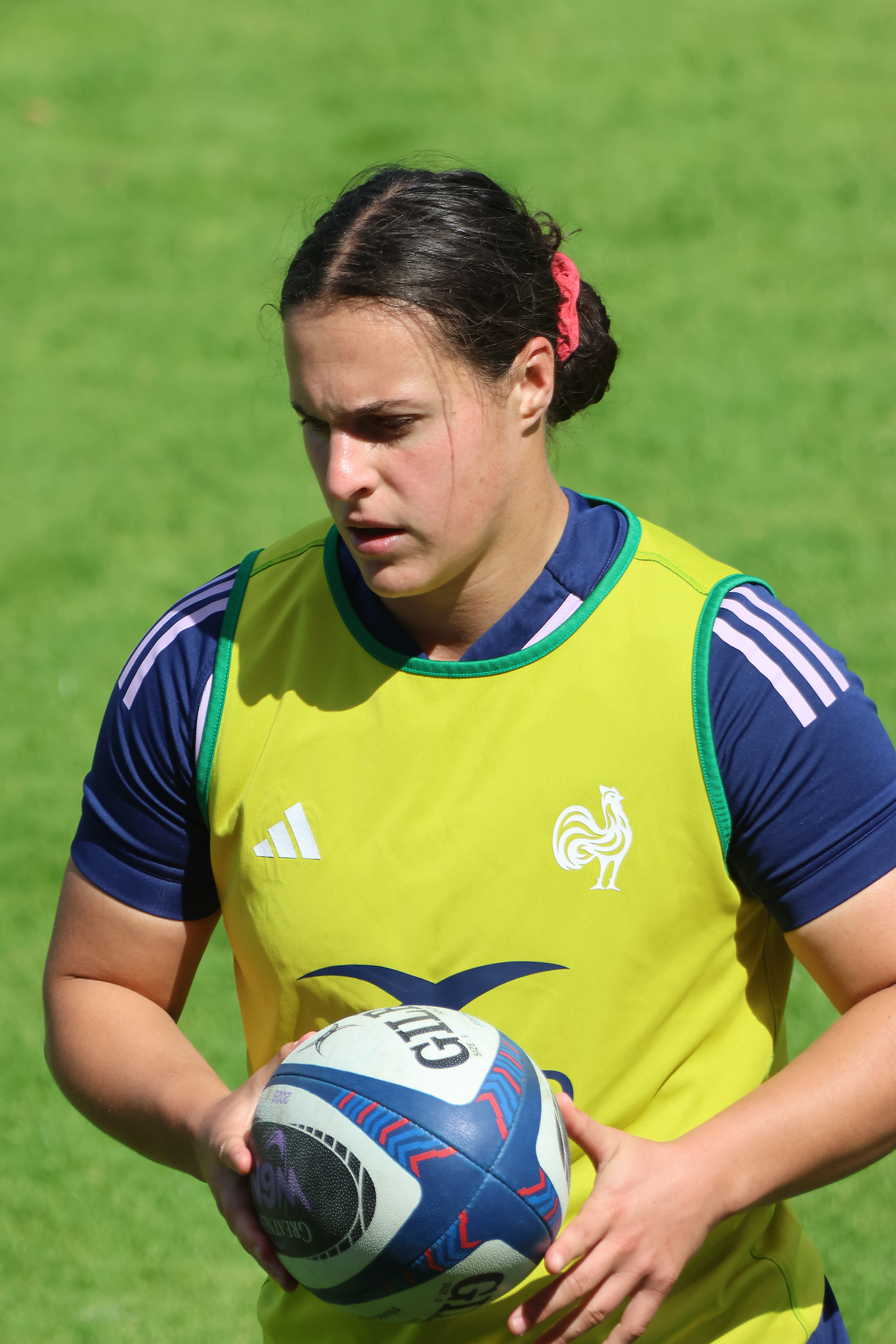
- Born: 26 November 2003 (age 22) Joué-lès-Tours, France
- Height: 165 cm (5 ft 5 in)

Rugby union career
- Position: Hooker
Senior career
Years	Team	Apps	(Points)
2021–2023	Stade Rennais		(0)
2023–2024	Trailfinders	16	(5)
2024–	FC Grenoble Amazones		(0)
International career
Years	Team	Apps	(Points)
2023–	France	20	(10)

Élisa Riffonneau (born 26 November 2003) is a French international rugby union player who plays as a hooker.

== Early life and education ==
Originally from Joué-lès-Tours (Indre-et-Loire), Riffonneau started playing rugby at the age of 6 with US Joué. She briefly switched to handball, which she played for five years, before returning to rugby after missing selection for the Pôle Espoirs in Orléans. Feeling more comfortable in rugby, she decided to pursue it seriously.

Riffonneau attended Joliot-Curie High School, then Chateaubriand High School in Rennes, graduating with the highest honors. Thanks to her status as a high-level athlete, she was admitted to Sciences Po Rennes, where she benefits from an adapted program allowing her to combine her studies and rugby career.

== Rugby career ==
=== Club career ===
After playing for Stade Rennais Rugby from 2018 to 2023, Riffonneau joined the Ealing Trailfinders Women in England for the 2023–2024 season. She was the only French international competing in the English league that season.

In 2024, Riffonneau returned to France and signed with the FC Grenoble Amazones.

=== International career ===
Riffonneau signed a professional contract with the French Rugby Federation in 2023.

Riffonneau made her debut for the France women's national team in April 2023 during the Women's Six Nations Championship against Ireland. Later that year, she participated in the inaugural WXV tournament in New Zealand, where she scored her first international try against Australia.

In 2024, Riffonneau was again selected for the Women's Six Nations Championship, playing in four matches and scoring one try. She was selected in the 2024 WXV tournament.

In 2025, Riffonneau was selected for the Women's Six Nations Championship. She played 4 out of 5 matches. On 2 August 2025, she was named in the French side to the Women's Rugby World Cup in England.
