= Aoife Wafer =

Ireland international rugby union player

- Born: 25 March 2003 (age 23) Ballygarrett, County Wexford, Ireland
- Height: 170 cm (5 ft 7 in)

Rugby union career
- Position(s): Flanker, No8
Amateur team(s)
| Years | Team | Apps | (Points) |
| | Enniscorthy RFC | | (0) |
Senior career
| Years | Team | Apps | (Points) |
| –2025 | Blackrock College RFC | | |
| –2025 | Leinster | | |
| –2025 | Wolfhounds | | |
| 2025– | Harlequins | | |
International career
| Years | Team | Apps | (Points) |
| 2022– | Ireland | 16 | (50) |
- Correct as of 14 September 2025

Aoife Wafer (born 25 March 2003) is an Irish rugby union player who plays for Harlequins Women as a Flanker.

== Early life ==
From Ballygarrett, County Wexford, she started playing rugby with the boys’ team at Gorey RFC at the age of six, and played through the age groups until Under-12, when she couldn't play with them any longer and had to switch to the girls’ Under-15 team. Initially a scrum half, she later moved to Enniscorthy RFC at Under-16 level in 2018 and transitioned to the back-row.

== Career ==
Wafer played for Blackrock College and Leinster Rugby, and became Ireland captain at Under-18 level. She was also invited into the Ireland sevens programme straight after her Leaving Certificate. Wafer earned her first Ireland cap in a 29–8 win against Italy in the 2022 Women's Six Nations Championship in Musgrave Park. However, due to injury her second appearance for the national senior side didn't arrive until October 2023, when she came off the bench in the 53rd minute in a 15–13 victory over Spain in Dubai.

Wafer made her first Ireland start in the 2024 Women's Six Nations Championship. She scored a try against France in Le Mans and showed tactical flexibility switching from openside flanker to number eight for Ireland's attacking scrums. Wafer was named Ireland's player of the tournament as Ireland finished third in the championship to qualify for the 2025 World Cup. During the tournament, Wafer's five line-breaks meant she made more than any non-English player, while her two tries ensured she finished as her country's second top try-scorer, behind Katie Corrigan and only Beibhinn Parsons gained more metres with ball in hand than Wafer.

Wafer was selected in the Ireland squad to compete at the WXV1 tournament in Canada in September 2024. She scored twice as they beat New Zealand at the competition on 29 September 2024. Wafer was named in the World Dream Team at the 2024 World Rugby Awards in Monaco.

Wafer was named in Ireland's side for the 2025 Six Nations Championship in March 2025 and was later named in the Team of the Championship and awarded the overall Player of the Championship award ahead of England winger Abby Dow, France second-row Manaé Feleu, and Scotland back-row Evie Gallagher. In May 2025, it was announced that Wafer had signed for English team Harlequins in Premiership Women's Rugby from the 2025-26 Season. On 11 August, she was selected in the Irish squad to the Rugby World Cup. She continued with Ireland for their 2026 Six Nations Championship campaign and was again named the Player of the Championship having scored five tries, the first woman to win the award in consecutive years.

== Personal life ==
She is a University College Dublin physiotherapy student. Her younger sister Orla has played rugby for the Ireland Under-20s side.
