= Vittoria Ostuni Minuzzi =

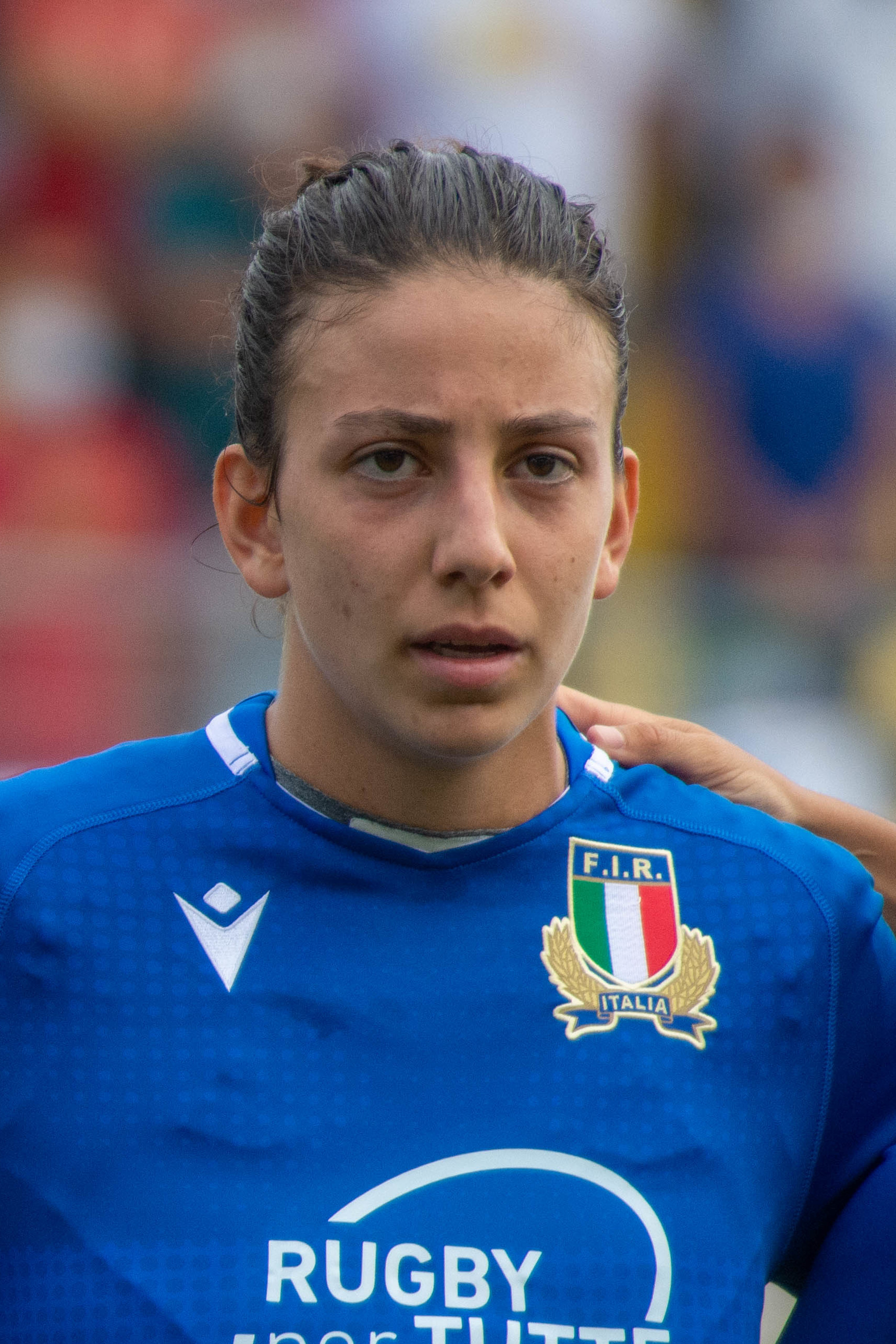
- Ostuni Minuzzi in 2021.
- Born: 6 December 2001 (age 24)
- Height: 178 cm (5 ft 10 in)
- Weight: 64 kg (141 lb; 10 st 1 lb)

Rugby union career
- Position: Outside Back
Senior career
Years	Team	Apps	(Points)
2017–	Valsugana		(0)
International career
Years	Team	Apps	(Points)
2020–	Italy	44	(85)

Vittoria Ostuni Minuzzi (born 6 December 2001) is an Italian rugby union player. She plays for Italy internationally and for Valsugana at club level. She competed at the delayed 2021 Rugby World Cup.

== Early life and career ==
Ostuni Minuzzi are the surnames of her paternal grandparents, her father is an oil salesman and olive pruner, while her mother is a hygienist doctor. She started playing rugby from the age of 5 but switched to athletics at 10 after she received a knee injury that required surgery. She returned to rugby at 12 and joined Valsugana's youth team.

== Rugby career ==
In 2017, she made her debut for Valsugana's senior team before she turned 16, they reached the championship final but were defeated by Colorno. The following season they reached the final of Serie A again, but were defeated, on this occasion it was against Villorba.

Ostuni Minuzzi made her international debut for Italy against Wales in Cardiff, she started in their opening match of the 2020 Six Nations tournament.

In 2021, she was initially named to start against England in the Six Nations but was withdrawn at the last minute. She eventually scored her first international try during Italy's match against Scotland in Glasgow. She started in every game since then, and only missed 7 minutes in Italy's successful World Cup qualification campaign in September 2021.

She was selected in the Italian side to the delayed 2021 Rugby World Cup in New Zealand in 2022 and featured in every match. She shocked Canada during their Pool B match when she scored a try with her first touch of the ball, crossing the line barely a minute after kick-off; however Italy were defeated 22–12.

She started in Italy's opening match of the 2024 Women's Six Nations Championship, they were left scoreless in the game against England at Stadio Sergio Lanfranchi in Parma. She featured in her sides 22–20 loss to Wales in the final round of the tournament.

She was selected in Italy's squad for the Women's Six Nations tournament on 5 March 2025. She started for Italy in their opening match against England, her side went down 38–5. On 11 August 2025, she was named in the Italian side to the Women's Rugby World Cup in England.
