= Fiona McIntosh (rugby union) =

Scotland international rugby union player

- Born: 25 October 1999 (age 27)
- Height: 180 cm (5 ft 11 in)
- Weight: 77 kg (12 st 2 lb)
- University: St George's, University of London; King's College London

Rugby union career
- Position: Lock
- Current team: Saracens Women
Amateur team(s)
Years	Team	Apps	(Points)
–	Old Alleynians	–	(–)
–	Kent Divas	–	(–)
–	Hartpury College	–	(–)
Senior career
Years	Team	Apps	(Points)
2018–2020	Richmond Women	21	(5)
2020–2025	Saracens Women	50	(0)
2024	→ Edinburgh Women (loan)	3	(0)
2025–	Harlequins		
- Correct as of 16 January 2025
International career
Years	Team	Apps	(Points)
2019–20	England U20s	–	(–)
2024–	Scotland	1	(0)
- Correct as of 13 April 2024

Fiona McIntosh is an English-born Scottish rugby union player, who currently plays as a lock for Saracens Women in Premiership Women's Rugby, the top-tier competition of women's rugby union in England, and the Scotland national team.

== Club career ==
McIntosh started playing rugby union at the age of seven, firstly in the minis section at Old Alleynians, and later for Kent Divas. As a teenager, she took a three-year hiatus from the sport to concentrate on rowing, before returning to rugby while attending Hartpury College. At the age of 18, McIntosh joined Richmond Women, and made her senior rugby debut in September 2018, in a match against Firwood Waterloo during the 2018–19 Premier 15s season. She continued to build her experience with the first team over the next two years, until the club was omitted from the Premier 15s in 2020, following a restructure of the competition.

In 2020, McIntosh signed with fellow top-flight London-based club Saracens. She established herself as a first-choice lock over the course of the 2021–22 Premier 15s campaign, helping the club to its fourth consecutive table-topping finish in the regular season, and then starting in the play-off final, where Saracens were crowned champions after defeating Exeter Chiefs by a score of 43–21.

Halfway through the 2023–24 Premiership Women's Rugby season, McIntosh spent time on loan at Edinburgh, having been named by the Scottish Rugby Union as one of the 11 Scotland-qualified players available for selection to compete in the 2023–24 Celtic Challenge.

In May 2025, she signed for Harlequins Women for the 2025–26 Premiership Women's Rugby season.

== International career ==
McIntosh progressed through the Rugby Football Union youth pathways, being named in England Talent Development Group whilst still a student. She subsequently played for the England U20s during the 2019–20 season.

In 2023, McIntosh received her first senior call-up with the Scotland squad, qualifying to represent the nation via ancestry. She was selected as part of the country's 2023 WXV campaign, although she did not feature in any of the matches. The following year, she was retained in the Scotland squad ahead of the 2024 Women's Six Nations Championship. McIntosh made her test debut on 13 April 2024, starting in the second row against the country of her birth, England.

== Personal life and education ==
McIntosh studied at St George's, University of London between 2018 and 2021, earning a bachelor's degree in biomedical science. She then continued her education at King's College London, from where she graduated in 2023, with a master's degree in global health.
