= Wever (disambiguation) =

Wever is a Dutch surname.

Wever may also refer to:

- Wever, Iowa, unincorporated community United States
- Wever (Glabbeek), village in Glabbeek, Belgium
