= Marine Ménager =

France international rugby union player

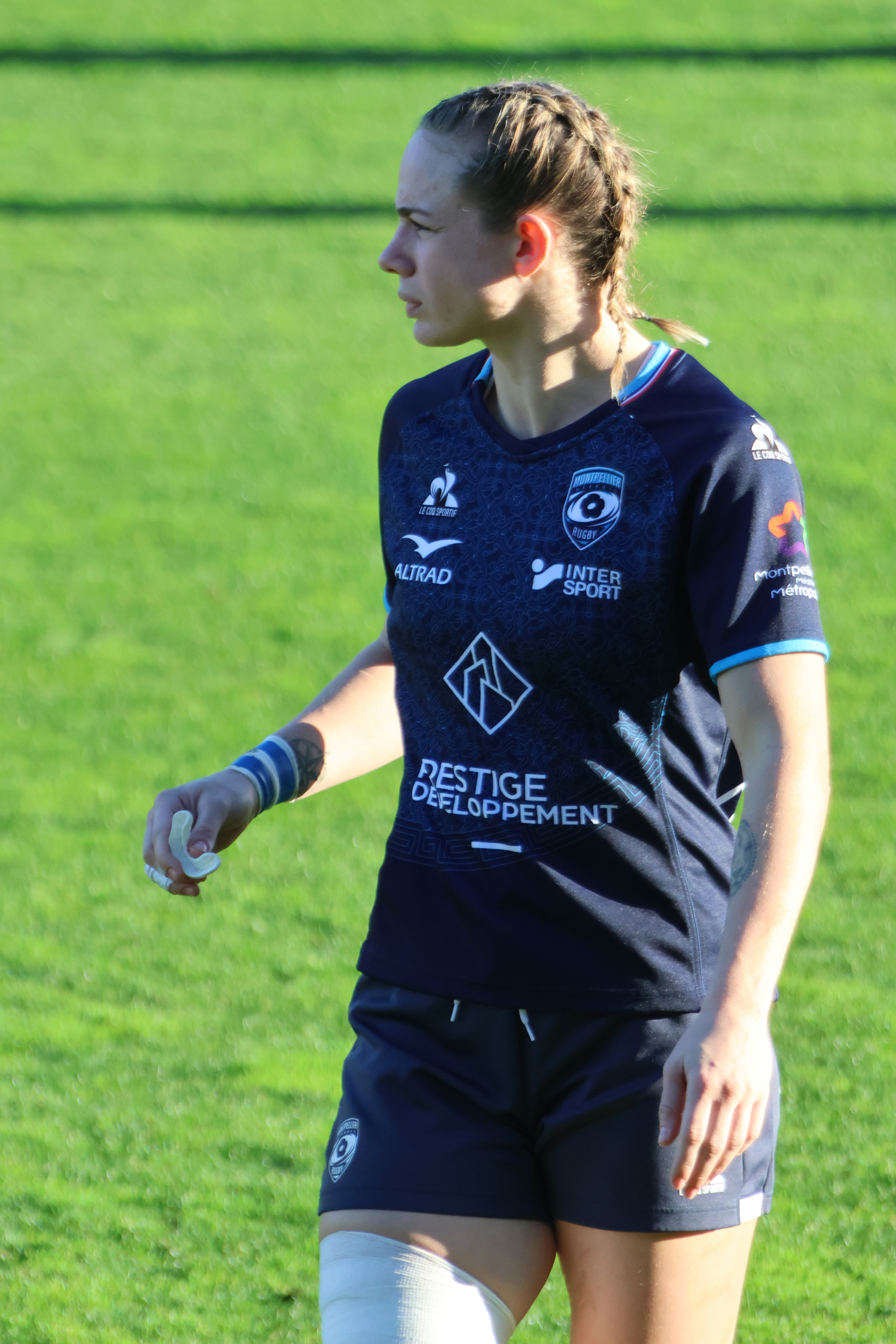
- Marine Ménager in 2024
- Born: 26 July 1996 (age 30)
- Height: 178 cm (5 ft 10 in)

Rugby union career
- Position: Wing
Senior career
Years	Team	Apps	(Points)
2018–	Montpellier HR		(0)
International career
Years	Team	Apps	(Points)
2016–	France	64	(95)

Marine Ménager (born 26 July 1996) is a French rugby union player who plays as a winger for the France women's national rugby union team and Montpellier Hérault Rugby. She competed at the 2021 Rugby World Cup, which was played in late 2022 due to COVID-19-related delays.

== Career ==
She started playing rugby aged 7 for LMRC Villeneuve d'Ascq. She also competed in judo for a year. Along with her twin sister Romane Ménager she made her debut in the league aged 18 for Lille MRCV. In 2016 Marine joined Romane in playing for the French national team.

On 23 May 2018 both sisters joined Montpelier, having played for 14 years with Lille MRC Villeneuvois and won the Élite 1 championship in 2016.

Both sisters were named in France's fifteens team for the 2021 Rugby World Cup in New Zealand. Marine Ménager was highlighted as one of the form players in the group stages of the tournament. Both sisters started in the French 39–3 win over Italy in the quarter-final.

In November 2024, she won the International Rugby Players Women's Try of the Year award at the World Rugby Awards, for a try she scored against Canada in September 2024 at the WXV.

She was named in France's side for the 2025 Women's Six Nations Championship on 7 March. On 2 August, she was named in the French side to the 2025 Women's Rugby World Cup.
