= Romane Ménager =

France international rugby union player

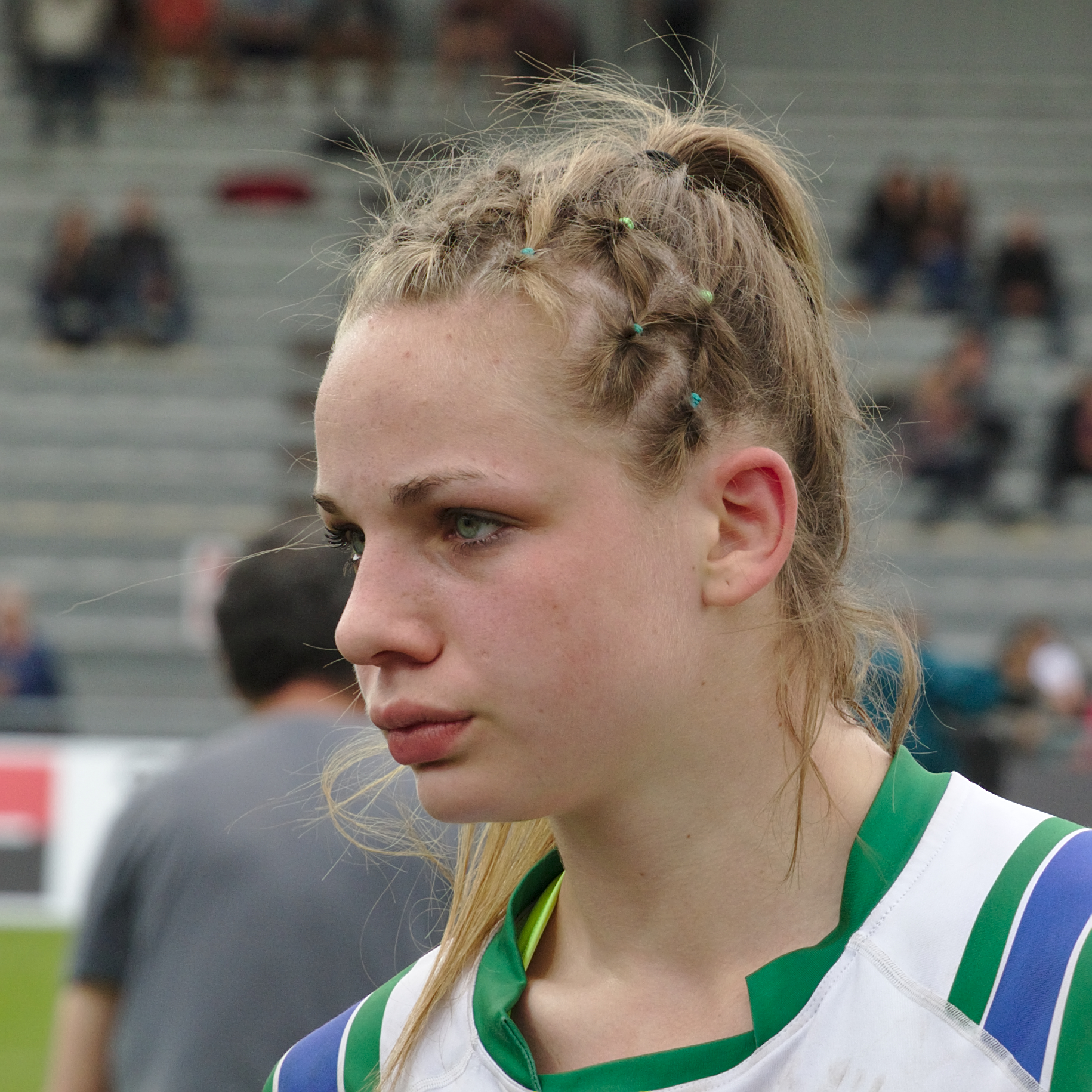
- Romane Ménager in 2015
- Born: 26 July 1996 (age 30)
- Height: 1.78 m (5 ft 10 in)
- Weight: 77 kg (170 lb)

Rugby union career
- Position: Number 8
International career
Years	Team	Apps	(Points)
2015-Present	France		(0)

Romane Ménager (born 26 July 1996) is a French rugby union player who plays for the France women's national rugby union team and Montpellier Hérault Rugby.

== Career ==
She started playing rugby aged 7 for LMRC Villeneuve d'Ascq. Along with her twin sister Marine Ménager she made her debut in the league aged 18 for Lille MRCV. In 2016 Marine joined Romane in playing for the French national team. Romane had made her France debut the previous year. Romane was selected in the French squad for the 2017 Rugby World Cup.

On 23 May 2018 both sisters joined Montpelier having played for 14 years with Lille MRC Villeneuvois and won the Élite 1 championship in 2016.

Both sisters were named in France's fifteens team for the 2021 Rugby World Cup in New Zealand. Both sisters started in the French 39–3 win over Italy in the quarter-final.
