= Annaëlle Deshayes =

French rugby player

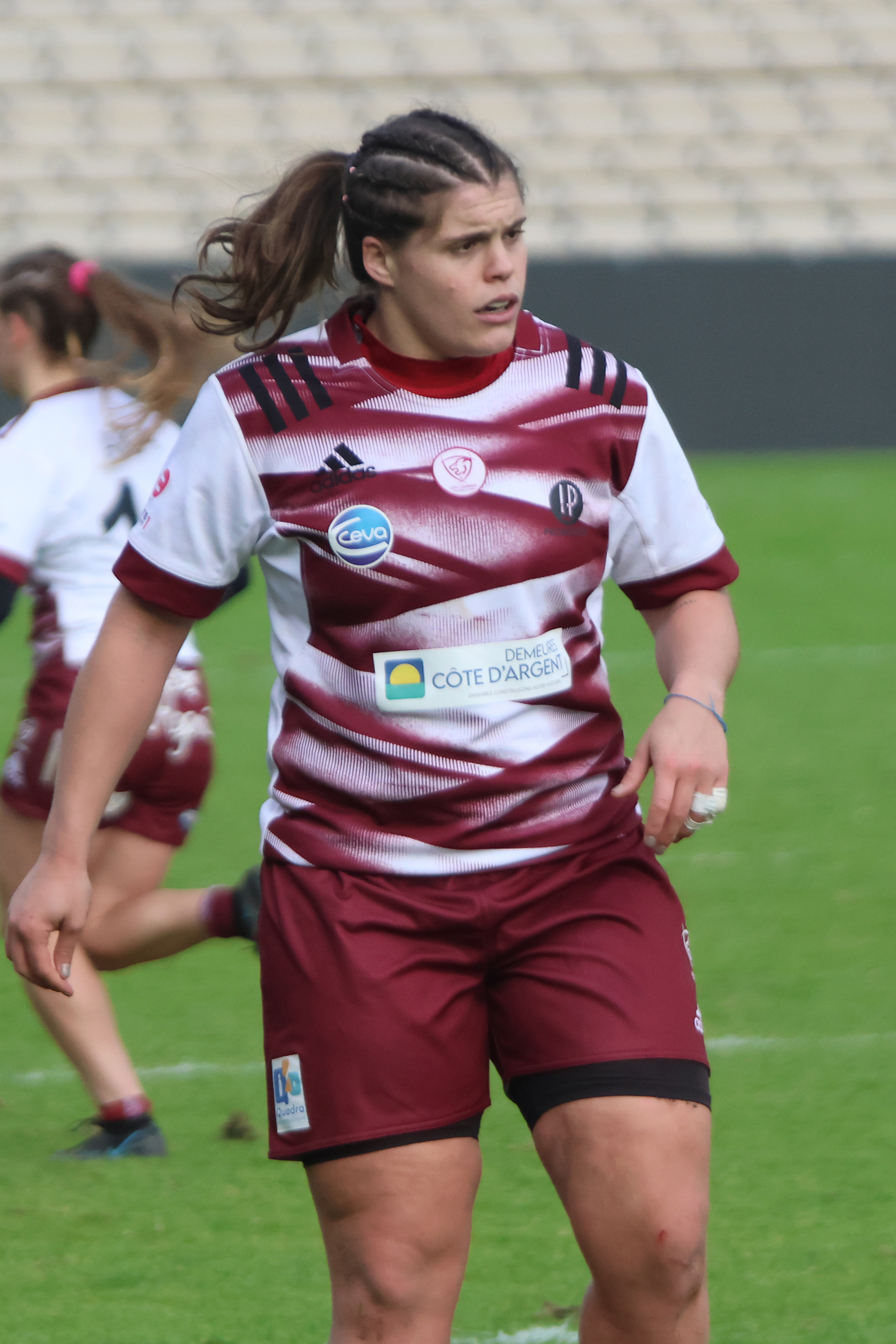
- Deshayes with Stade Bordelais
- Born: 16 March 1996 (age 30)
- Height: 1.75 m (5 ft 9 in)
- Weight: 94 kg (207 lb)

Rugby union career
- Position: Prop
Senior career
Years	Team	Apps	(Points)
2022–	Stade Bordelais		
International career
Years	Team	Apps	(Points)
2016–Present	France	55	(50)

Annaëlle Deshayes (born 16 March 1996) is a French rugby union player. She plays for the France women's national rugby union team and Lyon Olympique Universitaire as a prop forward.

== Rugby career ==
From Yvetot, in the Seine-Maritime department in the Normandy region in northern France, she made her debut for the France senior side in 2016 whilst playing for Caen Rugby Club. In 2017 she left Caen for Rouen. In 2020 he joined Lyon Olympique Universitaire.

She was named in France's team for the delayed 2021 Rugby World Cup in New Zealand.

On 2 August 2025, she was selected in the French side to the Women's Rugby World Cup in England.
