= Wever =

Wever, De Wever, and Wevers are surnames. Notable people with the surname include:

== Wever ==
- Anne-Marie Durand-Wever (1889–1970), German gynecologist
- Clark R. Wever (1835–1874), American Union Civil War brevet brigadier general
- Elfriede Wever (1900–1941), German Olympic runner
- John M. Wever (1847–1914), US politician
- Merritt Wever (born 1980), US actress
- Ned Wever (1902–1984), American radio and stage actor
- Robert Wever (fl. 1550s), English poet
- Stefan Wever (1958–2022), German baseball player
- Walther Wever (general) (1887–1936), German Luftwaffe Commander
- Walther Wever (pilot) (1923–1945), German Luftwaffe pilot

== De Wever ==
- Bart De Wever (born 1970), Flemish politician
- Frans de Wever (1869–1940), Dutch physician

== Wevers ==
- John William Wevers (1919–2010), septuagintal scholar
- Jurgen Wevers (born 1979), Dutch footballer
- Lieke Wevers (born 1991), Dutch artistic gymnast
- Lydia Wevers (1950–2021), New Zealand literary critic
- Maarten Wevers (born 1952), Dutch-born New Zealand politician
- Olivier Wevers, founder of the Whim W'Him dance company in Seattle
- Paul Wevers (1907–1941), German canoeist
- Sanne Wevers (born 1991), Dutch artistic gymnast
