= Sara Seye =

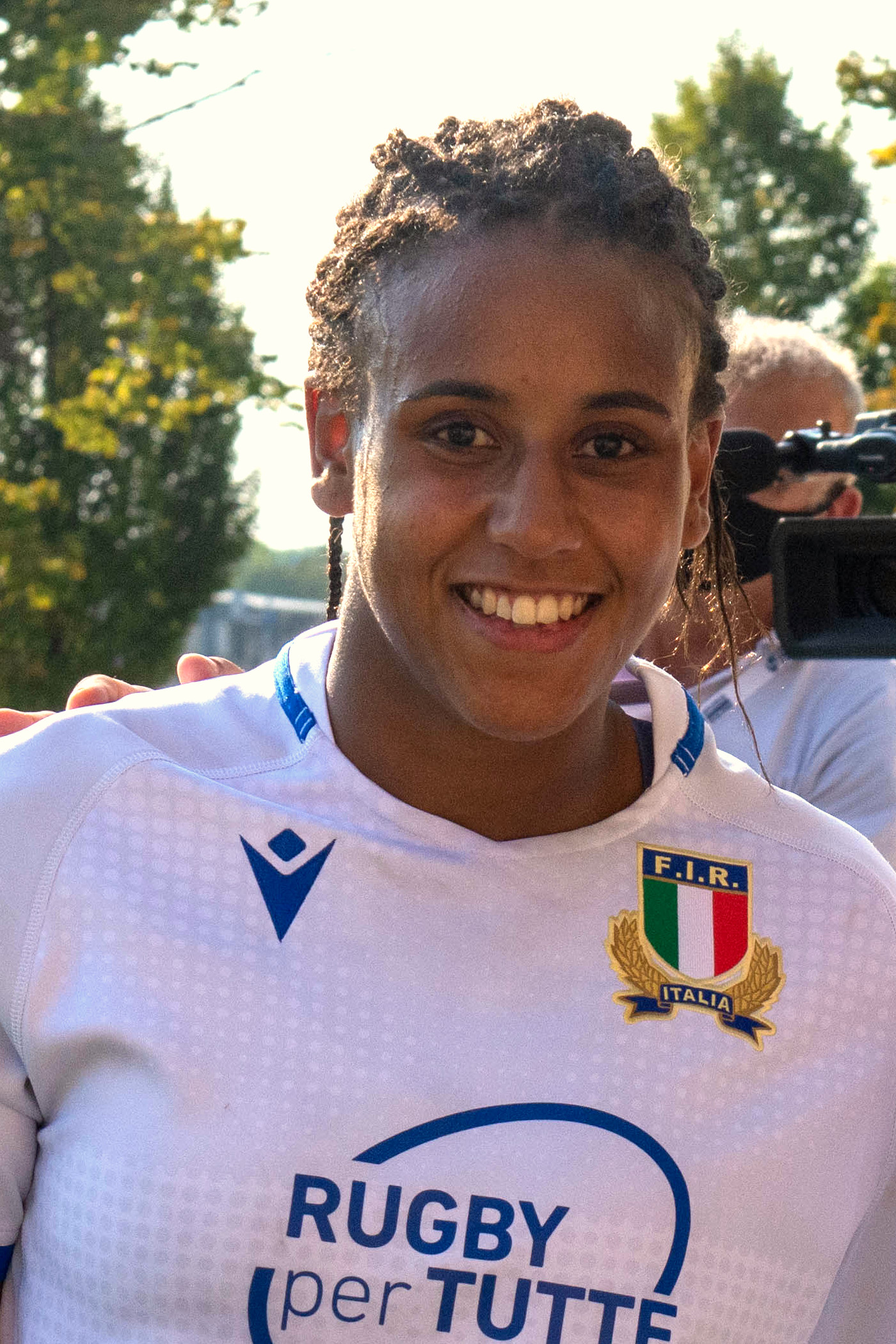
- Seye in 2021.
- Born: 26 August 2000 (age 26)
- Height: 167 cm (5 ft 6 in)
- Weight: 77 kg (170 lb; 12 st 2 lb)

Rugby union career
- Position: Prop
Senior career
Years	Team	Apps	(Points)
2018–2019	Hove		(0)
2019–2020	Wasps	6	(0)
2020–2023	Calvisano		(0)
2023–	Trailfinders		(0)
International career
Years	Team	Apps	(Points)
2021–	Italy	37	(5)

Sara Seye (born 26 August 2000) is an Italian rugby union player. She plays Prop for Ealing Trailfinders in the Premiership Women's Rugby competition and for Italy women's national rugby union team at an international level.

== Rugby career ==
Seye played for CUS Brescia's youth team, she later played club rugby for Hove in England from 2018 to 2019. She went on to play for Wasps in the Premier 15s, she only played six matches for the side after the 2019–20 season was cancelled due to the COVID-19 pandemic.

She returned to Italy and played for Calvisano from 2020 to 2023.

In September 2021 she made her international debut for Italy against Scotland during the European qualification tournament for the 2021 Rugby World Cup; a year later she was included in the squad for the delayed Rugby World Cup in New Zealand.

In 2023 she moved to England to play for Ealing Trailfinders, she later extended her contract in 2025.

In August 2025, she was named in the Italian side for the Women's Rugby World Cup in England.
