= Assia Khalfaoui =

France international rugby union player

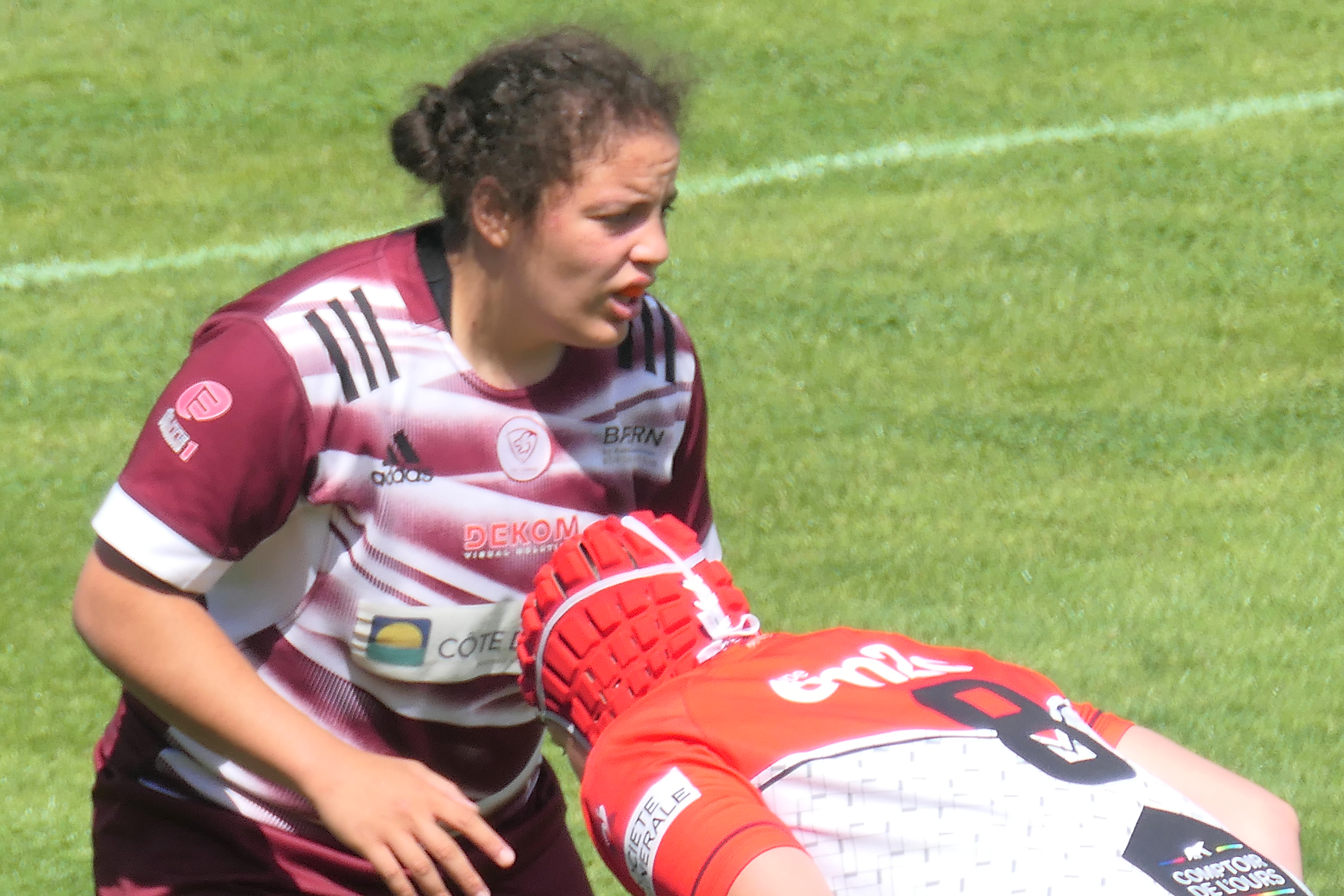
- Khalfaoui in 2022
- Born: 24 March 2001 (age 25)
- Height: 1.68 m (5 ft 6 in)

Rugby union career
- Position: Prop
International career
Years	Team	Apps	(Points)
2022–	France	37	(10)

Assia Khalfaoui (born 24 March 2001) is a French rugby union player. She plays for the France women's national rugby union team and Stade Bordelais as a prop forward.

== Personal life ==
She was born in Pont-du-Casse in the Lot-et-Garonne department in south-western France. She signed for Stade Bordelais aged 18 after playing initially for SU Agen Lot-et-Garonne.

== Career ==
She made her international debut for France on 27 March 2022 in Grenoble, in a 39-6 French victory against Italy. She was named in France's team for the 2021 Rugby World Cup in New Zealand, which was delayed by one year due to the COVID-19 pandemic.

On 2 August 2025, she was selected in the French side to the Women's Rugby World Cup in England.
