= Emma Stevanin =

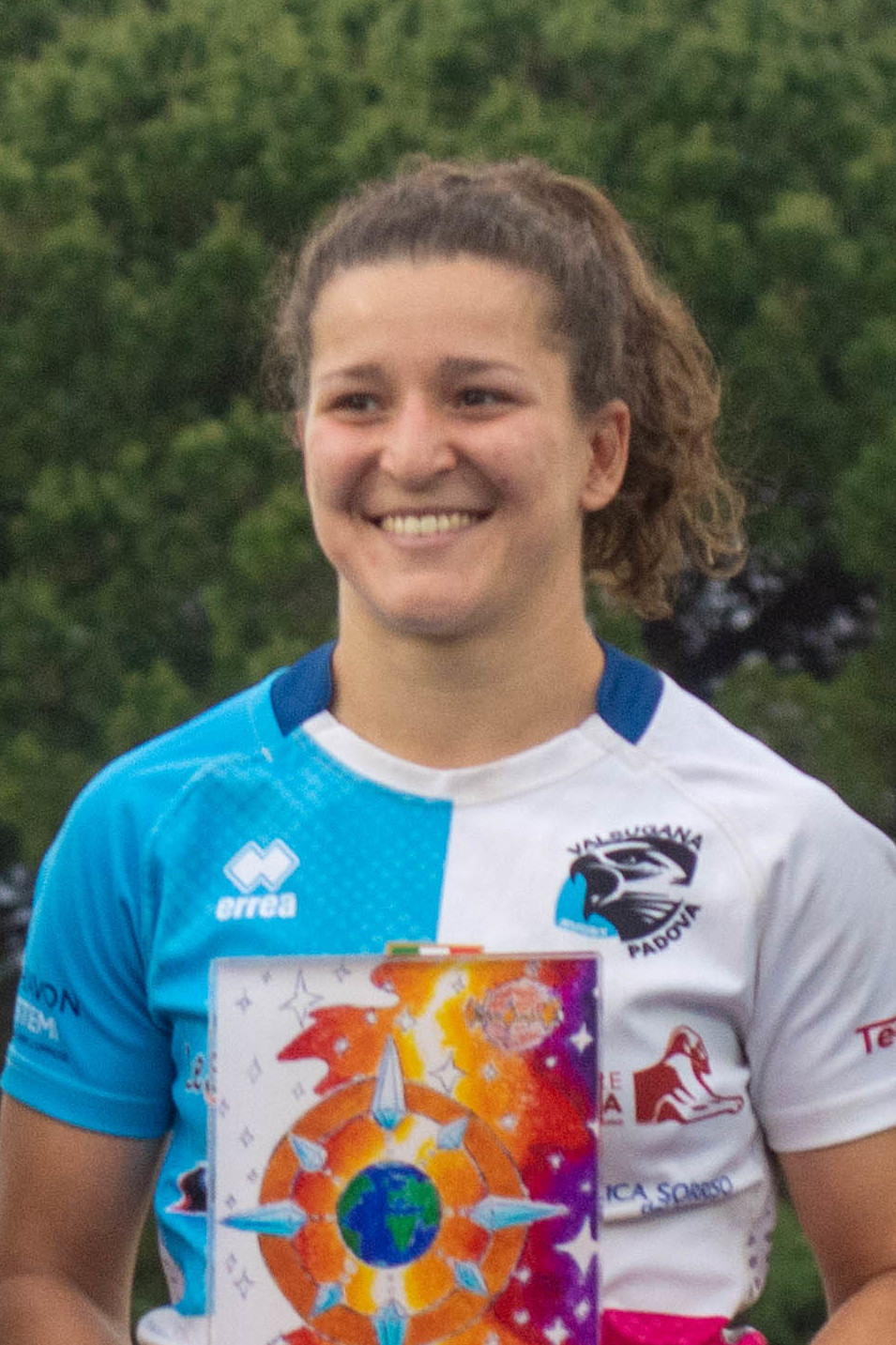
- Stevanin in 2023.
- Born: 11 April 2002 (age 24)
- Height: 167 cm (5 ft 6 in)
- Weight: 73 kg (161 lb; 11 st 7 lb)

Rugby union career
- Position: Fly-half
Senior career
Years	Team	Apps	(Points)
2021–	Valsugana		(0)
International career
Years	Team	Apps	(Points)
2022–	Italy	27	(5)

Emma Stevanin (born 11 April 2002) is an Italian rugby union player. She plays Fly-half for Italy, and for Valsugana.

== Career ==
Stevanin played for Badia's youth team. She moved to Ferrara in 2019, but after the closure of the women's team a year later, she then joined Valsugana in Padua.

She made her Serie A Elite debut in 2021 and was part of the team that won the Italian championship at the end of the season.

She was called up to the Italian women's national team for the Six Nations tournament. She made her international debut in a warm-up match against France in Nice in September 2022 ahead of the Rugby World Cup. She also played in the second game against France, in Biella a week later, her side won 26–19. She was subsequently included in the squad selected to take part in the 2021 Rugby World Cup.

She helped Valsugana become national champions once again in 2023.

Stevanin was named in the Italian squad for the 2025 Rugby World Cup in England.
