= Katie Corrigan =

Irish rugby union player

- Born: 22 August 2005 (age 21) Ireland
- Height: 173 cm (5 ft 8 in)
- Weight: 73 kg (161 lb)

Rugby union career
- Position: Wing
Senior career
| Years | Team | Apps | (Points) |
| | Old Belvedere | | (0) |
International career
| Years | Team | Apps | (Points) |
| 2024–present | Ireland | 5 | (10) |

Katie Corrigan (born 22 August 2005) is an Irish rugby union player who plays as a wing.

== Early life ==
Corrigan is from Donard, in County Wicklow. She started playing as a youngster at the Tullow club in County Carlow.

== Career ==
She played for Leinster at under-18 level and Old Belvedere as a winger.

She made her Ireland debut in the 2024 Women's Six Nations Championship aged 18 years-old. Ireland finished third in the championship to qualify for the 2025 World Cup and Corrigan was their top try scorer in the tournament.

Corrigan was named in Ireland's side for the 2025 Six Nations Championship in March.
