= Joanna Grisez =

French rugby sevens player

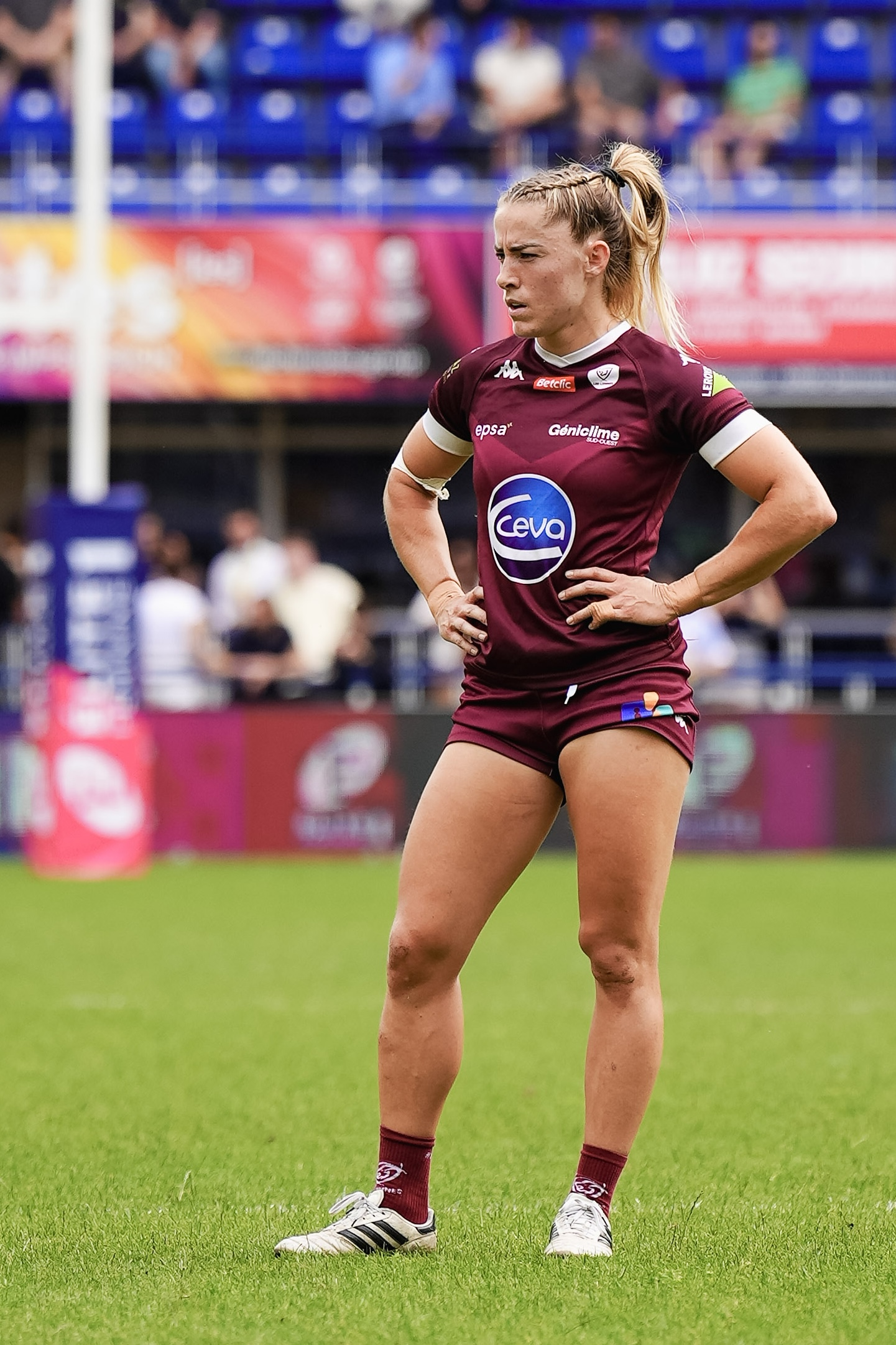
- Grisez with Stade Bordelais in 2025
- Born: 5 October 1996 (age 30) Colombes, France
- Height: 1.73 m (5 ft 8 in)
- Weight: 56 kg (123 lb)

Rugby union career
- Position: Wing
International career
Years	Team	Apps	(Points)
2022–	France	13	(60)
National sevens team
Years	Team		Comps
- France
Medal record
Women's rugby sevens
Representing France
Rugby World Cup Sevens
Bronze medal – third place	2022 Cape Town	Team competition
Olympic Games
Silver medal – second place	2020 Tokyo	Team competition

Joanna Grisez (born 5 October 1996) is a French rugby union, and sevens player. She represented France at the 2024 Summer Olympics. She has also competed for France's fifteens team at the 2021 and 2025 Women's Rugby World Cups.

== Rugby career ==
=== Sevens ===
Grisez was selected as a member of the France women's national rugby sevens team to the 2020 Summer Olympics but had to drop out at the last minute due to injury. She won a bronze medal at the 2022 Rugby World Cup Sevens.

She competed for France at the 2024 Summer Olympics.

=== XVs ===
Grisez was named in France's fifteens team for the 2021 Rugby World Cup in New Zealand.

On 2 August, she was made the French side to the 2025 Women's Rugby World Cup.
