= Lina Queyroi =

French rugby player

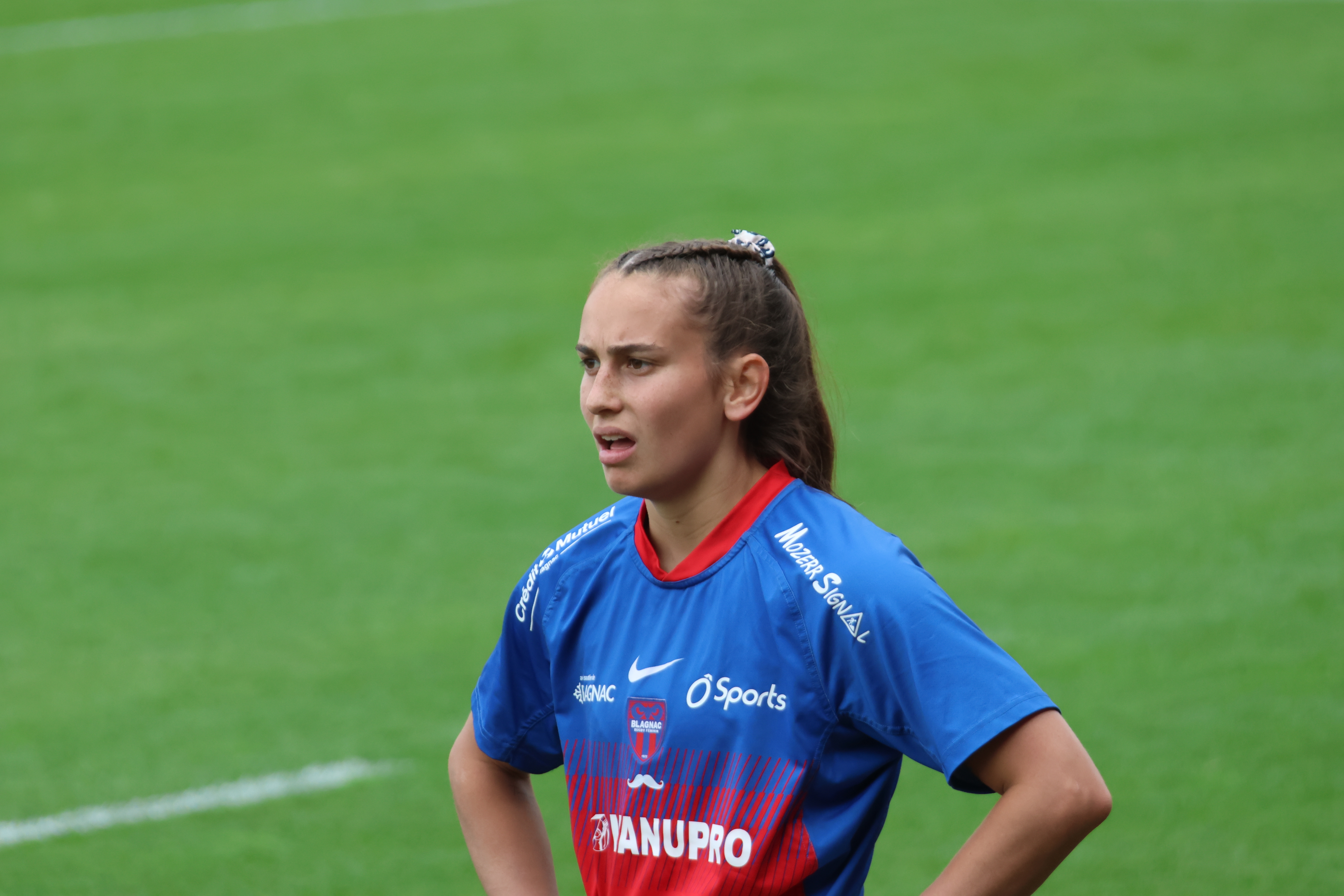
- Queyroi with Blagnac
- Born: 18 May 2001 (age 25)
- Height: 164 cm (5 ft 5 in)

Rugby union career
- Position(s): Centre, Fly-half
Senior career
Years	Team	Apps	(Points)
2019–2024	Blagnac RF		(0)
2024–	Stade Toulousain		(0)
International career
Years	Team	Apps	(Points)
2022–	France	27	(80)

Lina Queyroi (born 18 May 2001) is a French rugby union player who plays for Toulouse and France. She competed for France at the delayed 2021 Rugby World Cup and the 2025 Rugby World Cup.

== Early life ==
Queyroi attended the Saint-Yrieix-la-Perche rugby school.

== Career ==
Having made her debut in 2019 for Blagnac SCR she filled many positions as a utility player for the first couple of seasons before beginning to play regularly in the centre.

On 3 September 2022 she made her international debut for France, against Italy. She was subsequently named in France's team for the delayed 2021 Rugby World Cup in New Zealand. Queyroi kicked a second half conversion as France became the first team to reach the semi-finals with a 39–3 win over Italy.

On 7 March 2025, she was named in France's squad for the Women's Six Nations Championship. On 2 August, she was selected in the French side to the Women's Rugby World Cup in England.
