= 2025 Women's Rugby World Cup squads =

The 2025 Women's Rugby World Cup was an international rugby union tournament held in England from 22 August 2025 until 27 September 2025. Sixteen national teams competed. The tournament was administered by World Rugby, to whom each team submitted their finalised squad.

The age and number of caps for each player is stated as of 22 August 2025, the first day of the tournament.

== Overview ==
Below is a table listing all the head coaches and captains for each nation.

Team	Coach	Captain	Squad Announced
Australia	(England) Joanne Yapp	Emily Chancellor & Siokapesi Palu	4 August 2025
Brazil	(Uruguay) Emiliano Caffera	Eshyllen Coimbra	28 July 2025
Canada	(France) Kévin Rouet	Alex Tessier	24 July 2025
England	(New Zealand) John Mitchell	Zoe Aldcroft	24 July 2025
Fiji	(Wales) Ioan Cunningham	Alfreda Fisher Maria	9 August 2025
France	(France) Gaëlle Mignot & David Ortiz	Manaé Feleu	2 August 2025
Ireland	(England) Scott Bemand	Edel McMahon & Sam Monaghan	11 August 2025
Italy	(Italy) Fabio Roselli	Elisa Giordano	11 August 2025
Japan	(Canada) Lesley McKenzie	Iroha Nagata	28 July 2025
New Zealand	(New Zealand) Allan Bunting	Ruahei Demant & Kennedy Tukuafu	25 July 2025
Samoa	(Samoa) Mata'afa Ramsey Tomokino	Sui Tauaua-Pauaraisa	1 August 2025
Scotland	(Scotland) Bryan Easson	Rachel Malcolm	7 August 2025
South Africa	(South Africa) Swys de Bruin	Nolusindiso Booi	9 August 2025
Spain	(Spain) Juan González Marruecos	Laura Delgado & Alba Vinuesa	11 August 2025
United States	(Australia) Sione Fukofuka	Kate Zackary	17 July 2025
Wales	(Wales) Sean Lynn	Alex Callender & Kate Williams	11 August 2025

== Pool A ==
=== Australia ===
Head coach: (England) Jo Yapp

Australia named their final 32-player squad on 4 August 2025.

^{1} On 11 August 2025, Charlotte Caslick was ruled out of the World Cup, after failing to recover from ankle surgery. She was replaced by Manu'a Moleka.

Player	Position	Date of birth (age)	Caps	Club/province
Katalina Amosa	Hooker	26 May 2001 (aged 24)	6	(Australia) ACT Brumbies
Tania Naden	Hooker	20 February 1992 (aged 33)	25	(Australia) ACT Brumbies
Adiana Talakai	Hooker	24 February 1999 (aged 26)	18	(Australia) NSW Waratahs
Bree-Anna Browne	Prop	29 March 1997 (aged 28)	13	(Australia) Queensland Reds
Brianna Hoy	Prop	7 July 2000 (aged 25)	8	(Australia) NSW Waratahs
Eva Karpani	Prop	18 June 1996 (aged 29)	37	(Australia) Queensland Reds
Lydia Kavoa	Prop	8 November 1993 (aged 31)	9	(Australia) ACT Brumbies
Bridie O'Gorman	Prop	8 December 1998 (aged 26)	33	(Australia) NSW Waratahs
Faliki Pohiva	Prop	16 April 2001 (aged 24)	4	(Australia) NSW Waratahs
Annabelle Codey	Second row	3 February 1997 (aged 28)	7	(Australia) NSW Waratahs
Ashley Fernandez	Second row	24 October 2002 (aged 22)	4	(Australia) ACT Brumbies
Kaitlan Leaney	Second row	10 October 2000 (aged 24)	31	(Australia) NSW Waratahs
Michaela Leonard	Second row	6 March 1995 (aged 30)	38	(Australia) Western Force
Emily Chancellor (cc)	Back row	20 August 1991 (aged 34)	30	(Australia) NSW Waratahs
Piper Duck	Back row	2 April 2001 (aged 24)	18	(Australia) NSW Waratahs
Ashley Marsters	Back row	2 November 1993 (aged 31)	41	(Australia) Western Force
Siokapesi Palu (cc)	Back row	15 October 1996 (aged 28)	21	(Australia) ACT Brumbies
Tabua Tuinakauvadra	Back row	27 December 2002 (aged 22)	18	(Australia) ACT Brumbies
Layne Morgan	Scrum-half	20 April 1999 (aged 26)	36	(Australia) Queensland Reds
Samantha Wood	Scrum-half	17 July 2004 (aged 21)	7	(Australia) Western Force
Waiaria Ellis	Fly-half	11 September 2007 (aged 17)	3	(Australia) NSW Waratahs
Tia Hinds	Fly-half	5 November 2002 (aged 22)	6	(Australia) ACT Brumbies
Faitala Moleka	Fly-half	29 January 2005 (aged 20)	21	(Australia) ACT Brumbies
Georgina Friedrichs	Centre	14 April 1995 (aged 30)	34	(Australia) NSW Waratahs
Trilleen Pomare	Centre	5 April 1993 (aged 32)	40	(Australia) Western Force
Cecilia Smith	Centre	13 March 1994 (aged 31)	24	(Australia) Western Force
Manu'a Moleka^{1}	Centre	10 January 2007 (aged 18)	0	(Australia) ACT Brumbies
Desiree Miller	Wing	13 January 2002 (aged 23)	19	(Australia) NSW Waratahs
Maya Stewart	Wing	14 March 2000 (aged 25)	18	(Australia) NSW Waratahs
Caitlin Urwin	Wing	10 March 2000 (aged 25)	0	(Australia) Queensland Reds
Charlotte Caslick^{1}	Fullback	9 March 1995 (aged 30)	5	(Australia) Queensland Reds
Lori Cramer	Fullback	8 March 1993 (aged 32)	30	(Australia) Queensland Reds
Caitlyn Halse	Fullback	18 September 2006 (aged 18)	11	(Australia) NSW Waratahs

=== England ===
Head coach: (New Zealand) John Mitchell

England named their final 32-player squad on 24 July 2025.

Player	Position	Date of birth (age)	Caps	Club/province
Lark Atkin-Davies	Hooker	3 March 1995 (aged 30)	68	(England) Bristol Bears
May Campbell	Hooker	16 May 1996 (aged 29)	4	(England) Saracens
Amy Cokayne	Hooker	11 July 1996 (aged 29)	84	(England) Sale Sharks
Sarah Bern	Prop	10 July 1997 (aged 28)	73	(England) Bristol Bears
Hannah Botterman	Prop	8 June 1999 (aged 26)	58	(England) Bristol Bears
Mackenzie Carson	Prop	24 June 1998 (aged 27)	21	(England) Gloucester–Hartpury
Kelsey Clifford	Prop	11 December 2001 (aged 23)	15	(England) Saracens
Maud Muir	Prop	12 July 2001 (aged 24)	42	(England) Gloucester–Hartpury
Zoe Aldcroft (c)	Second row	19 November 1996 (aged 28)	65	(England) Gloucester–Hartpury
Rosie Galligan	Second row	30 April 1998 (aged 27)	25	(England) Saracens
Lilli Ives Campion	Second row	10 October 2003 (aged 21)	3	(England) Loughborough Lightning
Morwenna Talling	Second row	29 September 2002 (aged 22)	23	(England) Sale Sharks
Abbie Ward	Second row	27 March 1993 (aged 32)	76	(England) Bristol Bears
Abi Burton	Back row	9 March 2000 (aged 25)	3	(England) Trailfinders
Maddie Feaunati	Back row	18 May 2002 (aged 23)	17	(England) Exeter Chiefs
Sadia Kabeya	Back row	22 February 2002 (aged 23)	23	(England) Loughborough Lightning
Alex Matthews	Back row	3 August 1993 (aged 32)	76	(England) Gloucester–Hartpury
Marlie Packer	Back row	2 October 1989 (aged 35)	111	(England) Saracens
Natasha Hunt	Scrum-half	21 March 1989 (aged 36)	82	(England) Gloucester–Hartpury
Lucy Packer	Scrum-half	2 February 2000 (aged 25)	33	(England) Harlequins
Holly Aitchison	Fly-half	13 September 1997 (aged 27)	40	(England) Sale Sharks
Zoe Harrison	Fly-half	14 April 1998 (aged 27)	59	(England) Saracens
Tatyana Heard	Centre	14 January 1995 (aged 30)	31	(England) Gloucester–Hartpury
Megan Jones	Centre	28 October 1996 (aged 28)	27	(England) Trailfinders
Helena Rowland	Centre	19 September 1999 (aged 25)	41	(England) Loughborough Lightning
Emily Scarratt	Centre	8 February 1990 (aged 35)	118	(England) Loughborough Lightning
Jade Shekells	Centre	28 September 1996 (aged 28)	3	(England) Gloucester–Hartpury
Jess Breach	Wing	4 November 1997 (aged 27)	47	(England) Saracens
Abby Dow	Wing	29 September 1997 (aged 27)	54	Unattached
Claudia Moloney-MacDonald	Wing	4 January 1996 (aged 29)	35	(England) Exeter Chiefs
Ellie Kildunne	Fullback	8 September 1999 (aged 25)	53	(England) Harlequins
Emma Sing	Fullback	11 March 2001 (aged 24)	10	(England) Gloucester–Hartpury

=== Samoa ===
Head coach: (Samoa) Mata'afa Ramsey Tomokino

Samoa named their final 32-player squad on 1 August 2025.

Player	Position	Date of birth (age)	Caps	Club/province
Avau Valentina Filimaua	Hooker	4 August 2003 (aged 22)	8	(New Zealand) Linwood RFC / Canterbury / (Samoa) (Tonga) Penina Pasifika
Cathy Ulu'ulumatafolau Leuta	Hooker	27 July 2001 (aged 24)	9	(New Zealand) Papatoetoe RFC / Counties Manukau / (Samoa) (Tonga) Penina Pasifika
Faith Nonutunu	Hooker	17 July 2005 (aged 20)	0	
Denise Aiolupotea	Prop	1 October 1998 (aged 26)	6	(New Zealand) MAC Rugby / Hawkes Bay / Hurricanes Poua
Glory Aiono Samuelu	Prop	16 March 2002 (aged 23)	7	
Tori Iosefo	Prop	23 August 1995 (aged 29)	5	(New Zealand) MAC Rugby / Hawkes Bay / (Samoa) (Tonga) Penina Pasifika
Ana Mamea	Prop	23 November 2001 (aged 23)	14	(New Zealand) Papatoetoe RFC / Counties Manukau / (Samoa) (Tonga) Penina Pasifika
Ti Tauasosi	Prop	6 November 1987 (aged 37)	10	(New Zealand) Marist Old Boys / Auckland / (Samoa) (Tonga) Penina Pasifika
Demielle Onesemo-Tuilaepa	Second row	7 September 2004 (aged 20)	0	(Samoa) (Tonga) Penina Pasifika
Ana-Lise Sio	Second row	3 January 1996 (aged 29)	8	(Australia) Tuggeranong Vikings
Jayjay Taylor	Second row	22 May 1997 (aged 28)	0	
Utumalama Atonio	Back row	7 November 1999 (aged 25)	15	(New Zealand) Papatoetoe RFC / Counties Manukau
Joanna Fanene-Lolo	Back row	11 November 1998 (aged 26)	3	(New Zealand) Marist Old Boys / Auckland
Nina Foaese	Back row	24 October 1988 (aged 36)	23	(New Zealand) Norths RFC / Wellington / (Samoa) (Tonga) Penina Pasifika
Christabelle Onesemo-Tuilaepa	Back row	7 September 2004 (aged 20)	1	(Samoa) (Tonga) Penina Pasifika
Sinead Ryder	Back row	19 December 1991 (aged 33)	6	
Sui Tauaua-Pauaraisa (c)	Back row	30 October 1987 (aged 37)	24	(New Zealand) Linwood RFC / Canterbury
Ana-Maria Afuie	Scrum-half	17 April 1997 (aged 28)	6	(Australia) Sunnybank RFC
Saelua Leaula	Scrum-half	17 July 1997 (aged 28)	15	
Fa'alua Tugaga	Scrum-half	22 December 2001 (aged 23)	7	
Drenna Falaniko	Centre	30 January 2004 (aged 21)	4	(New Zealand) Petone RFC / Wellington
Madisen-Jade Iva	Centre	10 October 2004 (aged 20)	0	
Davina Lasini	Centre	31 October 1996 (aged 28)	6	(Australia) Brothers Rugby Club
Fa'asua Makisi	Centre	16 March 1994 (aged 31)	2	(New Zealand) Oriental Rongotai / Wellington
Keilamarita Pouri-Lane	Centre	9 April 1996 (aged 29)	0	(Samoa) (Tonga) Penina Pasifika
Harmony Vatau	Centre	19 April 2004 (aged 21)	7	(Australia) Endeavour Hills / (Samoa) (Tonga) Penina Pasifika
Lutia Col Aumua	Wing	23 September 2003 (aged 21)	9	
Michelle Curry	Wing	4 September 1996 (aged 28)	8	
Linda Fiafia	Wing	9 August 1993 (aged 32)	13	
Taytana Pati Ah-Cheung	Fullback	12 July 2004 (aged 21)	2	
Melina Salale	Fullback	9 July 2002 (aged 23)	1	(Samoa) (Tonga) Penina Pasifika
Karla Wright-Akeli	Fullback	15 September 2001 (aged 23)	7	(New Zealand) Ponsonby Fillies / Auckland

=== United States ===
Head coach: (Australia) Sione Fukofuka

The United States named their final 32-player squad on 17 July 2025.

^{1} On 31 August, Bulou Mataitoga was ruled out of the tournament, after sustaining an injury during a training session. She was replaced by Tess Feury.

Player	Position	Date of birth (age)	Caps	Club/province
Hope Cooper	Hooker	1 April 1998 (aged 27)	0	(United States) Bay Breakers
Paige Stathopoulos	Hooker	23 August 1993 (aged 31)	18	(England) Trailfinders / (United States) Boston Banshees
Kathryn Treder	Hooker	17 March 1996 (aged 29)	31	(England) Loughborough Lightning / (United States) Bay Breakers
Catie Benson	Prop	10 February 1992 (aged 33)	47	(England) Sale Sharks / (United States) Boston Banshees
Charli Jacoby	Prop	9 October 1989 (aged 35)	36	(England) Exeter Chiefs / (Australia) Queensland Reds
Maya Learned	Prop	8 April 1996 (aged 29)	18	(United States) Denver Onyx
Alivia Leatherman	Prop	9 August 2002 (aged 23)	7	(England) Trailfinders / (United States) Twin Cities Gemini
Hope Rogers	Prop	7 January 1993 (aged 32)	56	(England) Exeter Chiefs
Keia Mae Sagapolu	Prop	12 May 2000 (aged 25)	20	(England) Leicester Tigers / (Australia) ACT Brumbies
Emerson Allen	Second row	1 May 1999 (aged 26)	2	(United States) Twin Cities Gemini
Rachel Ehrecke	Second row	6 December 1999 (aged 25)	23	(United States) Denver Onyx
Erica Jarrell-Searcy	Second row	25 February 1999 (aged 26)	20	(England) Sale Sharks
Hallie Taufo'ou	Second row	26 May 1994 (aged 31)	28	(England) Loughborough Lightning / (United States) Denver Onyx
Tahlia Brody	Back row	10 September 1994 (aged 30)	20	(England) Leicester Tigers / (United States) Denver Onyx
Rachel Johnson	Back row	5 February 1991 (aged 34)	37	(England) Exeter Chiefs / (United States) Denver Onyx
Georgie Perris-Redding	Back row	10 January 1997 (aged 28)	16	(England) Sale Sharks
Freda Tafuna	Back row	31 August 2003 (aged 21)	14	(United States) Lindenwood University
Kate Zackary (c)	Back row	26 July 1989 (aged 36)	46	(England) Trailfinders
Cassidy Bargell	Scrum-half	28 December 1999 (aged 25)	9	(United States) Boston Banshees
Olivia Ortiz	Scrum-half	23 October 1997 (aged 27)	26	(England) Sale Sharks
Kristin Bitter	Fly-half	3 February 2001 (aged 24)	4	(United States) Denver Onyx
McKenzie Hawkins	Fly-half	8 January 1997 (aged 28)	26	(United States) Denver Onyx
Gabby Cantorna	Centre	2 August 1995 (aged 30)	33	(England) Exeter Chiefs
Joanne Fa'avesi	Centre	5 February 1992 (aged 33)	6	(United States) Denver Onyx
Emily Henrich	Centre	10 November 1999 (aged 25)	25	(England) Leicester Tigers / (United States) Boston Banshees
Alev Kelter	Centre	21 March 1991 (aged 34)	31	(England) Loughborough Lightning / (United States) Bay Breakers
Ilona Maher	Centre	12 August 1996 (aged 29)	7	(England) Bristol Bears / (United States) USA Sevens
Erica Coulibaly	Wing	26 August 2001 (aged 23)	3	(United States) Denver Onyx
Cheta Emba	Wing	16 July 1993 (aged 32)	16	(United States) Boston Banshees
Sariah Ibarra	Wing	19 September 2005 (aged 19)	5	(United States) USA Sevens
Lotte Sharp	Wing	13 January 1995 (aged 30)	18	(England) Saracens
Tess Feury^{1}	Fullback	15 March 1996 (aged 29)	34	(England) Leicester Tigers
Bulou Mataitoga^{1}	Fullback	8 April 1994 (aged 31)	27	(England) Loughborough Lightning / (United States) Bay Breakers

== Pool B ==
=== Canada ===
Head coach: (France) Kévin Rouet

Canada named their 32-player squad on 24 July 2025.

^{1} On 15 August 2025, Pamphinette Buisa was ruled out of the World Cup, after sustaining an injury in a warm-up match against Ireland. She was replaced by Julia Omokhuale.

Player	Position	Date of birth (age)	Caps	Club/province
Gillian Boag	Hooker	19 February 1995 (aged 30)	32	(Canada) Capilano RFC
Taylor McKnight	Hooker	5 April 2003 (aged 22)	1	(Canada) University of Guelph / Aurora Barbarians
Emily Tuttosi	Hooker	21 September 1995 (aged 29)	34	(England) Exeter Chiefs / (Canada) Calgary Hornets
Olivia DeMerchant	Prop	16 February 1991 (aged 34)	60	(Canada) Halifax Tars RFC
McKinley Hunt	Prop	5 January 1997 (aged 28)	32	(England) Saracens / (Canada) Aurora Barbarians
Brittany Kassil	Prop	14 March 1991 (aged 34)	46	(Canada) Guelph Goats
DaLeaka Menin	Prop	16 June 1995 (aged 30)	63	(England) Exeter Chiefs / (Canada) Calgary Hornets
Maya Montiel	Prop	11 October 1999 (aged 25)	5	(England) Saracens
Mikiela Nelson	Prop	27 November 1997 (aged 27)	10	(England) Exeter Chiefs / (Canada) Capilano RFC
Tyson Beukeboom	Second row	10 March 1991 (aged 34)	77	(Canada) Cowichan Piggies / Aurora Barbarians
Caroline Crossley	Second row	19 April 1998 (aged 27)	7	(Canada) Castaway Wanderers
Courtney O'Donnell	Second row	25 April 1999 (aged 26)	46	(Canada) Red Deer Titans
Julia Omokhuale^{1}	Second row	9 July 2001 (aged 24)	7	(England) Saracens / (Canada) Calgary Irish
Rachel Smith	Second row	7 April 2001 (aged 24)	3	(Canada) University of British Columbia
Pamphinette Buisa^{1}	Back row	28 December 1996 (aged 28)	17	(Canada) Ottawa Irish
Sophie de Goede	Back row	30 June 1999 (aged 26)	35	(England) Saracens / (Canada) Castaway Wanderers
Fabiola Forteza	Back row	4 August 1995 (aged 30)	35	(France) Stade Bordelais
Karen Paquin	Back row	3 August 1987 (aged 38)	45	(Canada) Club de rugby de Quebec
Laetitia Royer	Back row	9 February 1991 (aged 34)	18	(England) Saracens / (Canada) Saint-Anne-de-Bellevue RFC
Gabby Senft	Back row	13 June 1997 (aged 28)	32	(England) Saracens / (Canada) Castaway Wanderers
Olivia Apps	Scrum-half	1 December 1998 (aged 26)	18	(Canada) Lindsay RFC
Justine Pelletier	Scrum-half	27 February 1996 (aged 29)	37	(France) Stade Bordelais
Claire Gallagher	Fly-half	20 April 2000 (aged 25)	18	(England) Trailfinders
Taylor Perry	Fly-half	23 July 2000 (aged 25)	15	(England) Exeter Chiefs / (Canada) Oakville Crusaders
Alex Tessier (c)	Fly-half	3 September 1993 (aged 31)	59	(England) Exeter Chiefs / (Canada) Saint-Anne-de-Bellevue RFC
Alysha Corrigan	Centre	25 January 1997 (aged 28)	21	(England) Saracens
Shoshanah Seumanutafa	Centre	17 September 1999 (aged 25)	18	(New Zealand) Chiefs Manawa
Fancy Bermudez	Wing	27 May 2002 (aged 23)	18	(England) Saracens / (Canada) Westshore RFC
Paige Farries	Wing	12 August 1994 (aged 31)	40	(England) Saracens
Asia Hogan-Rochester	Wing	20 April 1999 (aged 26)	3	(Canada) Toronto Nomads / Westshore RFC
Florence Symonds	Wing	20 May 2002 (aged 23)	12	(Canada) University of British Columbia
Sarah-Maude Lachance	Fullback	7 December 1998 (aged 26)	10	(France) Stade Bordelais
Julia Schell	Fullback	13 July 1997 (aged 28)	26	(England) Trailfinders / (Canada) Castaway Wanderers

=== Fiji ===
Head coach: (Wales) Ioan Cunningham

Fiji announced their final playing squad on 9 August 2025.

Player	Position	Date of birth (age)	Caps	Club/province
Keleni Marawa	Hooker	1 January 1990 (aged 35)	21	(Fiji) Fijiana Drua
Selai Naliva	Hooker	2 July 2005 (aged 20)	1	
Vika Matarugu	Prop	2 August 1994 (aged 31)	19	(Fiji) Fijiana Drua
Tiana Robanakadavu	Prop	17 July 2005 (aged 20)	18	(Fiji) Fijiana Drua
Loraini Senivutu	Prop	23 January 2003 (aged 22)	13	(Fiji) Fijiana Drua
Bitila Tawake	Prop	2 April 1999 (aged 26)	23	(Fiji) Fijiana Drua
Bulou Vasuturaga	Prop	1 November 1991 (aged 33)	9	
Jade Coates	Second row	9 July 1998 (aged 27)	9	(New Zealand) Chiefs Manawa
Mereoni Nakesa	Second row	17 February 2003 (aged 22)	23	(Fiji) Fijiana Drua
Asinate Serevi	Second row	16 April 1995 (aged 30)	27	(Fiji) Fijiana Drua
Nunia Daunimoala	Back row	30 June 1999 (aged 26)	17	(Fiji) Fijiana Drua
Alfreda Fisher (c)	Back row	9 May 2004 (aged 21)	8	(Fiji) Fijiana Drua
Karalaini Naisewa	Back row	23 July 1994 (aged 31)	28	(Fiji) Fijiana Drua
Adi Salaseini Railumu	Back row	20 November 2002 (aged 22)	4	(Fiji) Fijiana Drua
Sulita Waisega	Back row	16 March 2004 (aged 21)	24	
Carletta Yee	Back row	21 June 2007 (aged 18)	1	(Fiji) Fijiana Drua
Kolora Lomani	Scrum-half	22 July 1999 (aged 26)	17	(Fiji) Fijiana Drua
Salanieta Kinita	Fly-half	14 September 2001 (aged 23)	15	(Fiji) Fijiana Drua
Setaita Railumu	Fly-half	18 April 2001 (aged 24)	20	(Fiji) Fijiana Drua
Verenaisi Ditavutu	Centre	7 September 1999 (aged 25)	1	(Fiji) Fijiana 7s
Rusila Nagasau	Centre	4 August 1987 (aged 38)	12	(Fiji) Fijiana Drua
Alowesi Nakoci	Centre	18 August 1991 (aged 34)	7	(Fiji) Fijiana Drua
Ilisapeci Delaiwau	Wing	1 June 2000 (aged 25)	5	(Fiji) Fijiana 7s
Mere Vocevoce	Wing	4 April 2006 (aged 19)	0	(Fiji) Fijiana 7s
Ema Adivitaloga	Fullback	27 July 1994 (aged 31)	20	(Fiji) Fijiana Drua
Repeka Tove	Fullback	17 October 1998 (aged 26)	12	(Fiji) Fijiana Drua
Manuqalo Komaitai	Back	5 July 1996 (aged 29)	2	
Kelerayani Luvu	Back	7 November 2005 (aged 19)	0	(Fiji) Fijiana 7s
Adi Salote Nailolo	Back	13 June 2006 (aged 19)	1	
Josifini Neihamu	Back	29 January 2004 (aged 21)	3	(Fiji) Fijiana Drua
Michella'e Stolz	Back	11 August 2006 (aged 19)	2	
Litiana Vueti	Back	20 June 1998 (aged 27)	2	(Fiji) Fijiana Drua

=== Scotland ===
Head coach: (Scotland) Bryan Easson

Scotland named their final 32-player squad on 7 August 2025.

^{1} On 8 September, Elliann Clarke was ruled out of the tournament, after sustaining an injury in the pool stage match against Fiji. She was replaced by Christine Belisle.

Player	Position	Date of birth (age)	Caps	Club/province
Elis Martin	Hooker	23 May 1999 (aged 26)	22	(England) Loughborough Lightning
Lana Skeldon	Hooker	18 October 1993 (aged 31)	81	(England) Bristol Bears
Molly Wright	Hooker	13 May 1991 (aged 34)	24	(England) Sale Sharks
Leah Bartlett	Prop	28 August 1998 (aged 26)	45	(England) Sale Sharks
Christine Belisle^{1}	Prop	4 November 1993 (aged 31)	41	(England) Loughborough Lightning
Elliann Clarke^{1}	Prop	16 February 2001 (aged 24)	22	(England) Bristol Bears
Lisa Cockburn	Prop	6 December 1992 (aged 32)	34	(England) Gloucester-Hartpury / (Scotland) Glasgow Warriors
Molly Poolman	Prop	10 May 2004 (aged 21)	5	(Scotland) Edinburgh
Anne Young	Prop	17 March 2000 (aged 25)	21	(England) Loughborough Lightning
Sarah Bonar	Second row	9 February 1994 (aged 31)	47	(England) Harlequins
Becky Boyd	Second row	17 May 2004 (aged 21)	3	(England) Loughborough Lightning
Eva Donaldson	Second row	10 July 2001 (aged 24)	17	(England) Sale Sharks
Adelle Ferrie	Second row	14 October 1997 (aged 27)	6	(Scotland) Edinburgh
Emma Wassell	Second row	28 December 1994 (aged 30)	69	(England) Trailfinders
Evie Gallagher	Back row	22 August 2000 (aged 25)	37	(England) Bristol Bears
Jade Konkel	Back row	9 December 1993 (aged 31)	71	(England) Harlequins
Rachel Malcolm (c)	Back row	23 May 1991 (aged 34)	58	(England) Trailfinders
Rachel McLachlan	Back row	26 February 1999 (aged 26)	53	(France) Montpellier HR
Alex Stewart	Back row	28 May 2004 (aged 21)	13	(Scotland) Edinburgh
Leia Brebner-Holden	Scrum-half	26 May 2002 (aged 23)	11	(England) Loughborough Lightning
Rhea Clarke	Scrum-half	31 August 2003 (aged 21)	1	(England) Bristol Bears
Caity Mattinson	Scrum-half	17 May 1996 (aged 29)	33	(England) Trailfinders
Helen Nelson	Fly-half	24 May 1994 (aged 31)	71	(England) Loughborough Lightning
Hannah Ramsay	Fly-half	4 September 2003 (aged 21)	2	(Scotland) Edinburgh
Beth Blacklock	Centre	13 November 1997 (aged 27)	4	(England) Saracens
Emma Orr	Centre	6 April 2003 (aged 22)	30	(England) Bristol Bears
Lisa Thomson	Centre	7 September 1997 (aged 27)	71	(England) Trailfinders
Evie Wills	Centre	4 February 2001 (aged 24)	6	(England) Sale Sharks
Coreen Grant	Wing	30 January 1998 (aged 27)	17	(England) Harlequins
Rhona Lloyd	Wing	17 October 1996 (aged 28)	59	(England) Sale Sharks
Francesca McGhie	Wing	7 May 2003 (aged 22)	22	(England) Trailfinders
Chloe Rollie	Fullback	26 June 1995 (aged 30)	77	(France) Toulon Provence Méditerranée
Hannah Walker	Fullback	2 September 2004 (aged 20)	0	(Scotland) Edinburgh

=== Wales ===
Head coach: (Wales) Sean Lynn

Wales named their final 32 player squad on 11 August 2025.

^{1} On 2 September, Jenni Scoble was ruled out of the tournament, after sustaining an injury in the pool stage match against Canada. She was replaced by Abbey Constable.

Player	Position	Date of birth (age)	Caps	Club/province
Kelsey Jones	Hooker	4 September 1997 (aged 27)	50	(England) Gloucester–Hartpury
Carys Phillips	Hooker	12 November 1992 (aged 32)	84	(England) Harlequins
Molly Reardon	Hooker	22 September 2003 (aged 21)	9	(Wales) Gwalia Lightning
Katherine Baverstock	Prop	17 September 2002 (aged 22)	1	(England) Leicester Tigers
Abbey Constable^{1}	Prop	18 June 1991 (aged 34)	9	(England) Leicester Tigers / (Wales) Gwalia Lightning
Maisie Davies	Prop	17 August 2005 (aged 20)	8	(England) Bristol Bears
Gwenllian Pyrs	Prop	28 November 1997 (aged 27)	47	(England) Sale Sharks
Donna Rose	Prop	5 June 1991 (aged 34)	35	(England) Saracens
Jenni Scoble^{1}	Prop	28 March 1993 (aged 32)	6	(Wales) Gwalia Lightning
Sisilia Tuipulotu	Prop	14 August 2003 (aged 22)	26	(England) Gloucester–Hartpury
Gwen Crabb	Second row	28 June 1999 (aged 26)	34	(England) Gloucester–Hartpury / (Wales) Brython Thunder
Abbie Fleming	Second row	31 March 1996 (aged 29)	28	(England) Harlequins
Alaw Pyrs	Second row	12 October 2005 (aged 19)	8	(England) Gloucester–Hartpury
Tilly Vucaj	Second row	3 November 2005 (aged 19)	1	(Wales) Gwalia Lightning
Kate Williams (cc)	Flanker	5 April 2000 (aged 25)	21	(England) Gloucester–Hartpury
Alex Callender (cc)	Back row	29 July 2000 (aged 25)	44	(England) Harlequins
Georgia Evans	Back row	29 January 1997 (aged 28)	39	(England) Saracens
Bryonie King	Back row	14 August 2003 (aged 22)	10	(Wales) Gwalia Lightning
Bethan Lewis	Back row	19 February 1999 (aged 26)	57	(England) Gloucester–Hartpury
Branwen Metcalfe	Back row	27 September 2006 (aged 18)	0	(England) Hartpury University
Keira Bevan	Scrum-half	28 April 1997 (aged 28)	74	(England) Bristol Bears
Megan Davies	Scrum-half	19 January 2002 (aged 23)	8	(England) Gloucester–Hartpury / (Wales) Gwalia Lightning
Seren Lockwood	Scrum-half	28 October 2006 (aged 18)	1	(England) Gloucester–Hartpury / (Wales) Gwalia Lightning
Lleucu George	Fly-half	12 January 2000 (aged 25)	32	(England) Gloucester–Hartpury
Kayleigh Powell	Fly-half	18 February 1999 (aged 26)	24	(England) Harlequins
Carys Cox	Centre	5 November 1998 (aged 26)	19	(England) Trailfinders
Hannah Dallavalle	Centre	14 November 1996 (aged 28)	66	(England) Gloucester–Hartpury
Courtney Keight	Centre	27 December 1997 (aged 27)	23	(England) Sale Sharks
Kerin Lake	Centre	24 May 1990 (aged 35)	53	(Wales) Gwalia Lightning
Jasmine Joyce-Butchers	Wing	9 October 1995 (aged 29)	49	(England) Bristol Bears
Lisa Neumann	Wing	23 December 1993 (aged 31)	48	(England) Harlequins
Catherine Richards	Wing	21 October 2000 (aged 24)	4	(England) Gloucester–Hartpury / (Wales) Gwalia Lightning
Nel Metcalfe	Fullback	17 December 2004 (aged 20)	11	(England) Gloucester–Hartpury

== Pool C ==
=== Ireland ===
Head coach: (England) Scott Bemand

Ireland named their final 32 player squad on 11 August 2025.

Player	Position	Date of birth (age)	Caps	Club/province
Beth Buttimer	Hooker	18 August 2005 (aged 20)	0	(Ireland) UL Bohemian / Munster
Neve Jones	Hooker	26 December 1998 (aged 26)	37	(England) Gloucester–Hartpury
Cliodhna Moloney-MacDonald	Hooker	31 May 1993 (aged 32)	45	(England) Exeter Chiefs
Linda Djougang	Prop	17 May 1996 (aged 29)	48	(Ireland) Old Belvedere / Leinster
Sadhbh McGrath	Prop	30 August 2004 (aged 20)	16	(Ireland) Cooke RFC / Ulster
Niamh O'Dowd	Prop	21 April 2000 (aged 25)	17	(Ireland) Old Belvedere / Leinster
Ellena Perry	Prop	4 December 1997 (aged 27)	1	(England) Gloucester–Hartpury
Claire Boles	Second row	28 May 1998 (aged 27)	6	(Ireland) Railway Union / Ulster
Ruth Campbell	Second row	27 June 2003 (aged 22)	8	(Ireland) Old Belvedere / Leinster
Eimear Corri Fallon	Second row	9 April 1998 (aged 27)	6	(Ireland) Blackrock RFC / Leinster
Siobhán McCarthy	Second row	5 September 1998 (aged 26)	9	(Ireland) Railway Union / Munster
Sam Monaghan (cc)	Second row	25 June 1993 (aged 32)	23	(England) Gloucester–Hartpury
Fiona Tuite	Second row	27 December 1996 (aged 28)	17	(Ireland) Old Belvedere / Ulster
Brittany Hogan	Back row	19 September 1998 (aged 26)	34	(Ireland) Old Belvedere / Ulster
Ivana Kiripati	Back row	6 August 2003 (aged 22)	2	(Ireland) Creggs RFC / Connacht
Edel McMahon (cc)	Back row	25 March 1994 (aged 31)	34	(England) Exeter Chiefs / (Ireland) Connacht
Grace Moore	Back row	21 May 1996 (aged 29)	22	(England) Trailfinders
Aoife Wafer	Back row	25 March 2003 (aged 22)	15	(Ireland) Blackrock College RFC / Leinster
Emily Lane	Scrum-half	10 January 1999 (aged 26)	17	(Ireland) Blackrock College RFC / Munster
Aoibheann Reilly	Scrum-half	1 November 2000 (aged 24)	16	(Ireland) Blackrock College RFC / Connacht
Molly Scuffil-McCabe	Scrum-half	15 March 1998 (aged 27)	22	(New Zealand) Manawatū / (Ireland) Leinster
Stacey Flood	Fly-half	5 August 1996 (aged 29)	20	(Ireland) Railway Union / Leinster
Nicole Fowley	Fly-half	23 December 1992 (aged 32)	14	(Ireland) Galwegians RFC / Connacht
Dannah O'Brien	Fly-half	22 September 2003 (aged 21)	26	(Ireland) Old Belvedere RFC / Leinster
Enya Breen	Centre	23 April 1999 (aged 26)	31	(Ireland) Blackrock College RFC / Munster
Aoife Dalton	Centre	3 May 2003 (aged 22)	24	(Ireland) Old Belvedere RFC / Leinster
Eve Higgins	Centre	23 June 1999 (aged 26)	28	(Ireland) Railway Union / Leinster
Nancy McGillivray	Centre	15 November 2002 (aged 22)	1	(England) Exeter Chiefs
Amee-Leigh Costigan	Wing	26 April 1995 (aged 30)	10	(Ireland) Railway Union / Munster
Anna McGann	Wing	4 June 1998 (aged 27)	11	(Ireland) Railway Union / Connacht
Béibhinn Parsons	Wing	30 November 2001 (aged 23)	28	(Ireland) Blackrock College RFC / Connacht
Méabh Deely	Fullback	25 October 2000 (aged 24)	14	(Ireland) Blackrock College RFC / Connacht

=== Japan ===
Head coach: (Canada) Lesley McKenzie

Japan named their final squad on 28 July 2025.

Player	Position	Date of birth (age)	Caps	Club/province
Ayumu Kokaji	Hooker	19 February 2000 (aged 25)	11	(Japan) Tokyo Sankyu Phoenix
Asuka Kuge	Hooker	22 September 1994 (aged 30)	22	(Japan) Arukas Queen Kumagaya
Kotomi Taniguchi	Hooker	10 April 1995 (aged 30)	26	(Japan) Yokogawa Musashino Artemi-Stars
Sachiko Kato	Prop	19 February 2000 (aged 25)	30	(Japan) Yokogawa Musashino Artemi-Stars
Wako Kitano	Prop	8 September 1999 (aged 25)	22	(Japan) Mie Pearls
Hinata Komaki	Prop	9 May 2001 (aged 24)	21	(Japan) Tokyo Sankyu Phoenix
Miharu Machida	Prop	26 May 2004 (aged 21)	4	Japan University of Economics
Manami Mine	Prop	11 September 2003 (aged 21)	12	(Japan) Nippon Sport Science University
Nijiho Nagata	Prop	6 December 2000 (aged 24)	29	(Japan) Mie Pearls
Ayano Sakurai	Second row	15 April 1996 (aged 29)	23	(Japan) Yokogawa Musashino Artemi-Stars
Yuna Sato	Second row	11 September 1998 (aged 26)	24	(Japan) Tokyo Sankyu Phoenix
Otoka Yoshimura	Second row	15 May 2001 (aged 24)	29	(Japan) Arukas Queen Kumagaya
Kyoko Hosokawa	Back row	8 July 1999 (aged 26)	17	(Japan) Mie Pearls
Masami Kawamura	Back row	13 July 1999 (aged 26)	22	(Japan) Yokogawa Musashino Artemi-Stars
Sakurako Korai	Back row	9 April 2003 (aged 22)	22	(Japan) Nippon Sport Science University
Iroha Nagata	Back row	21 December 1998 (aged 26)	40	(Japan) Arukas Queen Kumagaya
Jennifer Nduka	Back row	18 October 2000 (aged 24)	15	(Japan) Hokkaido Barbarians Diana
Seina Saito	Back row	30 May 1992 (aged 33)	50	(Japan) Mie Pearls
Megumi Abe	Scrum-half	28 April 1998 (aged 27)	32	(Japan) Arukas Queen Kumagaya
Moe Tsukui	Scrum-half	28 March 2000 (aged 25)	42	(Japan) Yokogawa Musashino Artemi-Stars
Ayasa Otsuka	Fly-half	5 May 1999 (aged 26)	36	(Japan) Arukas Queen Kumagaya
Minori Yamamoto	Fly-half	9 December 1996 (aged 28)	38	(Japan) Yokohama TKM
Nao Ando	Centre	17 July 2001 (aged 24)	12	(Japan) Brave Louve
Mana Furuta	Centre	16 November 1997 (aged 27)	36	(Japan) Tokyo Sankyu Phoenix
Sakurako Hatada	Centre	8 May 2003 (aged 22)	9	(Japan) Nippon Sport Science University
Haruka Hirotsu	Centre	29 October 2000 (aged 24)	17	(Japan) Nanairo Prism Fukuoka
Kanako Kobayashi	Centre	13 November 1998 (aged 26)	20	(Japan) Yokogawa Musashino Artemi-Stars
Komachi Imakugi	Wing	6 January 2002 (aged 23)	30	(Japan) Arukas Queen Kumagaya
Mele Yua Havili Kagawa	Wing	29 September 2001 (aged 23)	5	(Japan) Nanairo Prism Fukuoka
Misaki Matsumura	Wing	6 March 2005 (aged 20)	13	(Japan) Tokyo Sankyu Phoenix
Rinka Matsuda	Fullback	5 December 2001 (aged 23)	14	(Japan) Tokyo Sankyu Phoenix
Sora Nishimura	Fullback	29 September 2000 (aged 24)	21	(Japan) Mie Pearls

=== New Zealand ===
Head coach: (New Zealand) Allan Bunting

New Zealand named their final 32-player squad on 25 July 2025.

^{1} On 12 September, Amy du Plessis was ruled out of the tournament, after sustaining an injury in the pool stage match against Spain. Was replaced by Mererangi Paul.

Player	Position	Date of birth (age)	Caps	Club/province
Vici-Rose Green	Hooker	4 August 2002 (aged 23)	2	(New Zealand) Chiefs Manawa / Waikato
Atlanta Lolohea	Hooker	16 April 2003 (aged 22)	7	(New Zealand) Blues / Canterbury
Georgia Ponsonby	Hooker	14 December 1999 (aged 25)	31	(New Zealand) Matatū / Canterbury
Kate Henwood	Prop	28 January 1989 (aged 36)	10	(New Zealand) Chiefs Manawa / Bay of Plenty
Tanya Kalounivale	Prop	20 January 1999 (aged 26)	22	(New Zealand) Chiefs Manawa / Waikato
Veisinia Mahutariki-Fakalelu	Prop	24 November 2004 (aged 20)	1	(New Zealand) Chiefs Manawa / Waikato
Amy Rule	Prop	15 July 2000 (aged 25)	30	(New Zealand) Matatū / Canterbury
Awhina Tangen-Wainohu	Prop	16 December 1997 (aged 27)	7	(New Zealand) Blues / Waikato
Chryss Viliko	Prop	25 December 2000 (aged 24)	13	(New Zealand) Blues / Auckland
Laura Bayfield	Second row	5 March 1999 (aged 26)	1	(New Zealand) Matatū / Canterbury
Alana Bremner	Second row	10 February 1997 (aged 28)	29	(New Zealand) Matatū / Canterbury
Chelsea Bremner	Second row	11 April 1995 (aged 30)	22	(New Zealand) Matatū / Canterbury
Maia Roos	Second row	27 July 2001 (aged 24)	33	(New Zealand) Blues / Auckland
Liana Mikaele-Tu'u	Back row	2 March 2002 (aged 23)	29	(New Zealand) Blues / Auckland
Jorja Miller	Back row	8 February 2004 (aged 21)	2	New Zealand 7s / Canterbury
Kaipo Olsen-Baker	Back row	1 May 2002 (aged 23)	12	(New Zealand) Matatū / Manawatū
Layla Sae	Back row	22 October 2000 (aged 24)	14	(New Zealand) Hurricanes Poua / Manawatū
Kennedy Tukuafu	Back row	1 October 1996 (aged 28)	30	(New Zealand) Chiefs Manawa / Waikato
Iritana Hohaia	Scrum-half	1 March 2000 (aged 25)	17	(New Zealand) Hurricanes Poua / Taranaki
Maia Joseph	Scrum-half	20 May 2002 (aged 23)	11	(New Zealand) Matatū / Otago
Risi Pouri-Lane	Scrum-half	28 May 2000 (aged 25)	2	New Zealand 7s / Tasman
Kelly Brazier	Fly-half	28 October 1989 (aged 35)	43	(New Zealand) Chiefs Manawa / Bay of Plenty
Ruahei Demant	Fly-half	21 April 1995 (aged 30)	45	(New Zealand) Blues / Auckland
Sylvia Brunt	Centre	1 January 2004 (aged 21)	25	(New Zealand) Blues / Auckland
Amy du Plessis^{1}	Centre	7 July 1999 (aged 26)	21	(New Zealand) Matatū / Canterbury
Theresa Setefano	Centre	25 February 1995 (aged 30)	19	(New Zealand) Blues / Auckland
Stacey Waaka	Centre	3 November 1995 (aged 29)	27	(New Zealand) Chiefs Manawa / Waikato
Ayesha Leti-I'iga	Wing	3 January 1999 (aged 26)	26	(New Zealand) Hurricanes Poua / Wellington
Mererangi Paul^{1}	Wing	29 October 1998 (aged 26)	14	(New Zealand) Chiefs Manawa / Counties Manukau
Katelyn Vaha'akolo	Wing	18 April 2000 (aged 25)	17	(New Zealand) Blues / Auckland
Portia Woodman-Wickliffe	Wing	12 July 1991 (aged 34)	28	(New Zealand) Blues / Northland
Renee Holmes	Fullback	21 December 1999 (aged 25)	24	(New Zealand) Chiefs Manawa / Waikato
Braxton Sorensen-McGee	Fullback	26 October 2006 (aged 18)	3	(New Zealand) Blues / Auckland

=== Spain ===
Head coach: (Spain) Juan González Marruecos

Spain named their final 32-player squad on 11 August 2025.

Player	Position	Date of birth (age)	Caps	Club/province
Cristina Blanco	Hooker	30 September 1995 (aged 29)	31	(England) Trailfinders
Nuria Jou	Hooker	10 November 2001 (aged 23)	11	(Spain) UE Santboiana
Marieta Román	Hooker	12 February 1999 (aged 26)	23	(Spain) Cocodrilas
Inés Antolínez	Prop	16 January 1997 (aged 28)	21	(Spain) El Salvador
Sidorella Bracic	Prop	12 June 1993 (aged 32)	27	(Spain) El Salvador
Mireia de Andrés	Prop	10 September 1999 (aged 25)	9	(Spain) Sant Cugat
Laura Delgado (cc)	Prop	7 April 1990 (aged 35)	51	(England) Harlequins
Eider García	Prop	3 February 2005 (aged 20)	5	(France) Lyon OU
Gemma Silva	Prop	9 May 2005 (aged 20)	6	(Spain) AVR FC Barcelona
Lourdes Alameda	Second row	29 July 1991 (aged 34)	42	(France) AC Bobigny 93
Mónica Castelo	Second row	18 April 1987 (aged 38)	28	(France) Stade Rennais
Elena Martínez	Second row	9 September 1995 (aged 29)	9	(France) Stade Rennais
Ana Peralta	Second row	25 June 2003 (aged 22)	8	(Spain) CRAT
Anna Puig	Second row	14 October 1999 (aged 25)	36	(Spain) UE Santboiana
Victoria Rosell	Second row	30 September 2005 (aged 19)	7	(Spain) Complutense Cisneros
Nerea García	Flanker	17 November 1996 (aged 28)	8	(Spain) El Salvador
Alba Capell	Back row	28 October 2003 (aged 21)	29	(England) Sale Sharks
Valentina Pérez	Back row	27 December 2004 (aged 20)	7	(Spain) Turia
Lia Piñeiro	Back row	18 August 2001 (aged 24)	10	(Spain) Olímpico de Pozuelo
Maider Aresti	Scrum-half	24 July 2003 (aged 22)	13	(Spain) Getxo
Anne Fernández de Corres	Scrum-half	30 May 1998 (aged 27)	35	(Spain) Eibar RT
Bingbing Vergara	Scrum-half	19 April 2005 (aged 20)	9	(Spain) El Salvador
Amàlia Argudo	Fly-half	24 January 2000 (aged 25)	25	(France) Stade Toulousain
Lea Ducher	Centre	29 April 2002 (aged 23)	5	(Spain) Cocodrilas
Clàudia Peña	Centre	26 October 2004 (aged 20)	26	(England) Harlequins
Claudia Pérez	Centre	29 June 2004 (aged 21)	17	(Spain) Majadahonda
Zahía Pérez	Centre	14 January 2004 (aged 21)	30	(Spain) Complutense Cisneros
Alba Vinuesa (cc)	Centre	30 March 1999 (aged 26)	35	(France) Stade Français
Claudia Cano	Wing	2 August 2005 (aged 20)	14	(Spain) Complutense Cisneros
Ana Cortés	Wing	7 November 2006 (aged 18)	6	(Spain) CRC Pozuelo
Tecla Masoko	Wing	20 May 2000 (aged 25)	8	(Spain) El Salvador
Clara Piquero	Wing	11 February 1999 (aged 26)	28	(France) Section Paloise

== Pool D ==
=== Brazil ===
Head coach: (Uruguay) Emiliano Caffera

Brazil named their final 32-player squad on 28 July 2025.

Player	Position	Date of birth (age)	Caps	Club/province
Isabela Gomes Saccomanno	Hooker	16 October 1997 (aged 27)	9	(Brazil) São José
Júlia Leni Lima	Hooker	12 June 2004 (aged 21)	12	(Brazil) Curitiba
Natália Jonck	Hooker	13 December 1996 (aged 28)	2	(Australia) Brothers Rugby Club
Franciele Barros	Prop	8 May 1995 (aged 30)	11	(Portugal) Sporting
Giovana Mamede	Prop	21 April 2004 (aged 21)	2	(Brazil) Jacareí
Pâmela Santos	Prop	10 September 1992 (aged 32)	4	(Brazil) Charrua
Samara Vergara	Prop	20 February 1993 (aged 32)	8	(Brazil) Pasteur
Taís Prioste	Prop	9 April 1999 (aged 26)	10	(France) Bobigny
Ana Carolina Santana	Second row	8 July 1988 (aged 37)	4	(Brazil) Melina
Dayana Dakar	Second row	18 July 1997 (aged 28)	9	(Brazil) Niterói
Eshyllen Coimbra (c)	Second row	18 August 2000 (aged 25)	14	(Brazil) Elshaddai
Camilla Ísis Carvalho	Back row	30 June 2002 (aged 23)	3	(Brazil) Elshaddai
Íris Coluna	Back row	21 July 1990 (aged 35)	8	(Brazil) Poli
Larissa Carvalho	Back row	31 May 2003 (aged 22)	8	(Brazil) Curitiba
Larissa Henwood	Back row	24 January 1994 (aged 31)	6	(New Zealand) Counties Manukau
Letícia Medeiros	Back row	19 December 1994 (aged 30)	9	(Brazil) Jacareí
Letícia Silva	Back row	29 December 2005 (aged 19)	5	(Brazil) Melina
Marcelle Souza	Back row	22 July 1996 (aged 29)	4	(Brazil) Elshaddai
Aline Bednarski	Scrum-half	24 April 1996 (aged 29)	11	(Brazil) Pasteur
Luiza Campos	Scrum-half	30 July 1990 (aged 35)	10	(Brazil) Charrua
Leila Silva	Scrum-half	23 October 1996 (aged 28)	3	(Brazil) Leoas de Paraisópolis
Fernanda Tenório	Fly-half	11 April 2002 (aged 23)	8	(Brazil) Elshaddai
Maria Gabriela Graf	Fly-half	2 December 1995 (aged 29)	4	(Australia) Brothers Rugby Club
Raquel Kochhann	Fly-half	6 October 1992 (aged 32)	6	(Brazil) Charrua
Carolyne Katrine Pereira	Centre	8 July 2003 (aged 22)	3	(Brazil) Melina
Edna Santini	Centre	15 July 1992 (aged 33)	9	(Brazil) São José
Mariana Nicolau	Centre	16 November 1997 (aged 27)	3	(Brazil) São José
Marina Fioravanti	Centre	6 October 1993 (aged 31)	5	(Brazil) Poli
Giovanna Barth	Wing	15 March 2004 (aged 21)	4	(Brazil) Maringá
Bianca Silva	Wing	22 July 1998 (aged 27)	3	(Brazil) Leoas de Paraisópolis
Isadora Lopes	Wing	3 August 1997 (aged 28)	7	(Brazil) Melina
Yasmim Soares	Fullback	5 May 1999 (aged 26)	3	(Brazil) Melina

=== France ===
Head coach: (France) Gaëlle Mignot & David Ortiz

France announced their 32 player squad on 2 August 2025.

Player	Position	Date of birth (age)	Caps	Club/province
Manon Bigot	Hooker	6 June 1990 (aged 35)	14	(France) Blagnac SC
Agathe Gérin	Hooker	21 May 1995 (aged 30)	57	(France) Stade Bordelais
Élisa Riffonneau	Hooker	26 November 2003 (aged 21)	17	(France) FC Grenoble Amazones
Makarita Baleinadogo	Prop	9 February 2002 (aged 23)	0	(France) Stade Bordelais
Rose Bernadou	Prop	27 March 2000 (aged 25)	21	(France) Montpellier HR
Yllana Brosseau	Prop	5 September 2000 (aged 24)	22	(France) Stade Bordelais
Annaëlle Deshayes	Prop	16 March 1996 (aged 29)	49	(France) Stade Bordelais
Assia Khalfaoui	Prop	24 March 2001 (aged 24)	31	(France) Stade Bordelais
Madoussou Fall	Second row	17 March 1998 (aged 27)	40	(France) Stade Bordelais
Manaé Feleu	Second row	3 February 2000 (aged 25)	27	(France) FC Grenoble Amazones
Hina Ikahehegi	Second row	29 April 2003 (aged 22)	4	(France) Stade Villeneuvois LM
Axelle Berthoumieu	Back row	9 July 2000 (aged 25)	22	(France) Blagnac SC
Léa Champon	Back row	25 February 2003 (aged 22)	9	(France) FC Grenoble Amazones
Khoudedia Cissokho	Back row	22 June 1999 (aged 26)	1	(France) Stade Bordelais
Charlotte Escudero	Back row	26 December 2000 (aged 24)	27	(France) Stade Toulousain
Teani Feleu	Back row	19 December 2002 (aged 22)	12	(France) FC Grenoble Amazones
Taïna Maka	Back row	22 December 2004 (aged 20)	2	(France) FC Grenoble Amazones
Marie Morland	Back row	5 October 2005 (aged 19)	0	(France) Lyon OU
Séraphine Okemba	Back row	3 December 1995 (aged 29)	8	(France) Lyon OU
Pauline Bourdon Sansus	Scrum-half	4 November 1995 (aged 29)	66	(France) Stade Toulousain
Alexandra Chambon	Scrum-half	2 August 2000 (aged 25)	30	(France) FC Grenoble Amazones
Carla Neisen	Scrum-half	8 March 1996 (aged 29)	27	(France) Blagnac SC
Carla Arbez	Fly-half	24 May 1999 (aged 26)	13	(France) Stade Bordelais
Lina Queyroi	Fly-half	18 May 2001 (aged 24)	23	(France) Stade Toulousain
Lina Tuy	Fly-half	10 September 2004 (aged 20)	8	(France) ASM Romagnat
Nassira Konde	Centre	30 July 1999 (aged 26)	15	(France) Stade Bordelais
Gaby Vernier	Centre	2 June 1997 (aged 28)	52	(France) Blagnac SC
Kelly Arbey	Wing	9 May 2005 (aged 20)	6	(France) Stade Toulousain
Joanna Grisez	Wing	5 October 1996 (aged 28)	9	(France) Stade Bordelais
Marine Ménager	Wing	26 July 1996 (aged 29)	58	(France) Montpellier HR
Émilie Boulard	Fullback	23 August 1999 (aged 25)	36	(France) Blagnac SC
Morgane Bourgeois	Fullback	6 February 2003 (aged 22)	14	(France) Stade Bordelais

=== Italy ===
Head coach: (Italy) Fabio Roselli

Italy named their final 32-player squad on 11 August 2025.

Player	Position	Date of birth (age)	Caps	Club/province
Desiree Spinelli	Hooker	28 April 2005 (aged 20)	4	(Italy) Benetton
Vittoria Vecchini	Hooker	13 January 2002 (aged 23)	38	(Italy) Valsugana Rugby Padova
Gaia Maris	Prop	5 December 2001 (aged 23)	39	(Italy) Valsugana Rugby Padova
Alessia Pilani	Prop	6 March 1999 (aged 26)	8	(France) Stade Bordelais
Sara Seye	Prop	26 August 2000 (aged 24)	34	(England) Trailfinders
Emanuela Stecca	Prop	24 February 1997 (aged 28)	18	(Italy) Villorba Rugby
Silvia Turani	Prop	6 July 1995 (aged 30)	44	(England) Harlequins
Giordana Duca	Second row	18 September 1992 (aged 32)	58	(Italy) Valsugana Rugby Padova
Valeria Fedrighi	Second row	5 September 1992 (aged 32)	64	(Italy) Rugby Colorno
Alessandra Frangipani	Second row	12 July 2003 (aged 22)	12	(Italy) Villorba Rugby
Isabella Locatelli	Second row	23 October 1994 (aged 30)	55	(Italy) Rugby Colorno
Sara Tounesi	Second row	19 July 1995 (aged 30)	50	(France) Stade Bordelais
Ilaria Arrighetti	Back row	2 March 1993 (aged 32)	62	(France) Stade Rennais
Elisa Giordano (c)	Back row	1 November 1990 (aged 34)	75	(Italy) Valsugana Rugby Padova
Laura Gurioli	Back row	2 February 1995 (aged 30)	16	(Italy) Villorba Rugby
Alissa Ranuccini	Back row	28 June 2000 (aged 25)	15	(France) Lyon OU
Francesca Sgorbini	Back row	7 January 2001 (aged 24)	34	(France) ASM Romagnat
Beatrice Veronese	Back row	11 March 1996 (aged 29)	29	(France) Toulon Provence Méditerranée
Alia Bitonci	Scrum-half	27 March 2006 (aged 19)	7	(Italy) Valsugana Rugby Padova
Sofia Stefan	Scrum-half	12 May 1992 (aged 33)	98	(France) Toulon Provence Méditerranée
Beatrice Capomaggi	Fly-half	29 April 1997 (aged 28)	23	(Italy) Villorba Rugby
Veronica Madia	Fly-half	16 January 1995 (aged 30)	58	(France) Blagnac SC
Sara Mannini	Fly-half	28 August 2005 (aged 19)	9	(Italy) Rugby Colorno
Emma Stevanin	Fly-half	11 April 2002 (aged 23)	24	(Italy) Valsugana Rugby Padova
Gaia Buso	Centre	19 August 2002 (aged 23)	3	(Italy) Villorba Rugby
Giada Corradini	Centre	17 April 2002 (aged 23)	1	(France) Montpellier HR
Beatrice Rigoni	Centre	1 August 1995 (aged 30)	86	(England) Sale Sharks
Michela Sillari	Centre	23 February 1993 (aged 32)	92	(Italy) Valsugana Rugby Padova
Alyssa D'Incà	Wing	23 March 2002 (aged 23)	33	(France) Blagnac SC
Francesca Granzotto	Wing	22 March 2002 (aged 23)	21	(England) Exeter Chiefs
Aura Muzzo	Wing	12 April 1997 (aged 28)	55	(France) Lyon OU
Vittoria Ostuni Minuzzi	Fullback	6 December 2001 (aged 23)	41	(Italy) Valsugana Rugby Padova

=== South Africa ===
Head coach: (South Africa) Swys de Bruin

South Africa named their final 32-player squad on 9 August 2025.

Player	Position	Date of birth (age)	Caps	Club/province
Micke Günter	Hooker	25 October 1998 (aged 26)	13	(England) Leicester Tigers
Lindelwa Gwala	Hooker	24 August 1997 (aged 27)	35	Unattached
Luchell Hanekom	Hooker	17 January 2001 (aged 24)	9	(South Africa) Western Province
Sanelisiwe Charlie	Prop	1 May 2000 (aged 25)	26	(South Africa) Bulls Daisies
Xoliswa Khuzwayo	Prop	17 June 1999 (aged 26)	8	(South Africa) Golden Lions Women
Yonela Ngxingolo	Prop	3 March 1998 (aged 27)	35	(South Africa) Bulls Daisies
Babalwa Latsha (vc)	Prop	31 March 1994 (aged 31)	36	Unattached
Nombuyekezo Mdliki	Prop	19 March 2002 (aged 23)	5	(South Africa) Border Ladies
Nolusindiso Booi (c)	Second row	29 June 1985 (aged 40)	52	(South Africa) Western Province
Danelle Lochner	Second row	16 May 1997 (aged 28)	19	(England) Harlequins
Nomsa Mokwai	Second row	30 August 1992 (aged 32)	13	(South Africa) Western Province
Anathi Qolo	Second row	21 February 1998 (aged 27)	9	(South Africa) Bulls Daisies
Vainah Ubisi	Second row	20 February 2003 (aged 22)	18	(South Africa) Bulls Daisies
Aseza Hele	Back row	26 November 1994 (aged 30)	28	(South Africa) Boland Dames
Catha Jacobs	Back row	2 June 1998 (aged 27)	22	Unattached
Lerato Makua	Back row	7 December 1999 (aged 25)	15	(South Africa) Bulls Daisies
Sinazo Mcatshulwa	Back row	24 December 1996 (aged 28)	38	Unattached
Sizophila Solontsi	Back row	9 March 1992 (aged 33)	28	(South Africa) Bulls Daisies
Faith Tshauke	Back row	16 December 1995 (aged 29)	3	(South Africa) Bulls Daisies
Unam Tose	Scrum-half	3 May 2000 (aged 25)	27	(South Africa) Bulls Daisies
Tayla Kinsey	Scrum-half	5 September 1993 (aged 31)	40	(South Africa) Sharks Women
Libbie Janse van Rensburg	Fly-half	28 September 1994 (aged 30)	27	(South Africa) Bulls Daisies
Mary Zulu	Fly-half	6 December 2002 (aged 22)	15	(South Africa) Sharks Women
Zintle Mpupha	Centre	25 December 1993 (aged 31)	26	(South Africa) Bulls Daisies
Aphiwe Ngwevu	Centre	14 May 1998 (aged 27)	27	(South Africa) Border Ladies
Chumisa Qawe	Centre	15 November 1999 (aged 25)	22	(South Africa) Bulls Daisies
Eloise Webb	Centre	5 March 1996 (aged 29)	17	(South Africa) Bulls Daisies
Jakkie Cilliers	Wing	30 October 2000 (aged 24)	19	(South Africa) Bulls Daisies
Ayanda Malinga	Wing	23 June 1998 (aged 27)	13	(South Africa) Bulls Daisies
Maceala Samboya	Wing	30 July 1999 (aged 26)	4	(South Africa) Boland Dames
Byrhandré Dolf	Fullback	4 July 2003 (aged 22)	22	(South Africa) Bulls Daisies
Nadine Roos	Fullback	9 May 1996 (aged 29)	18	Unattached

== Statistics ==
All statistics relate to the squads named before the start of the tournament on 22 August 2025, and do not include players who joined a squad during the tournament.

- Five squads have all of their players attached to clubs based within their home country: Australia, England, France, Japan and New Zealand.

=== Player representation by club ===
The club sides with the most players represented across the 16 squads are as follows:

Players	Clubs
24	(England) Gloucester–Hartpury
21	(Fiji) Fijiana Drua
19	(England) Saracens
16	(England) Sale Sharks / (France) Stade Bordelais / (England) Trailfinders
15	(South Africa) Bulls Daisies / (England) Exeter Chiefs
14	(England) Harlequins
13	(England) Bristol Bears / (England) Loughborough Lightning / (Australia) NSW Waratahs

=== Squad caps ===
Nation	Caps	Most capped player	Least capped player
Australia	610	Ashley Marsters (41)	Manu'a Moleka / Caitlin Urwin (0)
Brazil	211	Eshyllen Coimbra (14)	Natália Jonck / Giovana Mamede (2)
Canada	893	Tyson Beukeboom (77)	Taylor McKnight (1)
England	1421	Emily Scarratt (118)	Abi Burton / Lilli Ives Campion / Jade Shekells (3)
Fiji	364	Karalaini Naisewa (28)	Kelerayani Luvu / Mere Vocevoce (0)
France	720	Pauline Bourdon Sansus (66)	Makarita Baleinadogo / Marie Morland (0)
Ireland	602	Linda Djougang (48)	Beth Buttimer (0)
Italy	1206	Sofia Stefan (98)	Giada Corradini (1)
Japan	744	Seina Saito (50)	Miharu Machida (4)
New Zealand	601	Ruahei Demant (45)	Laura Bayfield / Veisinia Mahutariki-Fakalelu (1)
Samoa	226	Sui Tauaua-Pauaraisa (24)	Madisen-Jade Iva / Faith Nonutunu / Demielle Onesemo-Tuilaepa / Keilamarita Pouri-Lane / JayJay Taylor (0)
Scotland	1032	Lana Skeldon (81)	Hannah Walker (0)
South Africa	689	Nolusindiso Booi (52)	Faith Tshauke (3)
Spain	619	Laura Delgado (51)	Lea Ducher / Eider García (5)
United States	675	Hope Rogers (56)	Hope Cooper (0)
Wales	920	Carys Phillips (84)	Branwen Metcalfe (0)

=== Squad ages ===
The age for each player listed below is their age on 22 August 2025, the day that the World Cup begins.

- The oldest player at the tournament is Nolusindiso Booi (South Africa), at the age of 40.
- The youngest player at the tournament is Waiaria Ellis (Australia), at the age of 17.
- The age gap between the oldest and youngest players is 22 years and 74 days.

Nation	Oldest player	Youngest player
Australia	Emily Chancellor (34 years, 2 days)	Waiaria Ellis (17 years, 345 days)
Brazil	Ana Carolina Santana (37 years, 45 days)	Letícia Silva (19 years, 236 days)
Canada	Karen Paquin (38 years, 19 days)	Taylor McKnight (22 years, 139 days)
England	Natasha Hunt (36 years, 154 days)	Lilli Ives Campion (21 years, 316 days)
Fiji	Rusila Nagasau (38 years, 18 days)	Carletta Yee (18 years, 62 days)
France	Manon Bigot (35 years, 77 days)	Marie Morland (19 years, 321 days)
Ireland	Nicole Fowley (32 years, 242 days)	Beth Buttimer (20 years, 4 days)
Italy	Elisa Giordano (34 years, 294 days)	Alia Bitonci (19 years, 148 days)
Japan	Seina Saito (33 years, 84 days)	Misaki Matsumura (20 years, 169 days)
New Zealand	Kate Henwood (36 years, 206 days)	Braxton Sorensen-McGee (18 years, 300 days)
Samoa	Sui Tauaua-Pauaraisa (37 years, 296 days)	Faith Nonutunu (20 years, 36 days)
Scotland	Molly Wright (34 years, 101 days)	Hannah Walker (20 years, 354 days)
South Africa	Nolusindiso Booi (40 years, 54 days)	Byrhandré Dolf (22 years, 49 days)
Spain	Mónica Castelo (38 years, 126 days)	Ana Cortés (18 years, 288 days)
United States	Kate Zackary (36 years, 27 days)	Sariah Ibarra (19 years, 337 days)
Wales	Kerin Lake (35 years, 90 days)	Seren Lockwood (18 years, 298 days)
