= Lilli Ives Campion =

English rugby union player

- Born: 10 October 2003 (age 23)
- Height: 1.79 m (5 ft 10 in)
- University: Loughborough University

Rugby union career
- Position: Lock
- Current team: Loughborough Lightning
Senior career
Years	Team	Apps	(Points)
2021–	Loughborough Lightning	66	(25)
International career
Years	Team	Apps	(Points)
2021–2023	England U-20	8	(0)
2024–	England	5	(5)
Medal record
Representing England
Women's rugby union
Rugby World Cup
Gold medal – first place	2025 England	Team competition

Lilli Ives Campion (born 10 October 2003) is an English rugby union player who plays for Loughborough Lightning and the England women's national rugby union team.

== Early and personal life ==
Campion started playing rugby for Telford Hornets at the age of 13 years-old. She also trained in tap-dancing outside rugby, and is studied for a degree in international business at Loughborough University.

== Career ==
Campion joined Loughborough Lightning in 2021, for whom she plays at lock in the Premiership Women's Rugby. She signed a new contract with the club in January 2024. That summer, she captained the England Under-20s in the Six Nations Women's Summer Series. She was named in the team of the tournament.

She was called up to train with the senior England side in July 2024. She made her debut for the England women's national rugby union team against France in September 2024. She was subsequently named in the England squad for the 2024 WXV beginning that month in Canada.

In 2025, she was named in England's squad for their Six Nations Championship campaign. She was given her first start for England in their opening match against Italy on 23 March 2025. In July 2025, she was named in the England squad for the 2025 Rugby World Cup. She featured for England in the 2026 Six Nations Championship as England extended their unbeaten run to 38 matches and won a fifth consecutive grand slam in the event.

== Honours ==
England

- Women's Rugby World Cup
  - (gold) Champion (1): 2025
