= Nia Toliver =

American rugby union player and Olympian (born 1998)

Personal information
- Born: May 3, 1998 (age 28) Los Angeles, California, U.S.
- Occupation: Professional rugby sevens player
- Height: 167 cm (5 ft 6 in)
- Weight: 73 kg (161 lb)

Rugby union career
- Position: Wing
- Current team: Stade Bordelais
Senior career
Years	Team	Apps	(Points)
2018–2020	Hokkaido Barbarians Diana		
2022–2023	Tokyo Sankyu Phoenix		
2024	Nagato Blue Angels		
2025–	Stade Bordelais		
2026	USRC Tigers RFC		
National sevens team
Years	Team		Comps
2024–	United States		6
- Correct as of 19 June 2025

Nia Toliver (born May 3, 1998) is an American rugby union player. She plays for the United States women's national rugby sevens team. She represented the United States at the 2020 Tokyo Olympics, where the USA women's sevens team finished sixth. She is often referred to as "American Lomu" for her running style.

During the 2024–25 World Rugby Sevens Series, Toliver scored 13 tries across the opening tournaments in Dubai and Cape Town and received the HSBC SVNS Women's Rookie of the Year Award and was nominated for the Try of the Year Award in 2025. Previously, she has also competed professionally in Japan’s Taiyo Seimei Women's Sevens Series, earning multiple tournament MVP honors.

== Early life and education ==
Toliver was raised in Los Angeles. She began playing rugby in 2013 with the Inner-City Education Foundation (ICEF) program under the direction of former international player Stuart Krohn. She quickly became a standout athlete, earning selection to USA Rugby's Girls' High School All-American teams in both 7s and 15s by 2015. In October 2015, Sports Illustrated named her High School Athlete of the Month, noting her leadership of the team and recording a 12.1-second 100-meter time. She toured Europe playing rugby with the ICEF team. Toliver was invited to USA Olympic development training camps whilst she was a high school student.

Toliver spent time in New Zealand as a teenager, where she attended Burnside High School's sports program in Christchurch and played senior women's rugby for the University of Canterbury Rugby Football Club as a winger, scoring eight tries in her first three games. In 2017, she returned to the United States on a rugby scholarship at American International College in Massachusetts.

== Career ==
Following college, Toliver played in Japan's Taiyo Seimei Women's Sevens Series for Hokkaido Barbarians Diana, Nagato Blue Angels and Tokyo Sankyu Phoenix. In 2022, she was named MVP of the Shizuoka (Ecopa) and Hirosaki tournaments, scoring 16 tries in five matches at Ecopa, and contributed to titles for Tokyo Sankyu Phoenix and Nagato Blue Angels.

Toliver competed in women's rugby sevens at the Tokyo 2020 Olympic Games, making on-field appearances in pool-stage wins against Japan on 29 July 2021 and Australia on 30 July 2021.

In 2024, Toliver rejoined the U.S. national sevens team and made her World Rugby Sevens Series debut in Dubai, part of the 2024-25 SVNS series. She scored a try in the USA's opening match against Great Britain and finished the tournament with six tries as USA finished fifth overall. In December 2024, she played as USA reached the final of the 2024 South Africa Sevens, her efforts including two tries in their 31-0 semi-final victory over Fiji. Across the Dubai and Cape Town legs, she totaled 13 tries. In April 2025, she was named HSBC SVNS Women's Rookie of the Year for the 2024-25 season and nominated for HSBC SVNS Women's Try of the Year for her try vs. Australia in Cape Town.

In October 2026 Toliver joined USRC Tigers RFC in the Hong Kong premiership.

== Style of play ==
Her play has a combination of speed and power. When she was playing in New Zealand she earned the nickname of the "American Lomu" due to her thundering running style being compared to Jonah Lomu. As a teenager she recorded a personal best of 11.85 seconds in the 100-metre sprint.

== Personal life ==
Toliver was born in Los Angeles to Sheri and Nick Toliver, and has two sisters, Niquise and Rashida. Toliver's older sister, Rashida Toliver, also played rugby and was a major influence on Nia's career. Nia has said she was "inspired to take up the sport" by her sister.

== Awards ==
- USA Rugby High School All-American (Girls' 7s & 15s), Selected 2014–2015
- Sports Illustrated High School Athlete of the Month, October 2015
- Taiyo Seimei Women's Sevens Series MVP
  - Shizuoka (Ecopa) tournament, 2022
  - Hirosaki tournament, 2022
- HSBC SVNS Women's Rookie of the Year, 2025 season
