= Makarita Baleinadogo =

France international rugby union player

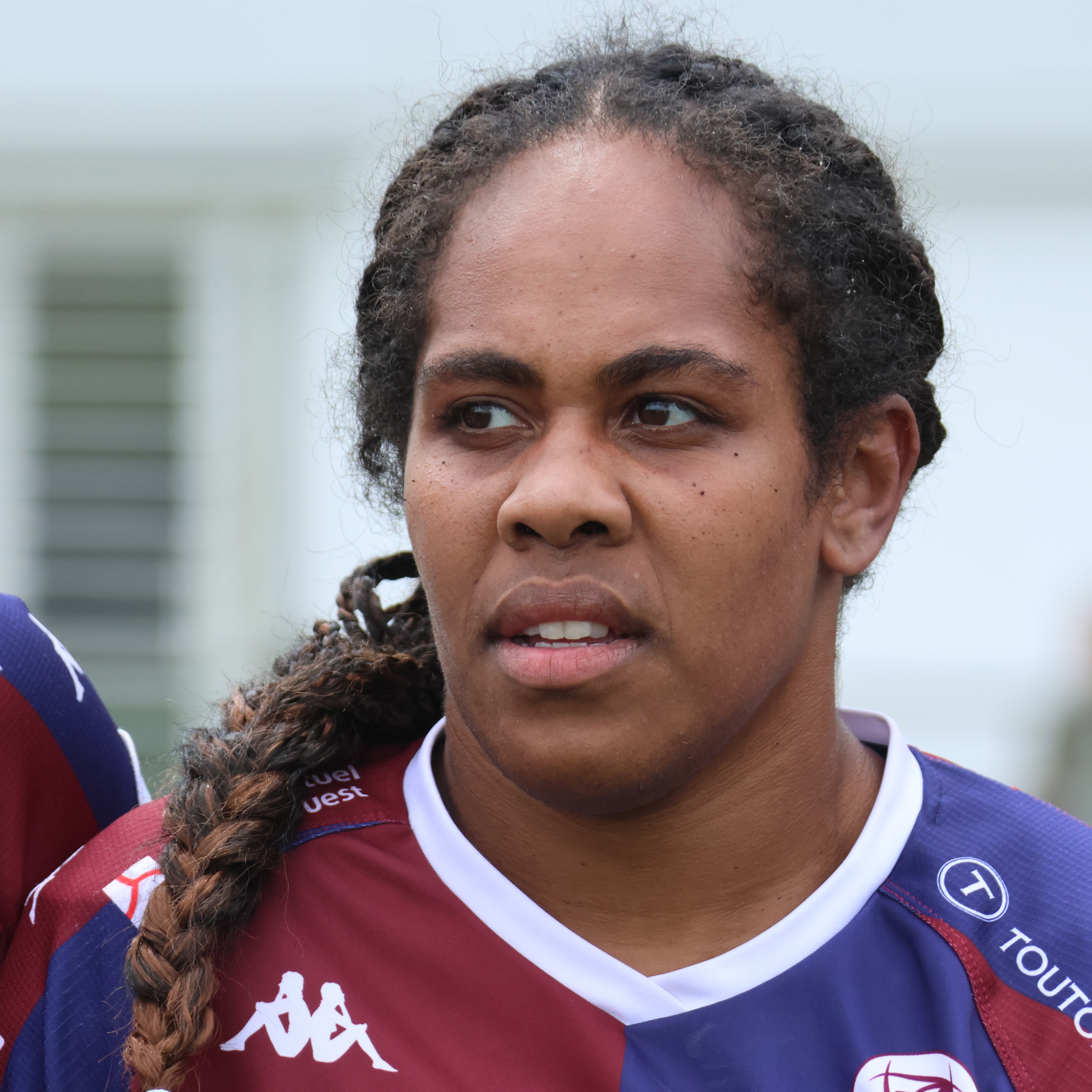
- Makarita Baleinadogo in 2026, playing for Stade Bordelais
- Born: 9 February 2002 (age 24) Tailevu Province, Fiji
- Height: 167 cm (5 ft 6 in)
- Notable relative: Dan Baleinadogo (father)

Rugby union career
- Position(s): Back row, Prop
- Current team: Stade Bordelais
Amateur team(s)
Years	Team	Apps	(Points)
2015–2016	AS Mâcon		
2015–2018	CS Annonay		
2018–2020	FC Grenoble Amazones		
Senior career
Years	Team	Apps	(Points)
2020–2024	FC Grenoble Amazones		
2024–	Stade Bordelais		
International career
Years	Team	Apps	(Points)
2025–	France	1	(0)

Makarita Baleinadogo (born 9 February 2002 in Tailevu Province, Fiji) is a Fijian born French rugby union player who can play in the back row or at prop. She plays for Stade Bordelais, and won the Élite 1 in 2025 with the club.

== Early life and career ==
She was born in 2002 in the province of Tailevu Province, Fiji. Her father, Daniele Baleinadogo, is a former Fijian international rugby union player. She moved to France in 2010 and began playing rugby in 2015 at AS Mâcon, where her father played, she then played for CS Annonay.

== Rugby career ==
In 2018, she joined FC Grenoble Amazones. In both 2019 and 2020, she was selected for the French national team's training squad for players that are under 18 years.

She moved to Stade Bordelais in 2024 and won the 2024–25 Élite 1 with the team. In June 2025, she was selected for the French Under-20 team to play in the Six Nations Summer Series in Wales.

In August 2025 she was named in the French squad for the 2025 Women's Rugby World Cup by head coaches Gaëlle Mignot & David Ortiz. She made her international debut during the tournament on 31 August, she came off the bench in their 84–5 annihilation of Brazil.
