= Taylor McKnight =

Canada international rugby union player

- Born: 5 April 2003 (age 23) Whitchurch-Stouffville, Canada
- Height: 155 cm (5 ft 1 in)

Rugby union career
- Position: Hooker
Senior career
Years	Team	Apps	(Points)
2021–	Guelph Gryphons		(0)
	Aurora Barbarians		(0)
International career
Years	Team	Apps	(Points)
2025–	Canada	2	(20)
Medal record
Representing Canada
Women's rugby union
World Cup
Silver medal – second place	2025 England	Team competition

Taylor McKnight (born 5 April 2003) is a Canadian rugby union player playing as a Hooker.

== Early life and career ==
McKnight was born in Whitchurch-Stouffville, Canada. In 2021, she played for the Guelph Gryphons of the University of Guelph. She was a Bio-medical science major at the University of Guelph.

== Rugby career ==
McKnight was selected for the Canadian tour to South Africa in June 2025 for a two-test series in preparation for the World Cup. She earned her first international cap for Canada against South Africa a month later.

In August, she was subsequently named in the Canadian side for the 2025 Women's Rugby World Cup in England.
