= Stade Bordelais Women =

Rugby union club in Bordeaux, France

Stade Bordelais
- Nickname: The Lionesses
- Founded: 2006; 20 years ago
- Ground(s): Stade Sainte-Germaine; Stade Chaban-Delmas
- League: Élite 1
- 2024–25: Champions (3rd title)

Official website
- www.stade-bordelais.com

Stade Bordelais Women are a French women's rugby union club, based in Bordeaux. They were founded in 2006 and participate in the Élite 1 competition, which is the top division of women's rugby in France. They are three-time Élite 1 champions having three consecutive victories in 2023, 2024 and 2025.

== History ==
In 2006, the two historic rugby clubs of the Bordeaux metropolitan area, Stade Bordelais and Club Athlétique Bordeaux Bègles Gironde, merged to create Union Bordeaux Bègles, a pooling of resources that only covers the senior and youth teams of the two entities.

Stade Bordelais then formed a women's team, with 32 registered players, to continue to compete on the national stage. The team joined Elite 2 in 2008. After losing in the final in 2011, they won the French second division championship in 2012. However, the Lionesses were unable to maintain their place in Elite 1 and were relegated to Elite 2 at the end of the 2013–14 season.

In October 2013, Stade Bordelais and ASPTT Bordeaux merged under the name Stade Bordelais ASPTT. Five seasons later, ASPTT regained its independence in October 2018, in order to join the ASPTT sports federation; Stade bordelais then regained its former name.

In 2018, following the reorganization of the women's divisions and the expansion of the 1st division from 8 to 16 clubs, the Lionnes joined Elite 1.

In 2020, Stade Bordelais entrusted the presidency of its women's section to three former rugby players, Guy Accoceberry, Patrick Laporte, and Laurent Treuil. That same year, four Quebec players joined the Lionnes: in Canada, lockdown measures against the COVID-19 pandemic had suspended rugby activities, so Justine Pelletier, Fabiola Forteza, Karen Paquin, and Andréanne Valois found a club in Bordeaux where they could continue training and competing. While the latter two left France after a few seasons, other Canadians temporarily joined the Bordeaux team: Alexandra Tessier, Gabrielle Senft, Magali Harvey, and Sarah-Maude Lachance. Their discipline and professionalism helped the Lionnes to gain momentum.

In 2021 the team did not reach the final stages of the Elite 1 championship, and lost in the semi-finals in 2022. Under the guidance of coaches Florent Torregaray and Fabrice Nivart, they won their first championship during the 2022–23 season.

In 2023, François Ratier, former coach of the Canadian women's and men's national teams, was contacted by the club to take over as head coach. He was assisted by Fabrice Nivart in the forwards and by former French international Rose Thomas in the backs. The team won the championship again in the 2023–24 season, and for a third consecutive time in 2024–25.

== Current squad ==
2025–26 Élite 1 season squad:

Note: Flags indicate national union under World Rugby eligibility rules. Players may hold more than one non-World Rugby nationality.

Player	Position	Union
**Agathe Gérin**	Hooker	France
Orane Jambes	Hooker	France
Oihana Tome Belmonte	Hooker	France
Marion Zdzioblo	Hooker	France
**Makarita Baleinadogo**	Prop	France
**Annaëlle Deshayes**	Prop	France
**Alexandria Ellis**	Prop	Canada
Maïlys Mailagi	Prop	France
Laura Morelle	Prop	France
**Alessia Pilani**	Prop	Italy
**Madoussou Fall Raclot**	Lock	France
Sarah Gbizie	Lock	France
**Hina Ikahehegi**	Lock	France
**Hallie Taufo'ou**	Lock	United States
**Sara Tounesi**	Lock	Italy
Jennifer Vander Elst	Lock	France
**Axelle Berthoumieu**	Back row	France
Adèle Besson	Back row	France
**Khoudedia Cissokho**	Back row	France
Elsa Peyras	Back row	France
Taylor Price	Back row	Canada

Player	Position	Union
Manon Delbos	Scrum-half	France
Taylor Donato	Scrum-half	Canada
**Justine Pelletier**	Scrum-half	Canada
**Carla Arbez**	Fly-half	France
**Emma Coudert**	Fly-half	France
Maiana Gony	Fly-half	France
**Montserrat Amédée**	Centre	France
Margaux Bernet	Centre	France
**Nassira Konde**	Centre	France
**Sarah-Maude Lachance**	Centre	Canada
Aubane Rousset	Centre	France
Laureane Berrieix	Wing	France
Kalea Berroyer	Wing	France
**Joanna Grisez**	Wing	France
Marie Ibañez	Wing	France
Louise Lavabre	Wing	France
Nia Toliver	Wing	United States
**Morgane Bourgeois**	Fullback	France
Maud Barcelot	Back	France

- Senior 15s internationally capped players are listed in **bold**.

== Honors ==
- Élite 1
  - Champions (3): 2023, 2024, 2025

== Finals results ==
Season	(gold) Champion	Score	(silver) Runner-up	Ref	Highlights
2023	Stade Bordelais	27–23	Blagnac Rugby Féminin		
2024	Stade Bordelais	32–17	ASM Romagnat		
2025	Stade Bordelais	32–24	Stade Toulousain Rugby		
