= Alessia Pilani =

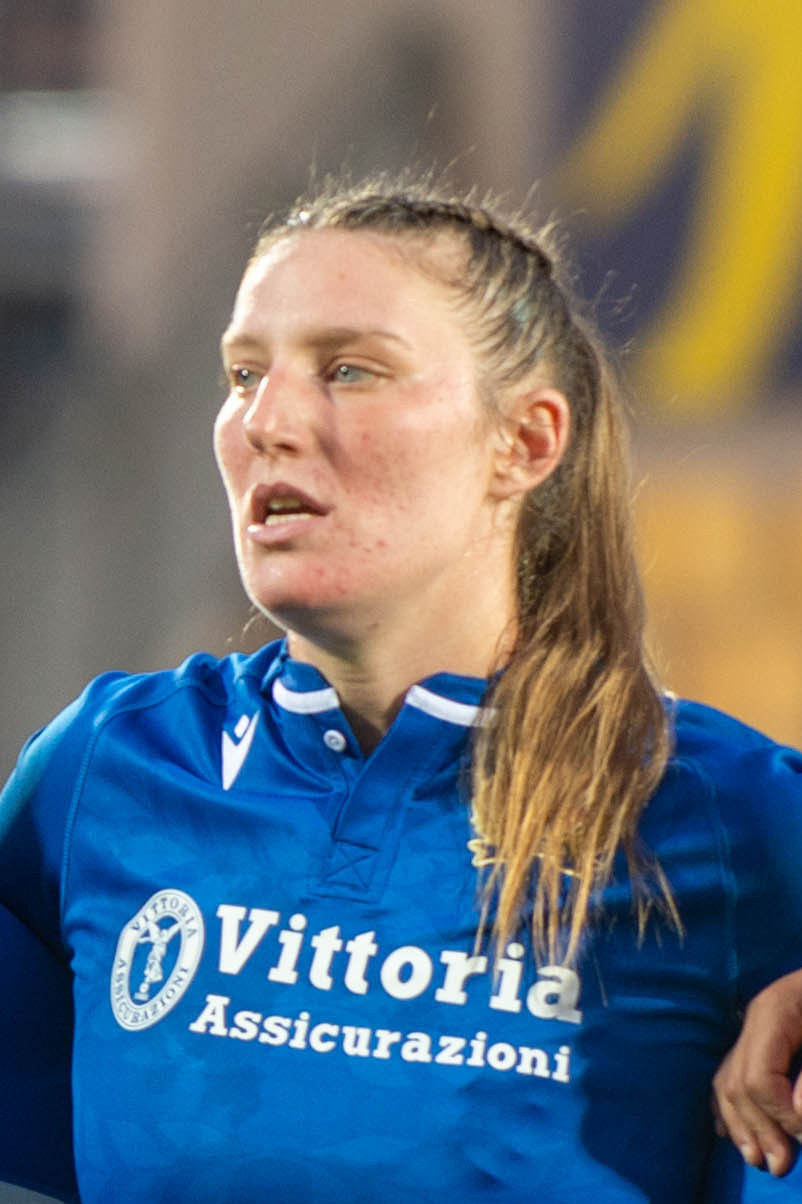
- Pilani before a test match against Japan in Parma, 2023.
- Born: 6 March 1999 (age 27)
- Height: 184 cm (6 ft 0 in)
- Weight: 95 kg (209 lb; 14 st 13 lb)

Rugby union career
- Position: Prop
Senior career
Years	Team	Apps	(Points)
2017–2019	Imola		(0)
2019–2025	Colorno		(0)
2025–	Stade Bordelais		(0)
International career
Years	Team	Apps	(Points)
2023–	Italy	9	(0)

Alessia Pilani (born 6 March 1999) is an Italian rugby union player. She represented Italy at the 2025 Women's Rugby World Cup.

== Early life and career ==
Pilani was born in Lugo but raised in Massa Lombarda. She participated in cycling until the age of 17, she won bronze in 2016 in the 500 m time trial at the Italian junior championship.

== Rugby career ==
Pilani followed her brother and joined the Imola rugby club after years of cycling. Shortly after joining Colorno in 2019, club activities were cancelled for two seasons due to the COVID-19 pandemic.

When the Serie A Elite competition resumed at the end of 2021, her performances in the following two seasons earned her a call-up to the national team against Wales on the final day of the 2023 Six Nations, however, she did not get to earn her first cap. She eventually made her international debut in July 2023, it was against Spain in Piacenza in an official qualifying match for the inaugural WXV tournament later that year.

At the end of the 2024–25 Serie A Elite season she moved to France to join Stade Bordelais.

Pilani was called-up to the side to compete in the 2025 Six Nations. She was subsequently named in the Italian squad for the 2025 Women's Rugby World Cup in England.
