= Marie Morland =

France international rugby union player

- Born: 5 October 2005 (age 21)
- Height: 178 cm (5 ft 10 in)

Rugby union career
- Position: Loose Forward
Senior career
Years	Team	Apps	(Points)
2023–	Lyon OU		(0)
International career
Years	Team	Apps	(Points)
2024	France U-20		(5)
2025–	France	2	(5)

Marie Morland (born 5 October 2005) is a French rugby union player. She competed for France at the 2025 Women's Rugby World Cup.

== Rugby career ==
Morland is from Chalon-sur-Saône, and started playing rugby union at Rugby Tango Chalonnais before joining the Dijon Bourgogne women's rugby club and then Lyon OU in 2023. Her older brother Louis Morland is also a rugby player.

In April 2024, she was called up to the French Under-20 team for the U20s Six Nations Summer Series. She scored a try in her sides 57–12 thrashing of Wales in the opening game. Later that year in December, she was also nominated for the rising star award of French women's rugby.

In January 2025, Morland was called up to participate in a training camp organized in Spain. In August, she was uncapped when she was named in the French side to the Women's Rugby World Cup in England. She started in her international debut during the World Cup on 31 August, she scored a try in her sides 84–5 annihilation of Brazil.
