= Ayumu Kokaji =

Japan international rugby union player

- Born: 24 November 2000 (age 25)
- Height: 160 cm (5 ft 3 in)
- Weight: 80 kg (176 lb; 12 st 8 lb)

Rugby union career
- Position: Hooker
Senior career
Years	Team	Apps	(Points)
- Hanazono Hollyhocks
2021–	Tokyo Sankyu Phoenix		
International career
Years	Team	Apps	(Points)
2019–	Japan	11	(15)

Ayumu Kokaji (born 24 November 2000) is a Japanese rugby union player. She competed for Japan at the 2025 Women's Rugby World Cup.

== Background ==
Kokaji started playing rugby at the age of four and graduated from Sakai Rugby School. After graduating from Annan Gakuen High School in 2019, she enrolled at Morinomiya Medical College. Her older brother Yuta, plays Prop for the Toshiba Brave Lupus Tokyo in the Japan Rugby League One competition.

== Rugby career ==
On 19 July 2019, she earned her first Test cap for Japan against Australia during their Australian tour. She originally played in the backs but switched to the forwards at the recommendation of Head coach, Lesley McKenzie.

Kokaji joined Tokyo Sankyu Phoenix in 2021. She missed selection for the delayed Rugby World Cup that was held in New Zealand in 2022 due to injury. She was part of the Tokyo Sankyu Phoenix side that won the 10th National Women's Rugby Football Championship in 2024.

On 28 July 2025, she was named in the Japanese side to the Women's Rugby World Cup in England.
