= Dan Baleinadogo =

Fijian rugby union player (born 1978)

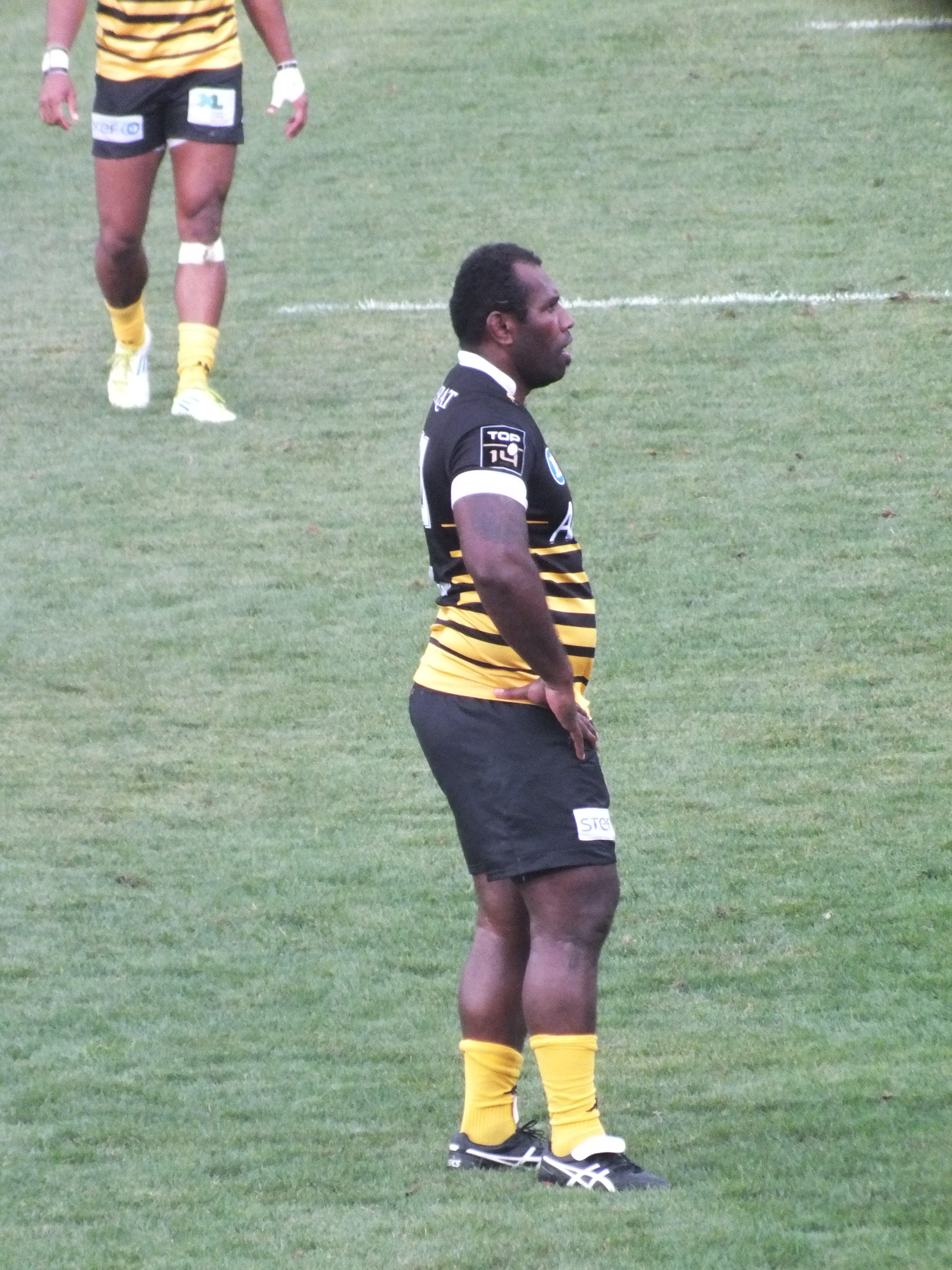
- Full name: Daniele Baleinadogo
- Born: 3 April 1978 (age 48) Suva, Fiji
- Height: 6 ft 0 in (183 cm)
- Weight: 238 lb (108 kg)

Rugby union career
- Position: Centre / Wing
International career
Years	Team	Apps	(Points)
2001–07	Fiji	10	(0)

Daniele Baleinadogo (born 3 April 1978) is a Fijian former international rugby union player.

== Rugby career ==
Baleinadogo was a physical three-quarter from Suva, capped 10 times for Fiji. His international career spanned from 2001 to 2007, during which time he played professional rugby in Japan, for Toyota Shoki and Mazda.

After losing his place in the national team on the verge of the 2007 Rugby World Cup, Baleinadogo joined French professional rugby in 2008, playing three seasons for Pro D2 club Aurillac. He also had one season in the Top 14 with Stade Montois and later competed for AS Mâcon in the Fédérale 1.

== See also ==
- List of Fiji national rugby union players
