= Beth Buttimer =

Irish rugby union player

- Born: Beth Buttimer; August 18, 2005 (age 21) County Tipperary, Ireland
- Height: 170 cm (5 ft 7 in)
- Weight: 73 kg (161 lb)

Rugby union career
- Position: Hooker
- Current team: UL Bohemian; Munster Women; Clovers
Senior career
Years	Team	Apps	(Points)
2023–present	UL Bohemian	17	(35)
2023–present	Clovers	9	(25)
2023–present	Munster	3	(0)
International career
Years	Team	Apps	(Points)
2024–2025	Ireland U20	2	
2025–present	Ireland	0	
- Correct as of 6 September 2025

Beth Buttimer (Irish language: Eilis Ní Buitiméir) (born 18 August 2005) is an Irish rugby union player who plays as a hooker for UL Bohemian RFC, Munster Women, the Clovers in the Celtic Challenge, and the Ireland women's national rugby union team. They were selected for the senior Ireland squad for the 2025 Women's Rugby World Cup.

== Career ==
=== Early life and club career ===
Buttimer hails from County Tipperary and was born on August 18, 2005 and grew up in Cahir, Ireland. They began their rugby journey at a young age, playing rugby union at age 14 with Fethard RFC. progressing through local clubs before joining UL Bohemian RFC in the 2023–24 season, making 17 appearances and scoring 35 points across two seasons in the Energia All-Ireland League Women's Division 1.

They study at the University of Limerick.

=== Provincial career ===
From 2023 onwards, they played for Munster Rugby Women, UL Bohemian RFC, and the Clovers in the Celtic Challenge.

Buttimer has represented Munster Women in the Women's Senior Interprovincial Championship, appearing in three matches during the 2023–24 season.

They have been a standout performer for the Clovers in the Celtic Challenge, scoring five tries across nine matches in the 2023–24 season.

== International career ==
Buttimer earned their first senior call-up for Ireland in 2024, aged 18 .

In February 2025, they was called up again to train with the Ireland women's national rugby union team ahead of the 2025 Women's Six Nations Championship. They were selected in August to represent Ireland at the 2025 Women's Rugby World Cup.

They play as a hooker, a position requiring both physicality and precision in set-pieces. Buttimer has been highlighted in Irish media for their rapid rise and contributions to women's rugby, particularly as a representative of County Tipperary on the national stage.
