= Agathe Sochat =

French international rugby union player

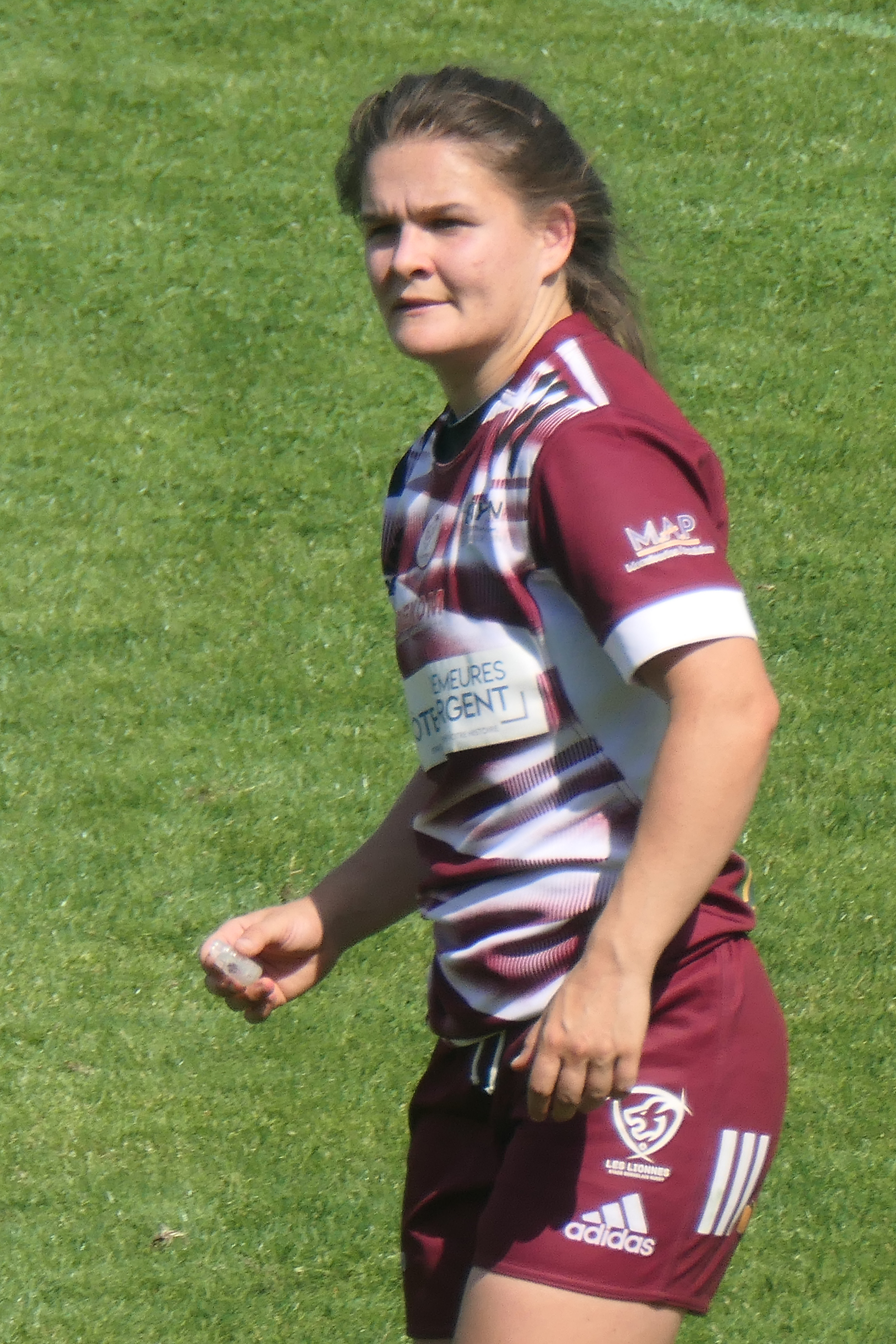
- Gérin with Stade Bordelais in 2022
- Born: 21 May 1995 (age 31)
- Height: 163 cm (5 ft 4 in)

Rugby union career
- Position: Hooker
Senior career
Years	Team	Apps	(Points)
2021–	Stade Bordelais		(0)
International career
Years	Team	Apps	(Points)
2016–	France	63	(65)

Agathe Gérin (née Sochat; born 21 May 1995) is a French rugby union player who plays for Stade Bordelais and the France women's national rugby union team. She competed at the delayed 2021 Rugby World Cup.

== Rugby career ==
Sochat played for Stade Bordelais between 2013 and 2016 before joining Montpellier Hérault Rugby with whom she won the Élite 1 National Championships in 2017, 2018, and 2019 before rejoining Stade Bordelais in August 2021.

In December 2021 she was named in World Rugby's Women's Team of the Year.

In 2022, She was named in France's team for the delayed 2021 Rugby World Cup in New Zealand.

She was named in the French side for the 2025 Women's Six Nations Championship on 7 March. On 2 August 2025, she was selected in the squad for the Women's Rugby World Cup in England.

== Personal life ==
Born to Laurent and Christime from Limoges, she began playing rugby aged 4 and they supported her in combining rugby with studying in Bordeaux and Montpellier. An occupational therapist, during the COVID-19 pandemic, Sochat made masks for fellow frontline workers. In March 2022 she had a baby daughter with her wife Adele.
