= Khoudedia Cissokho =

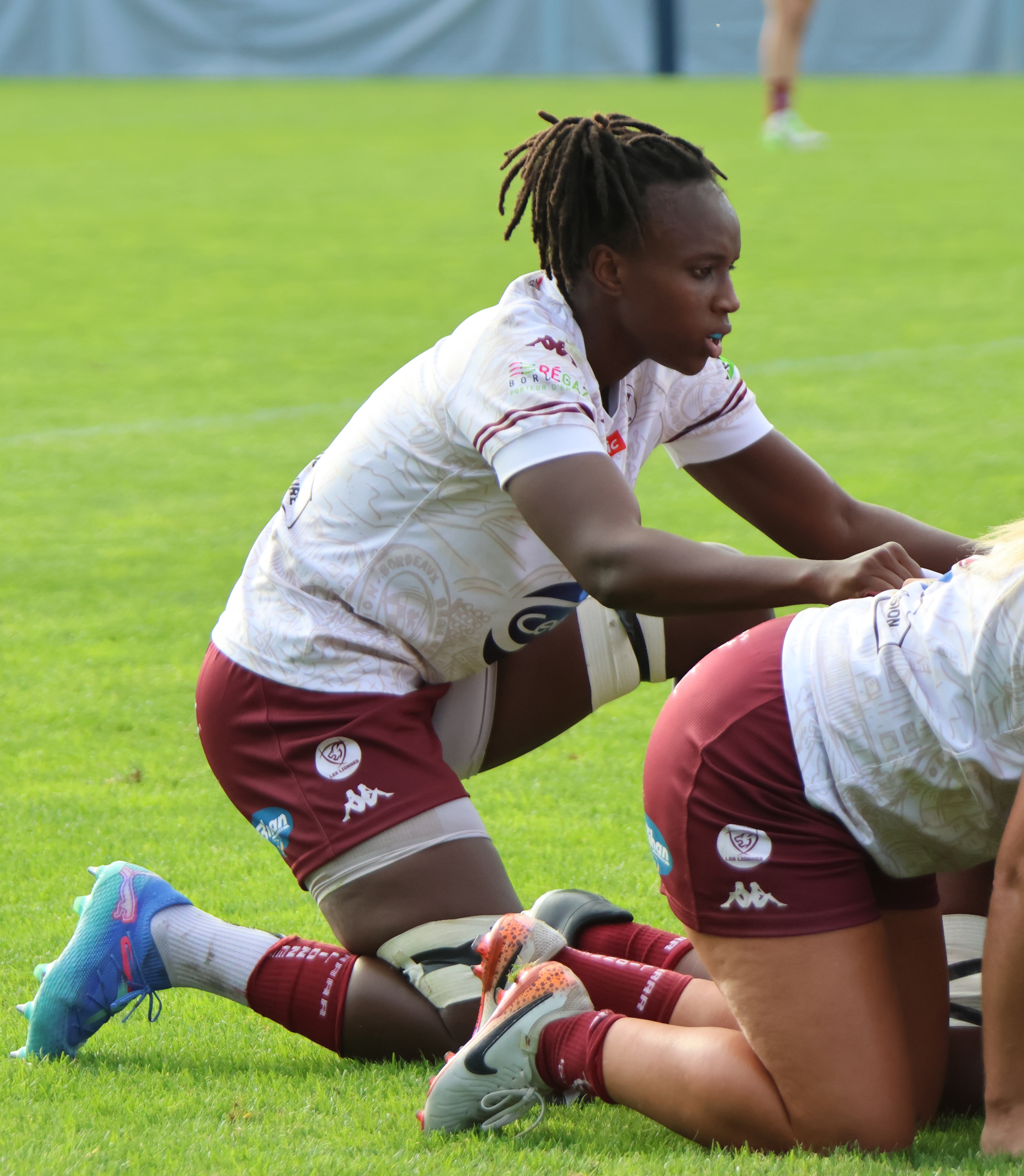
- Cissokho with Stade Bordelais
- Born: 22 June 1999 (age 27) Paris, France
- Height: 174 cm (5 ft 9 in)

Rugby union career
- Position: Loose Forward
Senior career
Years	Team	Apps	(Points)
2019–2021	AC Bobigny 93		(0)
2021–2024	Montpellier		(0)
2024–	Stade Bordelais		(0)
International career
Years	Team	Apps	(Points)
2025–	France	2	(0)

Khoudedia Cissokho (born 22 June 1999) is a French rugby union player.

== Rugby career ==
Cissokho began playing rugby union in Sarcelles in 2010. In 2017, she had a stint at the Brétigny-sur-Orge training and education center, she then played for AC Bobigny 93 from 2019 to 2021.

She represented France in the Under-18 and Under-20 age group, she notably played against England's U-20s team in 2018 and 2019.

After three seasons with Montpellier, she was recruited in 2024 by Stade Bordelais, she helped them win the 2024–2025 Élite 1 championship. She featured in 19 of their 20 matches for the season, including the final.

Cissokho participated in the training squad in preparation for the Rugby World Cup. She was eventually named in the French side to the Women's Rugby World Cup in England.

== Personal life ==
Cissokho is studying for a degree in applied foreign languages at the University of Paris-Nanterre.
