= World Rugby Coach of the Year =

- Date: 2001; 25 years ago
- Presented by: World Rugby
- Formerly called: IRB International Coach of the Year (2004–2007)
- First award: 2001
- 2025 winner: John Mitchell (England Women)

Highlights
- Most awards: Graham Henry (5 times)
- Website: world.rugby/awards

The World Rugby Coach of the Year is awarded by World Rugby in the autumn each year. From 2004 to 2007, the award was called the IRB International Coach of the Year.

== List of winners ==
Year	Coach	Team	Other nominees	Refs
2001	Rod Macqueen	Australia		
2002	Bernard Laporte	France		
2003	Clive Woodward	England		
2004	Jake White	South Africa	Bernard Laporte; Tomaz Morais; Gordon Tietjens	
2005	Graham Henry	New Zealand	Mike Ruddock	
2006	Graham Henry	New Zealand		
2007	Jake White	South Africa		
2008	Graham Henry	New Zealand		
2009	Declan Kidney	Ireland		
2010	Graham Henry	New Zealand		
2011	Graham Henry	New Zealand		
2012	Steve Hansen	New Zealand		
2013	Steve Hansen	New Zealand		
2014	Steve Hansen	New Zealand		
2015	Michael Cheika	Australia	Steve Hansen; Daniel Hourcade; Eddie Jones	
2016	Steve Hansen	New Zealand	Eddie Jones; Ben Ryan	
2017	Eddie Jones	England	Warren Gatland; Steve Hansen	
2018	Joe Schmidt	Ireland	Rassie Erasmus; Steve Hansen	
2019	Rassie Erasmus	South Africa	Warren Gatland; Steve Hansen; Eddie Jones; Jamie Joseph	
2020	Not held			
2021	Simon Middleton	England women	Allan Bunting; Ian Foster; Dave Rennie; Cory Sweeney	
2022	Wayne Smith	New Zealand women	Andy Farrell; Fabien Galthié; Simon Middleton	
2023	Andy Farrell	Ireland	Ian Foster; Jacques Nienaber; Simon Raiwalui	
2024	Jérôme Daret	France sevens		
2025	John Mitchell	England Women		

== Statistics ==
Awards by coach
Coach	Awards		Nominations	
Graham Henry	5	2005, 2006, 2008, 2010, 2011		
Steve Hansen	4	2012, 2013, 2014, 2016	4	2015, 2017, 2018, 2019
Jake White	2	2004, 2007		
Eddie Jones	1	2017	3	2015, 2016, 2019
Andy Farrell	1	2023	1	2022
Simon Middleton	1	2021	1	2022
Rassie Erasmus	1	2019	1	2018
Bernard Laporte	1	2002	1	2004
Wayne Smith	1	2022		
Joe Schmidt	1	2018		
Michael Cheika	1	2015		
Declan Kidney	1	2009		
Clive Woodward	1	2003		
Rod Macqueen	1	2001		
Jérôme Daret	1	2024		
John Mitchell	1	2025		
