= Noeline Taurua =

New Zealand netball player and coach

Dame Noeline Taurua DNZM
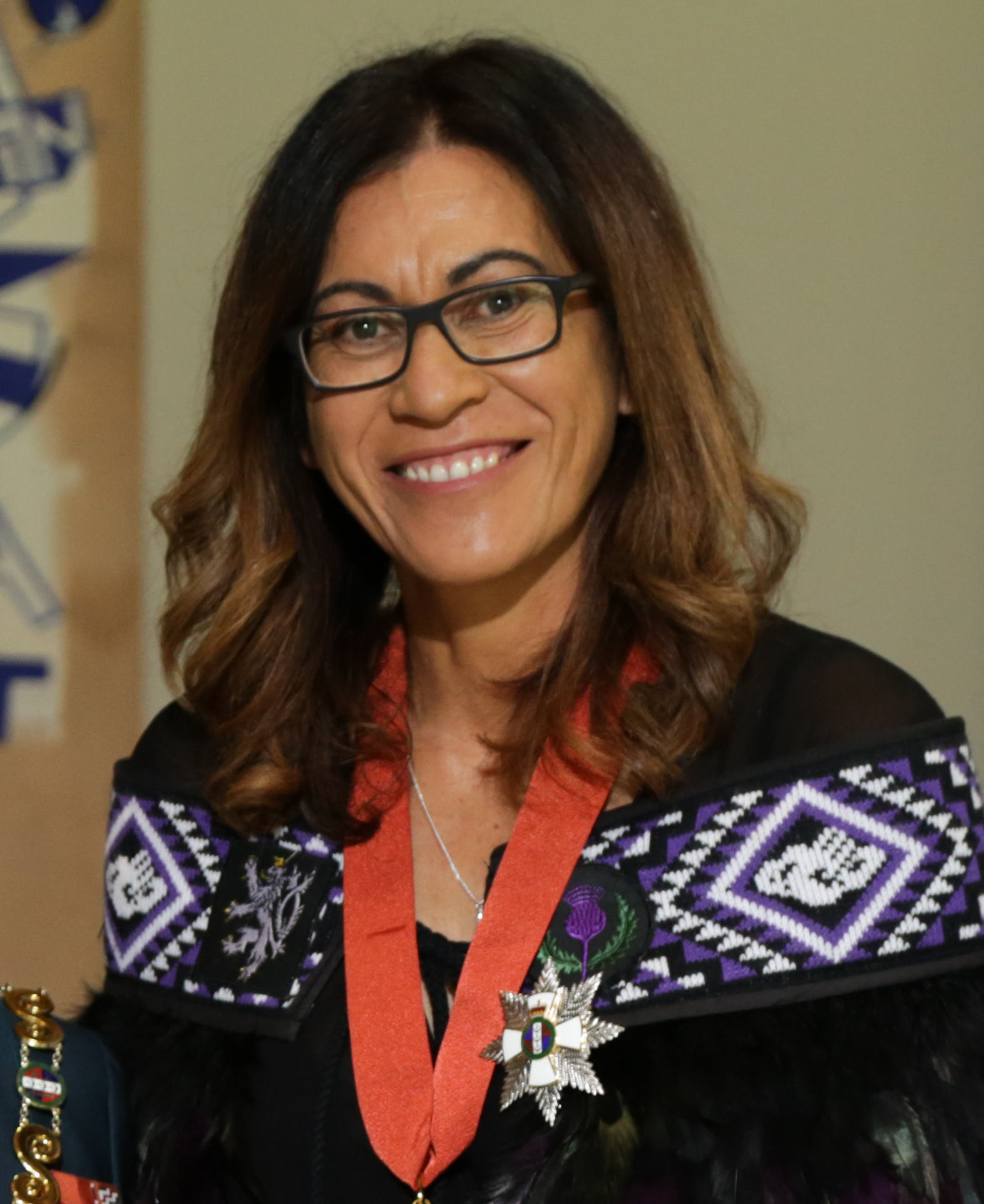
- Taurua in 2020

Personal information
- Full name: Noeline Taurua
- Born: 26 March 1968 (age 58) Papakura, New Zealand

Netball career
- Playing positions: GA, WA
| Years | National team | Caps |
| 1994–99 | New Zealand | 34 |
Coaching career
- Years: Team
- 2002–13: Waikato/Bay of Plenty Magic
- 2016: Southern Steel
- 2017–19: Sunshine Coast Lightning
- 2018–present: New Zealand
Medal record
Representing New Zealand
World Netball Championships
| Bronze medal – third place | 1995 Birmingham | Netball |
Commonwealth Games
| Silver medal – second place | 1998 Kuala Lumpur | Netball |

Dame Noeline Taurua DNZM (born 26 March 1968) is a New Zealand international netball coach and former representative player. She served as head coach of the New Zealand national netball team, the Silver Ferns, until she was suspended in September 2025. In late October 2025, Taurua was reinstated as head coach following protracted negotiations.

== Early life ==
Taurua was born in Papakura to Kingi and Polly Taurua. Her ancestry is Ngāpuhi on her father's side, and Ngāti Whātua on her mother's side. Taurua is the youngest of five children. She expressed an interest in Athletics in her schooling years. Taurua attended Taupo-nui-a-Tia College.

== Playing career ==
Taurua was a member of the Silver Ferns from 1993–99. During that time, she won a silver medal at the 1998 Commonwealth Games in Kuala Lumpur and a bronze medal at the 1995 Netball World Championships in Birmingham. A knee injury in 1999 ended her playing career, having played in 34 test matches for the Silver Ferns.

== Coaching career ==
In 2011, Taurua acted as assistant coach to the Silver Ferns alongside Ruth Aitken. The following year, she accepted an official position as Silver Ferns assistant coach after being offered the role several times. In domestic netball, Taurua coached the Waikato Bay of Plenty Magic from 2002–13, leading them to two National Bank Cup titles (2005, 2006) and one ANZ Championship title (2012).

In 2013, Taurua retired from coaching duties for the Silver Ferns after one and a half seasons, citing family reasons. She also stepped down as head coach of the Magic after eleven years at the franchise. Her replacement at the Magic was former New South Wales Swifts coach Julie Fitzgerald. Taurua later accepted a role as head coach for Southern Steel in their final 2016 ANZ Championship season.

After the dissolution of the ANZ Championship in 2016, the Sunshine Coast Lightning announced the signing of Taurua heading into the 2017 season of the Suncorp Super Netball league in Australia. Taurua coached the Lightning to back-to-back premierships in 2017 and 2018, and a minor premiership in 2019. She was selected as the head coach of the New Zealand national netball team in August 2018. During her time as Silver Ferns head coach, New Zealand won the 2018 Fast5 Netball World Series and 2019 Netball World Cup. As well as being the national team coach, Taurua continued to coach the Lightning in Australia. On 20 August 2019, Taurua announced her departure from the Lightning after her third year coaching the team.

Taurua was not shortlisted for the role of head coach in 2015, however, after the resignation of Janine Southby from a failed Commonwealth Games campaign, she accepted the job as the Silver Ferns 11th coach.

In 2019, Taurua coached the Silver Ferns to a 52–51 win over the Australian Diamonds in the Netball World Cup in Liverpool, a competition the team hadn't won since 2003. Taurua then coached the team to win the 2021 Constellation Cup, ending a nine year drought.

In February 2021, Taurua confirmed that she would coach the Silver Ferns until 2023. The team won a Bronze medal at the 2022 Commonwealth Games in Birmingham.

Despite a disappointing 2023 Netball World Cup with the Silver Ferns finishing fourth, their worst ever in history, Taurua's coaching was still held in high regard and her contract was extended until January 2024. The Silver Ferns coach role was opened to applicants in January 2024 in which Taurua confirmed she would be reapplying for the next four year cycle. Taurua was retained as the Silver Ferns coach in April 2024, although only contracted until 2026 she expressed an interest to continue until the 2027 Netball World Cup. Success followed Taurua again when she coached the Silver Ferns to win the 2024 Constellation Cup to a 3–1 victory over the Australian Diamonds.

Taurua is known for her strict fitness criteria for any Silver Fern trialists and players.

On 10 September 2025, Netball New Zealand suspended Taurua as coach of the Silver Ferns amidst concerns about her management and alleged bullying. Following failed negotiations between Taurua and Netball New Zealand, the sporting body sidelined Taurua for the rest of the 2025 season. After negotiations, Netball New Zealand reinstated Taurua as the Silver Ferns' coach on 25 October, effective late 2025.

Taurua coached the Silver Ferns to a gold medal at the 2026 Commonwealth Games their first since the 2010 Commonwealth Games .

== Awards and honors ==
- 2018: Queensland Sport Coach of the Year
- 2018: Tai Tokerau Māori Sports Awards – Coach of the Year
- 2019: Matariki Awards – Te Waitā Award for Sport
- 2020: Halberg Award Coach of the year

In the 2020 New Year Honours, Taurua was appointed a Dame Companion of the New Zealand Order of Merit for services to netball.

Taurua was appointed to the High Performance Sport New Zealand board in September 2022, to work alongside athletic gold medalist Valerie Adams, Black Sox coach Don Tricker and Paralympic swimmer Duane Kale.

By her schooling in Taupō, she was inducted into the famed Lake Taupo District 'Wall of Fame' displayed in the circulatory spaces of the AC Baths.

== Personal life ==
Taurua is married to Edward Goldsmith, with whom she has five children. They divide their time between their homes in Mount Maunganui and Pukehina Beach.

Awards
| Preceded by Gordon Walker | Halberg Awards – Coach of the Year; 2019 | Succeeded by Gordon Walker |
