= Halberg Awards =

Sports awards in New Zealand

The Halberg Awards are a set of awards, given annually since 1949, recognising New Zealand's top sporting achievements. They are named for New Zealand middle-distance runner and Olympic gold medalist Sir Murray Halberg. The initial award was handed out in 1949, and continued until 1960 under the auspices of the NZ Sportsman magazine. Since 1963, the awards have been organised by the Halberg Disability Sport Foundation, and the number of award categories has grown to eight.

== History ==
The annual award was started in 1949 by NZ Sportsman magazine founders Maurice O’Connor and Jack Fairbairn. The award was designed by them and bought from Walker and Hall for £195 NZ. The original inscription on the trophy was Fairburn and O’Connors words: "The New Zealand Sportsman's Trophy to be awarded annually to the New Zealand athlete whose personal performances or example, has had the most beneficial effect on the advancement of sport in the country". Awarding of the New Zealand Sportsman's Trophy ceased along with publication of NZ Sportsman in 1960.

After a two-year hiatus, Murray Halberg revived the event in 1963 through the Halberg Disability Sport Foundation. The rules were altered in 1971 to allow teams to win the award, which that year went to the New Zealand eight.

The Awards are presented at a dinner which traditionally rotates between the New Zealand cities of Dunedin, Christchurch, Wellington and Auckland, and which in recent years has been broadcast live on television. Over time, the award was expanded to include New Zealand Sportswoman of the year, New Zealand Team of the year, Sky Sport Coach of the year, Emerging Talent and Halberg Disability Sport Foundation Disabled Sportsperson of the Year awards, as well as the Lion Foundation Lifetime Achievement Award, the Sport New Zealand Leadership Award and an award for New Zealand's Favourite Sporting Moment. The award was eventually renamed in Murray Halberg's honour, and since then the supreme award has been known as the Halberg award.

The Awards help the Halberg Disability Sport Foundation to raise funds, which are then used to enhance the lives of physically disabled young people, their families and communities, by enabling them to participate in sport.

The awards for 2019 were held on 13 February 2020, prior to COVID-19 pandemic halting large events. With international sporting events during 2020 affected by COVID-19 pandemic, it was decided to award a decade championship at the 2021 ceremony. The previous winners between 2010 and 2019 across the eight award categories are eligible. The decade awards were scheduled for 18 February 2021 to be held in Auckland. After the Auckland region went to COVID-19 Level 3 on 15 February 2021, the Halberg Awards were postponed. The 59th awards were held on February 23, 2022, with audience restrictions because of the COVID-19 red alert level.

== Winners ==
=== Supreme Award ===
The annual award was started in 1949 by NZ Sportsman magazine founders Jack Fairburn and Maurice O’Connor to be awarded annually to the New Zealand athlete whose personal performances or example have had the most beneficial effect on the advancement of sport in New Zealand, as selected by a team of national sporting journalists. The title was "Sportsman of the Year Award" which was awarded annually until 1960 and was discontinued until 1963 when a charity set up by the 1958 winner, Murray Halberg, continued the event from 1963 onwards. The Halberg Disability Sport Foundation renamed the award in 1987 to the Halberg Award, and started having gender-specific awards, introducing the Supreme Award as a new category chosen from all other award categories.

Hence, the table below shows the (gender-neutral) Sportsman of the Year Award winners as determined by NZ Sportsman (1949–1960), the Sportsman of the Year Award winners as determined by the Halberg Disability Sport Foundation (1963–1986), and the Halberg Award from 1987 onwards.

Year	Name	Sport
1949	Bert Sutcliffe	Cricket
1950	Yvette Williams	Athletics
1951	Ron Jarden	Rugby
1952	Yvette Williams	Athletics
1953	Barry Brown	Boxing
1954	Bob Charles	Golf
1955	John Reid	Cricket
1956	Norman Read	Athletics
1957	Philippa Gould	Swimming
1958	Murray Halberg	Athletics
1959	Don Clarke	Rugby
1960	Peter Snell	Athletics
1961	No award	
1962	No award	
1963	Bob Charles	Golf
1964	Peter Snell	Athletics
1965	Wilson Whineray	Rugby
1966	Roy Williams	Athletics
1967	Denny Hulme	Motorsport
1968	Mike Ryan	Athletics
1969	Chris Bouzaid	Sailing
1970	Harry Kent	Cycling
1971	New Zealand rowing eight	Rowing
1972	New Zealand rowing eight	Rowing
1973	Glenn Turner	Cricket
1974	Dick Tayler	Athletics
1975	John Walker	Athletics
1976	John Walker	Athletics
1977	Ivan Mauger	Motorsport
1978	Gary Hurring	Swimming
1979	Ivan Mauger	Motorsport
1980	Richard Hadlee	Cricket
1981	Allison Roe	Athletics
1982	New Zealand rowing eight	Rowing
1983	Chris Lewis	Tennis
1984	Ian Ferguson	Canoeing
1985	Susan Devoy	Squash
1986	Richard Hadlee	Cricket
1987	All Blacks	Rugby
1988	Mark Todd	Equestrian
1989	Erin Baker	Triathlon
1990	Peter Blake	Sailing
1991	Philippa Baker	Rowing
1992	Annelise Coberger	Alpine skiing
1993	Eisenhower Trophy Team	Golf
1994	Philippa Baker & Brenda Lawson	Rowing
1995	Team New Zealand	Sailing
1996	Danyon Loader	Swimming
1997	Beatrice Faumuina	Athletics
1998	Rob Waddell	Rowing
1999	Rob Waddell	Rowing
2000	Rob Waddell	Rowing
2001	Caroline & Georgina Evers-Swindell	Rowing
2002	Tall Blacks	Basketball
2003	Silver Ferns	Netball
2004	Sarah Ulmer	Cycling
2005	Michael Campbell	Golf
2006	Mahé Drysdale	Rowing
2007	Valerie Vili	Athletics
2008	Valerie Vili	Athletics
2009	Valerie Vili	Athletics
2010	All Whites	Football
2011	All Blacks	Rugby
2012	Hamish Bond & Eric Murray	Rowing
2013	Lydia Ko	Golf
2014	Hamish Bond & Eric Murray	Rowing
2015	All Blacks	Rugby
2016	Lisa Carrington	Canoeing
2017	Team New Zealand	Yachting
2018	Tom Walsh	Athletics
2019	Silver Ferns	Netball
2020	not awarded (COVID-19 pandemic)	
2021	Lisa Carrington	Canoeing
2022	Zoi Sadowski-Synnott	Snowboarding
2023	Lisa Carrington	Canoeing
2024	Lydia Ko	Golf
2025	Hamish Kerr	Athletics

=== Sportsman of the Year ===
Year	Name	Sport
1987	Richard Hadlee	Cricket
1988	Mark Todd	Equestrian
1989	Richard Hadlee	Cricket
1990	Peter Blake	Yachting
1991	Martin Crowe	Cricket
1992	Danyon Loader	Swimming
1993	Phil Tataurangi	Golf
1994	Danyon Loader	Swimming
1995	Jonah Lomu	Rugby
1996	Danyon Loader	Swimming
1997	Jeff Wilson	Rugby
1998	Rob Waddell	Rowing
1999	Rob Waddell	Rowing
2000	Rob Waddell	Rowing
2001	Cameron Brown	Triathlon
2002	Craig Perks	Golf
2003	Ben Fouhy	Canoeing
2004	Hamish Carter	Triathlon
2005	Michael Campbell	Golf
2006	Mahé Drysdale	Rowing
2007	Mahé Drysdale	Rowing
2008	Scott Dixon	Motorsport
2009	Mahé Drysdale	Rowing
2010	Richie McCaw	Rugby
2011	Richie McCaw	Rugby
2012	Mahé Drysdale	Rowing
2013	Scott Dixon	Motorsport
2014	Brendon McCullum	Cricket
2015	Kane Williamson	Cricket
2016	Mahé Drysdale	Rowing
2017	Tom Walsh	Athletics
2018	Tom Walsh	Athletics
2019	Israel Adesanya	Mixed martial arts
2020	not awarded (COVID-19 pandemic)	
2021	Kane Williamson	Cricket
2022	Nico Porteous	Freeskiing
2023	Aaron Gate	Cycling
2024	Hamish Kerr	Athletics
2025	Hamish Kerr	Athletics

=== Sportswoman of the Year ===
Year	Name	Sport
1987	Susan Devoy	Squash
1988	Susan Devoy	Squash
1989	Erin Baker	Triathlon
1990	Karen Holliday	Cycling
1991	Phillippa Baker	Rowing
1992	Annelise Coberger	Alpine Skiing
1993	Susan Devoy	Squash
1994	Sarah Ulmer	Cycling
1995	Marnie McGuire	Golf
1996	Barbara Kendall	Sailing
1997	Beatrice Faumuina	Athletics
1998	Barbara Kendall	Sailing
1999	Barbara Kendall	Sailing
2000	Leilani Joyce	Squash
2001	Melissa Moon	Athletics
2002	Barbara Kendall	Sailing
2003	Irene van Dyk	Netball
2004	Sarah Ulmer	Cycling
2005	Kate McIlroy	Athletics
2006	Valerie Vili	Athletics
2007	Valerie Vili	Athletics
2008	Valerie Vili	Athletics
2009	Valerie Vili	Athletics
2010	Valerie Adams	Athletics
2011	Valerie Adams	Athletics
2012	Valerie Adams	Athletics
2013	Lydia Ko	Golf
2014	Lydia Ko	Golf
2015	Lydia Ko	Golf
2016	Lisa Carrington	Canoeing
2017	Lisa Carrington	Canoeing
2018	Lisa Carrington	Canoeing
2019	Lisa Carrington	Canoeing
2020	not awarded (COVID-19 pandemic)	
2021	Lisa Carrington	Canoeing
2022	Zoi Sadowski-Synnott	Snowboarding
2023	Lisa Carrington	Canoeing
2024	Lydia Ko	Golf
2025	Zoi Sadowski-Synnott	Snowboarding

=== Team of the Year ===
Year	Name	Sport
1987	All Blacks	Rugby
1988	Paul MacDonald & Ian Ferguson	Canoeing
1989	New Zealand national netball team	Netball
1990	Steinlager Crew	Yachting
1991	Eisenhower Trophy Team	Golf
1992	Auckland rugby union team	Rugby
1993	Eisenhower Trophy Team	Golf
1994	Philippa Baker & Brenda Lawson	Rowing
1995	Team New Zealand	Yachting
1996	All Blacks	Rugby
1997	All Blacks	Rugby
1998	Equestrian Eventing Team	Equestrian
1999	Black Caps	Cricket
2000	Team New Zealand	Sailing
2001	Caroline & Georgina Evers-Swindell	Rowing
2002	Caroline & Georgina Evers-Swindell	Rowing
2003	Silver Ferns	Netball
2004	Caroline & Georgina Evers-Swindell	Rowing
2005	George Bridgewater & Nathan Twaddle	Rowing
2006	All Blacks	Rugby
2007	Men's coxless four	Rowing
2008	Caroline & Georgina Evers-Swindell	Rowing
2009	Hamish Bond & Eric Murray	Rowing
2010	All Whites	Football
2011	All Blacks	Rugby
2012	Hamish Bond & Eric Murray	Rowing
2013	All Blacks	Rugby
2014	Hamish Bond & Eric Murray	Rowing
2015	All Blacks	Rugby
2016	Peter Burling & Blair Tuke	Sailing
2017	Team New Zealand	Yachting
2018	Black Ferns Sevens	Rugby
2019	Silver Ferns	Netball
2020	not awarded (COVID-19 pandemic)	
2021	Black Caps	Cricket
2022	Black Ferns	Rugby
2023	Black Ferns Sevens	Rugby
2024	Women's K4 sprint kayak	Canoe racing
2025	Black Ferns Sevens	Rugby

=== Para Athlete or Team of the Year ===
Year	Name	Sport
2011	Sophie Pascoe	Swimming
2012	Sophie Pascoe	Swimming
2013	Sophie Pascoe	Swimming
2014	Mary Fisher	Swimming
2015	Sophie Pascoe	Swimming
2016	Liam Malone	Athletics
2017	Sophie Pascoe	Swimming
2018	Adam Hall	Alpine skiing
2019	Sophie Pascoe	Swimming
2020	not awarded (COVID-19 pandemic)	
2021	Sophie Pascoe	Swimming
2022	Corey Peters	Skiing
2023	Cameron Leslie	Swimming and wheelchair rugby
2024	Anna Grimaldi	Athletics
2025	Danielle Aitchison	Athletics

=== Coach of the Year ===
Year	Name	Sport
1987	Brian Lochore	Rugby
1988	Lois Muir	Netball
1989	Lyn Parker	Netball
1990	Ron Cheatley	Cycling
1991	Graham Lowe	Rugby league
1992	Duncan Laing	Swimming
1993	Grant Clements	Golf
1994	not awarded	
1995	not awarded	
1996	Duncan Laing	Swimming
1997	Les Mills	Athletics
1998	Ron Cheatley	Cycling
1999	Dick Tonks	Rowing
2000	Don Tricker	Softball
2001	Tab Baldwin	Basketball
2002	Tab Baldwin	Basketball
2003	Ruth Aitken	Netball
2004	Dick Tonks	Rowing
2005	Dick Tonks	Rowing
2006	Graham Henry	Rugby
2007	Kirsten Hellier	Athletics
2008	Kirsten Hellier	Athletics
2009	Dick Tonks	Rowing
2010	Ricki Herbert	Football
2011	Graham Henry	Rugby
2012	Dick Tonks	Rowing
2013	Steve Hansen	Rugby
2014	Anthony Peden	Cycling
2015	Steve Hansen	Rugby
2016	Gordon Walker	Canoeing
2017	Gordon Walker	Canoeing
2018	Gordon Walker	Canoeing
2019	Noeline Taurua	Netball
2020	not awarded (COVID-19 pandemic)	
2021	Gordon Walker	Canoeing
2022	Wayne Smith	Rugby
2023	Gordon Walker	Canoeing
2024	Gordon Walker	Canoeing
2025	James Sandilands	Athletics

=== Emerging Talent Award ===
Year	Name	Sport
2006	Rebecca Spence	Duathlon & cycling
2007	Emma Twigg	Rowing
2008	Jossi Wells	Skiing
2009	Sam Webster	Cycling
2010	Gareth Kean	Swimming
2011	Jacko Gill	Athletics
2012	Lydia Ko	Golf
2013	Gabrielle Fa'amausili	Swimming
2014	Regan Gough	Cycling
2015	Eliza McCartney	Athletics
2016	Campbell Stewart	Cycling
2017	Ellesse Andrews	Cycling
2018	Maddi Wesche	Athletics
2019	Alice Robinson	Alpine skiing
2020	not awarded (COVID-19 pandemic)	
2021	Erika Fairweather	Swimming
2022	Gustav Legnavsky	Freeskiing
2023	Julian David	Sport climbing
2024	Tyler Bindon	Football
2025	Sam Ruthe	Athletics

=== Favourite Sporting Moment ===
The Favourite Sporting Moment is decided by a public vote, unlike the other awards which are decided by a judging panel.

Year	Event
2011	Full-time whistle of the 2011 Rugby World Cup final; New Zealand All Blacks winning 8–7 over France
2012	Nathan Cohen and Joseph Sullivan in the men's double sculls win New Zealand's first gold medal of the 2012 Summer Olympics
2013	The Black Sox winning the Softball World Championship
2014	Brendon McCullum scores a record 302 runs in the second test match against India
2015	Grant Elliott hits a six off the second-to-last ball to put the Black Caps into the 2015 Cricket World Cup final
2016	Eliza McCartney equals her national record to win the bronze medal in the Olympic women's pole vault.
2017	Mitch Hunt drops a stunning last minute drop goal securing the win for the Crusaders during the Super Rugby season.
2018	Anna Leat scores the final goal in the penalty shootout against Japan at the 2018 FIFA U-17 Women's World Cup
2019	Silver Ferns win the 2019 Netball World Cup against Australia
2020	not awarded (COVID-19 pandemic)
2021	Emma Twigg’s Olympic gold win in the single sculls
2022	Black Ferns win the final lineout of the game against the throw, 5 metres from their try-line, winning the World Cup
2023	New Zealand Warriors claim a remarkable 32–30 victory over the Sharks having trailed 2–0 just 18 minutes into the game
2024	Finn Butcher pays tribute to his father, multisporter Dale, after winning gold in canoe slalom's Olympic debut
2025	Eroni Clarke secretly sang the national anthem at Eden Park, moving son Caleb to tears before he scored the opening try

== Category finalists and winners ==
Category winners are in bold

=== 2020s ===
==== 2025 ====
The finalists were announced on 18 December 2025, except for the favourite sporting moment, for which the finalists were announced on 20 January 2026. The winners were announced on 16 February 2026.

**Supreme Award**	**Hamish Kerr** (athletics)
**Sportsman of the Year**	Geordie Beamish (athletics); Ryan Fox (golf); Luca Harrington (freestyle skiing); **Hamish Kerr** (athletics); Chris Wood (football)
**Sportswoman of the Year**	Niamh Fisher-Black (cycling); Sammie Maxwell (mountain biking); Jorja Miller (rugby union); Alice Robinson (alpine skiing); Erin Routliffe (tennis); **Zoi Sadowski-Synnott** (snowboarding)
**Para Athlete or Team of the Year**	Lisa Adams (athletics); **Danielle Aitchison** (athletics); Devon Briggs (cycling); Cameron Leslie (swimming); Nicole Murray (cycling)
**Team of the Year**	Auckland FC (football); **Black Ferns Sevens** (rugby sevens); Black Sox (softball); Kiwis (rugby league); Men's team pursuit: Nick Kergozou, Tom Sexton, Keegan Hornblow and Marshall Erwood (cycling); Ben Taylor and Oliver Welch (rowing)
**Coach of the Year**	Brendon Cameron (Para cycling); Hamish McDougall (freestyle skiing); Mike Rodger (rowing); **James Sandilands** (athletics); Cory Sweeney (rugby sevens)
**Emerging Talent Award**	Lily Greenough (BMX); Finley Melville Ives (freestyle skiing); Zoe Pedersen (swimming and surf lifesaving); **Sam Ruthe** (athletics); Braxton Sorensen-McGee (rugby union)
**Lifetime Achievement Award**	
**Leadership Award**	**Katie Sadleir**
**Favourite Sporting Moment** (public vote)	Sam Ruthe becomes the youngest person in history to break the four-minute-mile barrier (athletics); Luke Harrold lands world's first triple corked rotation in a freeski halfpipe competition (snow sports); Auckland FC lifts the premiership plate in their inaugural season, completing a remarkable first-year campaign (football); Ryan Fox chips sensational playoff birdie to claim maiden PGA Tour victory at Myrtle Beach Classic (golf); Ardie Savea's match-sealing turnover in the final moments hands Moana Pasifika their historic first-ever win over the Blues (rugby union); Hayden Wilde stages a stunning comeback at the T100 London, overcoming an injury to chase down Rico Bogen on the bike for the win (triathlon); Portia Woodman-Wickliffe becomes New Zealand's all-time top try scorer (rugby); After being tripped and stepped on in qualifying, Geordie Beamish makes the final and won gold just two days later (athletics); Hamish Kerr wins elusive world title (athletics); **Eroni Clarke secretly sings the national anthem at Eden Park, moving son Caleb to tears before he scored the opening try** (rugby union); Matthew Payne conquers Mount Panorama in torrential rain to claim epic 2025 Bathurst 1000 victory (motorsport)

==== 2024 ====
The finalists were announced on 19 December 2024, except for the favourite sporting moment, for which the finalists were announced on 17 January 2025. The winners were announced on 18 February 2025.

**Supreme Award**	**Lydia Ko** (golf)
**Sportsman of the Year**	Finn Butcher (canoe slalom); **Hamish Kerr** (athletics); James McDonald (horse racing); Hayden Wilde (triathlon); Chris Wood (football)
**Sportswoman of the Year**	Ellesse Andrews (cycling); Lisa Carrington (canoe racing); Amelia Kerr (cricket); **Lydia Ko** (golf); Erin Routliffe (tennis); Emma Twigg (rowing)
**Para Athlete or Team of the Year**	**Anna Grimaldi** (athletics); Holly Robinson (athletics); Anna Taylor (cycling); Nicole Murray (cycling); William Stedman (athletics)
**Team of the Year**	Black Ferns Sevens (rugby sevens); Lucy Spoors and Brooke Francis (rowing); Team New Zealand (sailing); White Ferns (cricket); Women's K2 sprint kayak (canoe racing); **Women's K4 sprint kayak** (canoe racing)
**Coach of the Year**	Jon Andrews (cycling); Nils Coberger (snow sports); James Coote (rowing); Ray Davies (sailing); Michael Jacobs (Para athletics); Andrew McFadzean (canoe polo); Aaron Osborne (canoe slalom); James Sandilands (athletics); Cory Sweeney (rugby sevens); **Gordon Walker** (canoe racing); Damian Wiseman (Para cycling)
**Emerging Talent Award**	**Tyler Bindon** (football); Cormac Buchanan (motorcycling); Luke Harrold (snow sports); Ethan Olivier (athletics); Levi Townley (motocross); Erice van Leuven (mountain biking)
**Lifetime Achievement Award**	
**Leadership Award**	**Marcus Daniell**
**Favourite Sporting Moment** (public vote)	Anna Grimaldi overcomes the heartbreak of missing a long jump medal to claim New Zealand's only gold at the Paris Paralympics, winning the 200 metres T47; Black Caps become the first team in history to sweep a three-match test series away to India; Brooke Francis and Lucy Spoors, in an emotional post-race moment, embrace their children after earning Olympic gold in the women's double sculls; Ellesse Andrews celebrates winning the Olympic keirin with father and coach Jon: "Most of the time your parents are on the other side of the fence, so to have one trackside on this side of the fence with me is very special"; **Finn Butcher pays tribute to his father, multisporter Dale, after winning gold in canoe slalom's Olympic debut**; Hamish Kerr memorably celebrates after clearing the winning jump in a dramatic Olympic high jump final, running through the infield amid ongoing events; Hayden Wilde marks his Olympic silver medal with a powerful display of sportsmanship, embracing rival Alex Yee in a quiet moment of camaraderie; Lydia Ko wins a career-defining gold in Paris, completing her historic Olympic medal collection; Silver Ferns clinch the 2024 Constellation Cup with a third straight comprehensive win over Australia in Perth; White Ferns defeat South Africa in the Women's T20 World Cup final in Dubai, clinching New Zealand's first T20 World Cup

==== 2023 ====
The finalists were announced on 10 January 2024, except for the favourite sporting moment, for which the finalists were announced six days later. The winners were announced on 14 February 2024.

**Supreme Award**	**Lisa Carrington** (canoe racing)
**Sportsman of the Year**	**Aaron Gate** (cycling); Ardie Savea (rugby union); Paul Coll (squash); Ryan Fox (golf); Shane van Gisbergen (motorsport)
**Sportswoman of the Year**	Courtney Duncan (motocross); Ellesse Andrews (cycling); Erika Fairweather (swimming); **Lisa Carrington** (canoe racing); Zoi Sadowski-Synnott (snowboarding)
**Para Athlete or Team of the Year**	Anna Taylor (cyclist) (cycling); **Cameron Leslie** (swimming and wheelchair rugby); Danielle Aitchison (athletics); Lisa Adams (athletics); Nicole Murray (cycling)
**Team of the Year**	**Black Ferns Sevens** (rugby sevens); All Blacks (rugby union); All Black Sevens (rugby sevens); New Zealand Warriors (rugby league); Women's K4 500m (canoe racing)
**Coach of the Year**	Cory Sweeney (rugby sevens); **Gordon Walker** (canoe racing); Sean Thompson (snowboarding); Ian Foster (rugby union); Lars Humer (swimming)
**Emerging Talent Award**	Erice Van Leuven (mountain biking); **Julian David** (sport climbing); Lucia Georgalli (snow sports); Milly Clegg (football); Tara Vaughan (canoe racing)
**Lifetime Achievement Award**	
**Leadership Award**	**Wayne Smith**
**Favourite Sporting Moment** (public vote)	Black Caps beat England by one run, just the second time in history a test match has been won by that margin, and the fourth time a side has won after following on; **New Zealand Warriors claim a remarkable 32–30 victory over the Sharks having trailed 2–0 just 18 minutes into the game**; Shane van Gisbergen wins his debut NASCAR race in Chicago, the first time a driver to have achieved that feat in over 60 years; Hannah Wilkinson scores the only goal in the opening game of the FIFA Women's World Cup against Norway; Mea Motu defends IBO world super bantamweight title after dislocating her shoulder in the first round; Women's K4 500m become the first K4 crew from New Zealand—male or female—to win a K4 world championship title; Ryan Fox wins the BMW PGA Championship; Liam Lawson earns his first Formula One points, placing ninth at the Singapore Grand Prix; Sam Whitelock wins a turnover in the final moment of the game to secure an All Blacks victory in their Rugby World Cup quarterfinal against Ireland; Ronaldo Mulitalo starts and finishes a sensational length-of-the-field move by the Kiwis in the 14th minute against the Kangaroos

==== 2022 ====
The finalists were announced on 11 January 2023, except for the favourite sporting moment, for which the finalists were announced six days later. The winners were announced on 15 February 2023.

**Supreme Award**	**Zoi Sadowski-Synnott** (snowboarding)
**Sportsman of the Year**	Aaron Gate (cycling); Dylan Schmidt (trampoline); **Nico Porteous** (freeskiing); Paul Coll (squash); Shane van Gisbergen (motorsport)
**Sportswoman of the Year**	Ellesse Andrews (cycling); Lisa Carrington (canoe racing); Lydia Ko (golf); Ruahei Demant (rugby union); **Zoi Sadowski-Synnott** (snowboarding)
**Para Athlete or Team of the Year**	Adam Hall (skiing); Cameron Leslie (swimming); **Corey Peters** (skiing); Nicole Murray (cycling); Sophie Pascoe (swimming)
**Team of the Year**	**Black Ferns** (rugby union); Joelle King and Amanda Landers-Murphy (squash); Joelle King and Paul Coll (squash); Kerri Williams and Grace Prendergast (rowing); New Zealand Eventing Team (equestrian)
**Coach of the Year**	Craig Palmer (cycling); Gordon Walker (canoe racing); Sean Thompson (snowboarding); Tommy Pyatt (freeskiing); **Wayne Smith** (rugby union)
**Emerging Talent Award**	Cameron Gray (swimming); **Gustav Legnavsky** (freeski halfpipe); Jenna Hastings (cycling); Joshua Willmer (swimming); Tara Vaughan (canoe racing)
**Lifetime Achievement Award**	
**Leadership Award**	**Sarah Hirini**
**Favourite Sporting Moment** (public vote)	Ajaz Patel becomes third bowler in test cricket history to take all 10 wickets in an innings; Corey Peters wins his second medal of the Beijing Winter Paralympics in less than 24 hours – a silver in the super G event; Aaron Gate after winning his third gold medal at the Commonwealth Games, son Axel joined Aaron for a victory lap on the winning bike; Imogen Ayris claims bronze at the Commonwealth Games in the women’s pole vault all while having a fractured foot; Sam Tanner after finishing 6th in the Commonwealth Games men's 1500m final, Sam declared himself the “happiest 6th place getter ever”; Paul Coll and Joelle King celebrating their doubles win Coll gave King a celebratory hug and in doing so their eye protection visors clashed giving King a black eye; Shane van Gisbergen wins the 2022 Bathurst 1000; Ryan Fox wins the Alfred Dunhill Links Championship by one shot; **Black Ferns win the final lineout of the game against the throw, 5 metres from their try-line, winning the World Cup**; Ruby Tui sing-along with the crowd after winning the Rugby World Cup 2022

==== 2021 ====
The finalists were announced on 12 January 2022, except for the favourite sporting moment, for which the finalists were announced two days later, and cover achievements in both 2020 and 2021. The winners were announced on 23 February 2022.

**Supreme Award**	**Lisa Carrington** (canoe racing)
**Sportsman of the Year**	Hamish Bond (rowing); Paul Coll (squash); Scott Dixon (motorsport); **Kane Williamson** (cricket)
**Sportswoman of the Year**	**Lisa Carrington** (canoe racing); Courtney Duncan (motocross); Sarah Hirini (sevens); Lydia Ko (golf); Emma Twigg (rowing)
**Para Athlete or Team of the Year**	Lisa Adams (athletics); Anna Grimaldi (athletics); Tupou Neiufi (swimming); **Sophie Pascoe** (swimming); Holly Robinson (athletics)
**Team of the Year**	**Black Caps** (cricket); Team New Zealand (sailing); Men's eight (rowing); Kerri Gowler and Grace Prendergast (rowing)
**Coach of the Year**	Allan Bunting and Cory Sweeney (sevens); Gary Stead (cricket); Tony O'Connor (rowing); **Gordon Walker** (canoe racing)
**Emerging Talent Award**	Connor Bell (athletics); Cool Wakushima (snowboarding); **Erika Fairweather** (swimming); Grace Nweke (netball); Marko Stamenić (football)
**Lifetime Achievement Award**	
**Leadership Award**	**Kereyn Smith**
**Favourite Sporting Moment** (public vote)	Zoi Sadowski-Synnott and Nico Porteous win gold on the same day at the FIS World Championships in Aspen; Team New Zealand's dramatic race eight of the 36th America’s Cup final to beat Luna Rossa; Ross Taylor hits the winning runs to secure the inaugural ICC World Test Cricket Championship for New Zealand; Rowing men’s eight win gold at the Tokyo Olympics; Black Ferns Sevens win gold at the Tokyo Olympics; **Emma Twigg wins gold in the women’s Olympic single sculls at Tokyo on her fourth attempt**; Hayden Wilde wins bronze and gives an emotional interview to kick off the New Zealand Olympic medal run at the Tokyo Olympics; Ruby Tui gives an entertaining post-match interview seen around the world, following the Black Ferns Sevens’ win against ROC; Dylan Schmidt wins bronze to claim New Zealand’s first ever gymnastics medal at the Tokyo Olympics; Lisa Carrington paddles to victory at Tokyo in the K1 500m to become the country's most successful Olympian

==== 2020 ====
The 2020 awards were deferred because of the COVID-19 pandemic, with performances during 2020 eligible for inclusion in the 2021 Halberg Awards.

=== 2010s ===
The winners for the decade awards were announced on 24 March 2021.

**Decade Champion**	Hamish Bond and Eric Murray (rowing)
**Sportsman of the Decade**	Richie McCaw (rugby)
**Sportswoman of the Decade**	Lisa Carrington (canoe racing)
**Para Athlete of the Decade**	Sophie Pascoe (Para swimming)
**Team of the Decade**	Hamish Bond and Eric Murray (rowing)
**Coach of the Decade**	Gordon Walker (canoe racing)
**Emerging Talent Athlete of the Decade**	Lydia Ko (golf)
**Leadership Award**	Johanna Wood (football)
**Favourite Sporting Moment of the Decade** (public vote)	Nathan Cohen and Joseph Sullivan in the men's double sculls win New Zealand's first gold medal of the 2012 Summer Olympics

==== 2019 ====
The finalists were announced on 14 January 2020 except for the favourite sporting moment, which was announced on 16 January. The awards ceremony was held on 13 February at the Spark Arena in Auckland.

**Supreme Award**	**Silver Ferns (netball)**
**Sportsman of the Year**	**Israel Adesanya (mixed martial arts)**; Tom Walsh (athletics); Scott McLaughlin (motorsport); Kane Williamson (cricket)
**Sportswoman of the Year**	**Lisa Carrington** (canoe racing); Courtney Duncan (motocross); Laura Langman (netball); Zoi Sadowski-Synnott (snowboarding)
**Para Athlete or Team of the Year**	**Sophie Pascoe (swimming)**; Lisa Adams (athletics); Emma Foy and Hannah van Kampen (cycling); Cameron Leslie (swimming, wheelchair rugby)
**Team of the Year**	**Silver Ferns (netball)**; Black Ferns Sevens (rugby union); Women's eight (rowing); Brooke Donoghue and Olivia Loe (rowing)
**Coach of the Year**	**Noeline Taurua (netball)**; Eugene Bareman (mixed martial arts); Roly Crichton (swimming); Gary Hay (rowing); Gordon Walker (canoe racing)
**Emerging Talent Award**	**Alice Robinson (ski racing)**; Erika Fairweather (swimming); Seb Menzies and Blake McGlashan (yachting); Laurence Pithie (cycling)
**Lifetime Achievement Award**	**Yvonne Willering (netball)**
**Leadership Award**	**Noeline Taurua**
**Favourite Sporting Moment** (public vote)	Zoi Sadowski-Synnott wins New Zealand's first ever snowboard FIS World Championships gold medal Lisa Adams breaks world record to win shot put gold at World Para Athletics Championships; **Silver Ferns winning Netball World Cup**; Martin Guptill throw to run out M.S Dhoni to get New Zealand into the Cricket World Cup final The Blackcaps super over against England in the Cricket World Cup final Women's eight winning gold at the World Rowing Championships; Israel Adesanya winning UFC middleweight title Scott McLaughlin winning Bathurst; Alice Robinson winning World Cup season opening giant slalom race TJ Perenara try against Namibia in Rugby World Cup

==== 2018 ====
The finalists were announced on 10 January 2019, with the awards ceremony being held on 21 February.

**Supreme Award**	**Tom Walsh (athletics)**
**Sportsman of the Year**	**Tom Walsh (athletics)**; Scott Dixon (motorsport); Scott McLaughlin (motorsport); Nico Porteous (freeskiing)
**Sportswoman of the Year**	**Lisa Carrington** (canoe racing); Joelle King (squash); Jonelle Price (equestrian); Zoi Sadowski-Synnott (snowboarding)
**Para Athlete or Team of the Year**	**Adam Hall (alpine skiing)**; Scott Martlew (canoe racing); Sophie Pascoe (swimming); Corey Peters (alpine skiing)
**Team of the Year**	**Black Ferns Sevens (rugby union)**; All Blacks Sevens (rugby union); Black Sticks Women (hockey); Women's under-17 football team (football); Women's kayaking team (canoe racing)
**Coach of the Year**	Leon Birnie (football); Allan Bunting (rugby union); Clark Laidlaw (rugby union); Joe Schmidt (rugby union); **Gordon Walker (canoe racing)**
**Emerging Talent Award**	**Maddi Wesche (athletics)**; Josh Armit (yachting); Lewis Clareburt (swimming); Amelia Kerr (cricket); Anna Leat (football)
**Lifetime Achievement Award**	**Barry Hunt (athletics)**
**Leadership Award**	**Farah Palmer**
**Favourite Sporting Moment** (public vote)	Nico Porteous and Zoi Sadowski-Synnott medal at the Winter Olympic Games within two hours of each other David Liti breaks a Commonwealth record and wins gold in the men's 105 kg+ weightlifting division at the Commonwealth Games; Kelly Brazier scoring a long range solo try in extra time to secure gold for the Black Ferns Sevens against Australia at the Commonwealth Games; Black Sticks Women's penalty shoot-out win over Olympic champions England in the semi-final at the Commonwealth Games; Amelia Kerr blasts a record-breaking 232 not out against Ireland for the White Ferns, achieving the highest score in women's ODIs; Roger Tuivasa-Sheck receiving an impromptu haka after winning the Dally M Player of the Year; Auckland Rugby win the Mitre 10 Cup Premiership final after a dramatic finish in extra time against Canterbury; Black Caps win the first test against Pakistan by four runs **Anna Leat's successful penalty shootout against Japan, leading New Zealand into the semifinal of the FIFA Under-17 Women's World Cup**

==== 2017 ====
The finalists were announced on 11 January 2018, with the awards ceremony being held on 8 February.

**Supreme Award**	**Emirates Team New Zealand (yachting)**
**Sportsman of the Year**	Beauden Barrett (rugby union); Brendon Hartley (motorsport); Ross Taylor (cricket); **Tom Walsh (athletics)**
**Sportswoman of the Year**	**Lisa Carrington (canoe racing)**; Sarah Goss (rugby union); Lydia Ko (golf); Portia Woodman (rugby union)
**Disabled Sportsperson of the Year**	Corey Peters (alpine skiing); Holly Robinson (athletics); **Sophie Pascoe (swimming)**; William Stedman (athletics)
**Team of the Year**	Black Ferns (rugby union); Black Sox (softball); **Emirates Team New Zealand (yachting)**; Women's K2 – Lisa Carrington & Caitlin Ryan (canoe racing).
**Coach of the Year**	Gary Hay (rowing); Glenn Moore (rugby union); **Gordon Walker (canoe racing)**; Mark Sorenson (softball)
**Emerging Talent Award**	**Ellesse Andrews (cycling)**; Josh Armit (yachting), Matt Macdonald (rowing); Nico Porteous (freestyle skiing)
**Lifetime Achievement Award**	**Morrie Chandler (motorsport)**
**Leadership Award**	**Steve Hansen**
**Favourite Sporting Moment** (public vote)	Martin Guptill smashes 11 sixes to give the Black Caps a seven-wicket ODI win. **Mitchell Hunt drops a stunning last minute drop goal securing the win for the Crusaders during the Super Rugby season.** Michael Venus wins the French Open men's doubles final to become the first New Zealand male Grand Slam champion since 1974. Black Ferns Sevens win the World Rugby Women's Sevens Series. Emirates Team New Zealand win the America's Cup. Brendon Hartley and Earl Bamber win the Le Mans 24-hour race. Black Sox win the World Softball Championships title for the seventh time. Tom Walsh wins the shot put gold medal to become the first New Zealand male to win an IAAF track and field championship. Black Ferns win the Women's Rugby World Cup for the fifth time. Lisa Carrington wins the K1 200m gold medal for the fifth time at the World Canoe Sprint Championships. Ross Taylor achieves a record equalling 17 test centuries with the Blackcaps in the second test against the West Indies.

==== 2016 ====
The finalists were announced on 11 January 2017 and the awards ceremony was held on 9 February.

**Supreme Award**	**Lisa Carrington (canoeing)**
**Sportsman of the Year**	Joseph Parker (boxing); **Mahé Drysdale (rowing)**; Nick Willis (athletics); Tom Walsh (athletics)
**Sportswoman of the Year**	**Lisa Carrington (canoeing)**; Luuka Jones (canoeing); Lydia Ko (golf); Valerie Adams (athletics)
**Disabled Sportsperson of the Year**	Anna Grimaldi (athletics); Mary Fisher (swimming); **Liam Malone (athletics)**; Sophie Pascoe (swimming)
**Team of the Year**	Women's 470 class – Jo Aleh & Polly Powrie (sailing); Men's pair – Hamish Bond & Eric Murray (rowing); **Men's 49er class – Peter Burling & Blair Tuke (sailing)**; Men's team sprint – Eddie Dawkins, Ethan Mitchell & Sam Webster (cycling)
**Coach of the Year**	Steve Hansen (rugby union); Jeremy McColl (athletics); **Gordon Walker (canoeing)**; Hamish Willcox (sailing)
**Emerging Talent Award**	Finn Bilous (snow sports); Dylan Schmidt (trampoline); **Campbell Stewart (cycling)**; Maynard Peel (cycling BMX)
**Lifetime Achievement Award**	**Myra Larcombe (swimming)**
**Leadership Award**	**Sophie Pascoe**
**Favourite Sporting Moment** (public vote)	Brendon McCullum scores a world record century in 54 balls during his final test for the Black Caps; Luuka Jones wins the New Zealand's first ever canoe slalom medal, with a silver in the women's K-1; Mahé Drysdale defends his single sculls Olympic gold medal in a photo finish; Lisa Carrington becomes the first New Zealand female to win two medals at the same Olympic Games; **Eliza McCartney winning the bronze medal in the Olympic women's pole vault**; Nikki Hamblin and American Abbey D'Agostino helping each other to their feet mid-race in the Olympic women's 5000 metres heat; Liam Malone wins two golds and a silver in the men's T43/44 sprint event at his first Paralympic Games; All Blacks set a new record of 18 consecutive test wins; Shane van Gisbergen becomes the first New Zealander in 25 years to win the V8 Supercars championship; Joseph Parker claims the WBO World Heavyweight Championship Belt.

==== 2015 ====
The finalists for the 2015 awards were announced on 14 January 2016, and the awards ceremony was held on 18 February.

Supreme Award	**All Blacks (rugby union)**
Sportsman of the Year	Dan Carter (rugby union); Scott Dixon (motorsport); Danny Lee (golf); **Kane Williamson (cricket)**
Sportswoman of the Year	Lauren Boyle (swimming); Lisa Carrington (canoeing); **Lydia Ko (golf)**; Linda Villumsen (cycling)
Disabled Sportsperson of the Year	Nikita Howarth (swimming); Michael Johnson (shooting); **Sophie Pascoe (swimming)**; Corey Peters (skiing)
Team of the Year	**All Blacks (rugby union)**; Black Caps (cricket); Men's pair – Hamish Bond & Eric Murray (rowing); Men's 49er class – Peter Burling, Blair Tuke (sailing)
Coach of the Year	**Steve Hansen (rugby union)**; Mike Hesson (cricket); Gordon Walker (canoeing); Hamish Willcox (sailing)
Emerging Talent Award	**Eliza McCartney (athletics)**; Dylan Schmidt (trampoline); Campbell Stewart (cycling); Tai Wynyard (basketball)
Lifetime Achievement Award	Ashley Taylor (athletics)
Leadership Award	Brendon McCullum

==== 2014 ====
The finalists were announced on 7 January 2015. The winners were announced at the awards ceremony on 11 February 2015.

Supreme Award	**Men's pair – Hamish Bond & Eric Murray (rowing)**
Sportsman of the Year	Steven Adams (basketball); Richie McCaw (rugby union); **Brendon McCullum (cricket)**; Brodie Retallick (rugby union); Sam Webster (cycling)
Sportswoman of the Year	Valerie Adams (athletics); Lisa Carrington (canoeing); **Lydia Ko (golf)**; Emma Twigg (rowing)
Disabled Sportsperson of the Year	**Mary Fisher (swimming)**; Emma Foy and Laura Fairweather (cycling); Sophie Pascoe (swimming); Corey Peters (skiing)
Team of the Year	Auckland City FC (football); Kiwis (rugby league); **Men's pair – Hamish Bond & Eric Murray (rowing)**; Men's team sprint – Ethan Mitchell, Eddie Dawkins, Sam Webster (cycling); Men's 49er class – Peter Burling, Blair Tuke (sailing)
Coach of the Year	Steve Hansen (rugby union); Gary Hay (rowing); Stephen Kearney (rugby league); **Anthony Peden (cycling)**; Gordon Walker (canoeing)
Emerging Talent Award	Sam Gaze (mountain biking); **Regan Gough (cycling)**; Zoe McBride (rowing); Eliza McCartney (athletics)
Lifetime Achievement Award	Dawn Jones (netball)
Leadership Award	Barbara Kendall

==== 2013 ====
The winners were announced at the awards ceremony on 13 February 2014 at Vector Arena, Auckland.

Supreme Award	**Lydia Ko (golf)**
Sportsman of the Year	**Scott Dixon (motorsport)**, Aaron Gate (track cycling), Andrew Nicholson (equestrian), Kieran Read (rugby)
Sportswoman of the Year	Valerie Adams (athletics), Lauren Boyle (swimming), Lisa Carrington (canoeing), **Lydia Ko (golf)**
Disabled Sportsperson of the Year	Mary Fisher (swimming), Michael Johnson (shooting), David Monk (bowling), **Sophie Pascoe (swimming)**
Team of the Year	Jo Aleh/Polly Powrie (sailing), **All Blacks (rugby)**, Black Sox (softball), Hamish Bond/Eric Murray (rowing), Peter Burling/Blair Tuke (yachting)
Coach of the Year	Nathan Handley (yachting), **Steve Hansen (rugby)**, Eddie Kohlhase (softball), Guy Wilson (golf)
Emerging Talent Award	**Gabrielle Fa'amausili (swimming)**, Jake Lewis (motorcycling), Tom Murray (rowing), Ella Williams (surfing)
Lifetime Achievement Award	Graham Sycamore (cycling)
Leadership Award	Richie McCaw

==== 2012 ====
The finalists for the 2012 Halberg Awards were announced on 31 December 2012. The winners were announced at the awards ceremony on 14 February 2013 at Vector Arena, Auckland.

Supreme Award	**Hamish Bond/Eric Murray (rowing)**
Sportsman of the Year	**Mahé Drysdale (rowing)**, Richie McCaw (rugby), Andrew Nicholson (equestrian), Simon van Velthooven (cycling)
Sportswoman of the Year	**Valerie Adams (athletics)**, Lisa Carrington (canoeing), Lydia Ko (golf), Sarah Walker (BMX)
Disabled Sportsperson of the Year	Mary Fisher (swimming), Phillipa Gray (cycling), Cameron Leslie (swimming), **Sophie Pascoe (swimming)**
Team of the Year	Jo Aleh/Polly Powrie (sailing), All Blacks (rugby), **Hamish Bond/Eric Murray (rowing)**, Peter Burling/Blair Tuke (sailing), Nathan Cohen/Joseph Sullivan (rowing)
Coach of the Year	Calvin Ferguson (rowing), Nathan Handley (sailing), **Richard Tonks (rowing)**, Gordon Walker (canoeing)
Emerging Talent Award	Anton Cooper (mountain biking), Dylan Kennett (track cycling), **Lydia Ko (golf)**, Andrew McKenzie (sailing)
Lifetime Achievement Award	Arthur Eustace (athletics)
Leadership Award	Sir John Wells

==== 2011 ====
Supreme Award	**All Blacks (rugby)**
Sportsman of the Year	Mahé Drysdale (rowing), Jerome Kaino (rugby), **Richie McCaw (rugby)**, Mark Todd (equestrian)
Sportswoman of the Year	**Valerie Adams (athletics)**, Lisa Carrington (canoeing), Jo Edwards (bowls), Andrea Hewitt (triathlon)
Disabled Sportsperson of the Year	Michael Johnson (shooting), Jayne Parsons (cycling), **Sophie Pascoe (swimming)**, Daniel Sharp (swimming)
Team of the Year	**All Blacks (rugby)**, Men's double scull (rowing), Men's pair (rowing), Women's pair (rowing)
Coach of the Year	Dayle Cheatley (cycling), **Sir Graham Henry (rugby)**, Gordon Tietjens (rugby), Richard Tonks (rowing)
Emerging Talent Award	**Jacko Gill (athletics)**, Shaun Johnson (rugby league), Sam Meech (yachting), Byron Wells (freestyle skiing)
Lifetime Achievement Award	Bruce Cameron
Leadership Award	Sir Murray Halberg

==== 2010 ====
Supreme Award	**All Whites (football)**
Sportsman of the Year	**Richie McCaw (rugby)**, Benji Marshall (rugby league), Ryan Nelsen (football), Jossi Wells (X Games)
Sportswoman of the Year	**Valerie Adams (athletics)**, Nikki Hamblin (athletics), Joelle King (squash), Alison Shanks (cycling), Casey Williams (netball)
Team of the Year	All Blacks (rugby), **All Whites (football)**, Kiwis (rugby league), Eric Murray and Hamish Bond (rowing), Silver Ferns (netball)
Coach of the Year	Graham Henry (rugby), **Ricki Herbert (football)**, Stephen Kearney (rugby league), Gordon Tietjens (rugby)
Emerging Talent Award	**Gareth Kean (swimming)**, Jacko Gill (athletics), Julia Edward (rowing), Tyler Bleyendaal (rugby)
Leadership Award	Jock Hobbs

=== 2000s ===
**Decade Champion**	Caroline and Georgina Evers-Swindell (rowing)

==== 2009 ====
Supreme Award	Valerie Vili (athletics)
Sportsman of the Year	Scott Dixon (motor sport), **Mahé Drysdale (rowing)**, Duncan Grant (rowing), Richie McCaw (rugby union), Daniel Vettori (cricket)
Sportswoman of the Year	Sophie Pascoe (swimming), Alison Shanks (cycling), **Valerie Vili (athletics)**, Sarah Walker (BMX cycling)
Team of the Year	All Whites (football), Men's lightweight double scull (rowing), **Men's senior pair (rowing)**, Women's 420 (sailing)
Coach of the Year	Tim Carswell (cycling), Ricki Herbert (football), Kirsten Hellier (athletics), **Richard Tonks (rowing)**
Emerging Talent Award	Aaron Cruden (rugby union), Sam Meech (yachting), Robbie Manson (rowing), **Sam Webster (cycling)**
Lifetime Achievement Award	Kenny Smith
Leadership Award	John Anderson

==== 2008 ====
Supreme Award	Valerie Vili (athletics)
Sportsman of the Year	Tom Ashley (wind surfing), **Scott Dixon (motorsport)**, Hayden Roulston (cycling), Danny Lee (golf), Nick Willis (athletics)
Sportswoman of the Year	Sam Warriner (triathlon), Val Smith (bowls), **Valerie Vili (athletics)**, Sophie Pascoe (swimming)
Team of the Year	**Women's double scull (rowing)**, All Blacks (rugby union), Kiwis (rugby league), Men's Team Pursuit (cycling)
Coach of the Year	Stephen Kearney (Rugby League), Richard Tonks (rowing), Grant Beck (wind surfing), **Kirsten Hellier (athletics)**
Emerging Talent Award	Graham Oberlin-Brown (rowing), Chris Rahardja (Karate), **Jossi Wells (Skiing)**, Paige Hareb (surfing)
Lifetime Achievement Award	Ron Shakespeare
Leadership Award	Susie Simcock

==== 2007 ====
Supreme Award	Valerie Vili (athletics)
Sportsman of the Year	**Mahé Drysdale (rowing)**, Duncan Grant (rowing), Jonathan Wyatt (athletics), Brad Butterworth (yachting)
Sportswoman of the Year	Nicole Begg (in line skating), Katherine Prumm (motocross), **Valerie Vili (athletics)**, Sarah Walker (BMX class cycling)
Team of the Year	**Men's coxless four (rowing)**, Women's Double Scull (rowing), Men's Pair (rowing), Emirates Team New Zealand (yachting)
Coach of the Year	Gordon Tietjens (Rugby union), Calvin Ferguson (rowing), Chris Nilsson (rowing), **Kirsten Hellier (athletics)**
Emerging Talent Award	**Emma Twigg (rowing)**, Danny Lee (golf), Eddie Dawkins (cycling), Brendon Hartley (motor sport)
Lifetime Achievement Award	Merv Wallace
Leadership Award	John Graham

==== 2006 ====
Supreme Award	Mahé Drysdale (rowing)
Sportsman of the Year	**Mahé Drysdale (rowing)**, Moss Burmester (swimming), Kalon Dobbin(speed Skating), Richie McCaw (rugby union), Nick Willis (athletics)
Sportswoman of the Year	Farah Palmer (rugby union), Hannah McLean (swimming), **Valerie Vili (athletics)**, Sam Warriner (triathlon)
Team of the Year	**All Blacks (rugby union)**, Black Ferns (rugby union), Hamish Pepper and Carl Williams (yachting), Silver Ferns (netball)
Coach of the Year	Ruth Aitken (netball), Jan Cameron (swimming), Kirsten Hellier (athletics), **Graham Henry (rugby union)**, Richard Tonks (rowing)
Emerging Talent Award	Nathan Cohen (rowing), Graham Oberlin-Brown (rowing), Katherine Prumm (motorcycling), **Rebecca Spence (multi-sport)**
Lifetime Achievement Award	Ken Elliot (golf)
Leadership Award	Tana Umaga (rugby union)

==== 2005 ====
Supreme Award	Michael Campbell (golf)
Sportsman of the Year	Michael Campbell (golf), Daniel Carter (rugby union), Mahé Drysdale (rowing), Jonathan Wyatt (mountain running)
Sportswoman of the Year	Irene van Dyk (netball), **Kate McIlroy** (mountain running), Valarie Vili (athletics), Sam Warriner (triathlon)
Team of the Year	All Blacks (rugby union), **George Bridgewater & Nathan Twaddle (rowing men's pair)**, Caroline & Georgina Evers-Swindell (rowing women's double scull), Nicky Coles & Juliette Haigh (rowing women's pair)
Coach of the Year	Ruth Aitken (netball), Graham Henry (rugby union), Brian McClennan (rugby league), **Richard Tonks (rowing)**
Lifetime Achievement Award	Fred Strachan (rowing)
Leadership Award	Don Rowlands (rowing)

==== 2004 ====
Supreme Award	Sarah Ulmer (cycling)
Sportsman of the Year	**Hamish Carter (triathlon)**, Bevan Docherty (triathlon), Ben Fouhy (canoeing), Greg Henderson (cycling)
Sportswoman of the Year	Rachael Anderson (surf life saving), Angela McMillan (aerobics), Vanessa Quin (mountain biking), **Sarah Ulmer (cycling)**
Team of the Year	Black Sox (softball), **Caroline & Georgina Evers-Swindell (rowing)**, Sharon Sims & Jo Edwards (bowls), New Zealand Sevens (rugby union)
Coach of the Year	Brendon Cameron (cycling), Chris Pilone (triathlon), **Dick Tonks (rowing)**, Don Tricker (softball)
Lifetime Achievement Award	**Heather & Jeff Robson (tennis & badminton)**
Leadership Award	**Sir Brian Lochore (rugby union)**
