= Steve Hansen =

New Zealand rugby coach and former player

Sir Steve Hansen KNZM
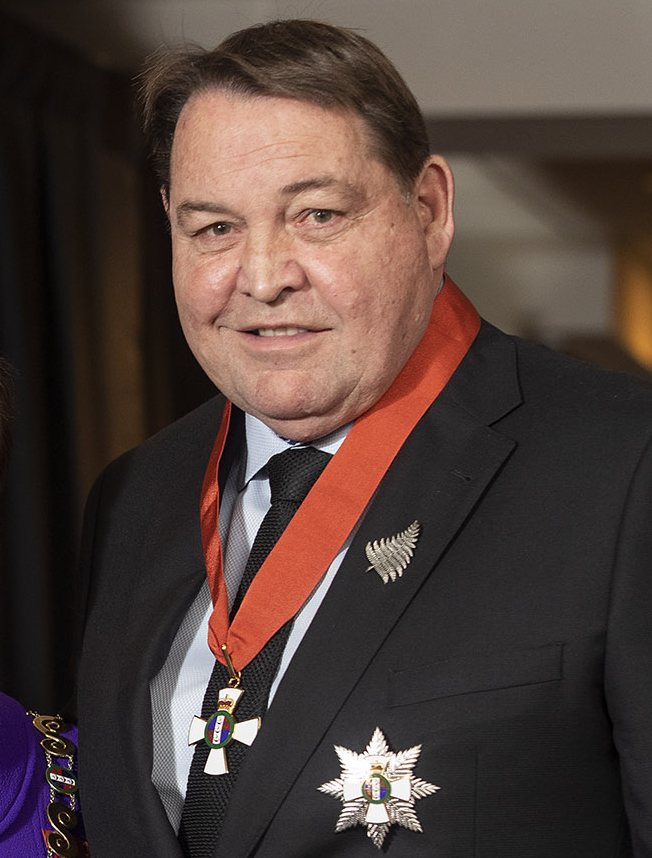
- Hansen in 2020
- Born: Stephen William Hansen; 7 May 1959 (age 67) Mosgiel, New Zealand
- School: Taieri High School; Christchurch Boys' High School

Rugby union career
- Position: Centre
Provincial / State sides
Years	Team	Apps	(Points)
1980–1987	Canterbury	21	
Coaching career
- Years: Team
- 1996–2001: Canterbury
- 1999–2001: Crusaders (assistant)
- 2002–2004: Wales
- 2004–2011: New Zealand (assistant)
- 2012–2019: New Zealand
- 2024–: Toyota Verblitz
Medal record
Men's rugby union
Representing New Zealand (as coach)
Rugby World Cup
Gold medal – first place	2015 England	Squad
Bronze medal – third place	2019 Japan	Squad

Sir Stephen William Hansen KNZM and High Chief of Vaiala, (born 7 May 1959) is a New Zealand rugby union coach and former player. He is also the father of Black Ferns coach, Whitney Hansen.

He was the head coach of the New Zealand national team, the All Blacks, from 2012 to 2019, and won the 2015 Rugby World Cup. He stepped down at the end of the 2019 Rugby World Cup.

Hansen is also part owner of 2021 Everest winning horse Nature Strip.

== Early life ==
Hansen was born in Mosgiel, to Desmond and Lauriss Hansen, who were dairy farmers on the Taieri Plain. He was educated at Outram Primary School, The Taieri High School, and Christchurch Boys' High School. Hansen also spent six years in the New Zealand Police, working at the Hornby Police Station where he met his first wife. A rugby union centre, he represented Canterbury at first-class level on 21 occasions.

== Coaching career ==
Hansen began his coaching career with the Canterbury provincial rugby union team from 1996 to 2001. During his tenure the side won the National Provincial Championship in 1997 and 2001. In 1999, 2000 and 2001, he was assistant coach to Wayne Smith and then Robbie Deans for the Canterbury Crusaders.

=== Wales ===
In 2002, Hansen was hired as the forwards coach for the Wales national team; however, following the resignation of head coach Graham Henry after a 54–10 loss to Ireland in the Six Nations in February 2002, Hansen was promoted to head coach for the remainder of the tournament. In his first game in charge, Wales performed well but lost 37–33 to France. A year later, Wales lost every match in the 2003 Six Nations Championship to win the Wooden Spoon for the first time since 1995, and went on to record a streak of 10 consecutive Test match defeats, broken by a defeat of rugby minnows Romania on 27 August 2003, though Hansen relinquished coaching duties for this game to Wales A coach Mike Ruddock. Hansen resumed charge for another victory over Scotland ahead of the 2003 Rugby World Cup, at which a strong display against New Zealand and a spirited quarter-final loss against England restored some faith in his coaching. After the World Cup, Hansen announced that he would be stepping down as Wales coach at the end of the 2004 Six Nations Championship.

=== Return to New Zealand ===
In 2004, Hansen was appointed to the All Blacks as an assistant coach under Graham Henry. Hansen was considered as a likely candidate to become the next Crusaders coach, starting in the 2009 Super 14 season, after Robbie Deans left to coach Australia, but the Crusaders coaching job went to former All Black Todd Blackadder.

==== 2011 ====
Hansen assisted Graham Henry in coaching New Zealand to a win in the World Cup final against France, ending a 24-year World Cup drought for the All Blacks. Hansen took over as head coach of the All Blacks when Graham Henry's contract expired at the end of 2011. He was formally appointed on 15 December 2011.

==== 2012 ====
In his first games as head coach, Hansen guided the All Blacks to a 3–0 series victory over Ireland during their 2012 tour, with the final game being a record 60–0 defeat for the Irish. On 25 August, the All Blacks retained the Bledisloe Cup for a tenth consecutive year after their second match against Australia during the 2012 Rugby Championship. His only defeat in 2012 came against England, a 38–21 loss on 1 December 2012.

He was named IRB Coach of the Year for 2012. In the 2012 Queen's Birthday and Diamond Jubilee Honours, Hansen was appointed a Companion of the New Zealand Order of Merit, for services to rugby.

==== 2013 ====
The All Blacks retained the Rugby Championship and Bledisloe Cup, and won 14 of 14 matches, becoming the first team to ever do this in the professional era. The team finished the year by winning 24–22 against Ireland. Hansen was named IRB coach of the year for the second year running.

==== 2014 ====
In 2014, having already defeated England 3–0 on their tour, New Zealand lost their first ever Rugby Championship match. On 4 October, they lost to South Africa 27–25 in Johannesburg, while they had also drawn their opening match of the Championship with Australia 12–all. Despite this, they retained their title for a third consecutive year. On 1 November 2014, Hansen led the All Blacks to a 74–6 win over the United States in Chicago. Hansen later led the team to a further three victories on their European tour, and was named World Rugby coach of the year.

==== 2015 ====
Hansen took the All Blacks to Samoa for the first ever official test match between the two teams in Samoa, where the All Blacks won the match 25–16. In a shortened Rugby Championship, the All Blacks failed to retain the title they held for three years. Having beaten Argentina 39–18 and South Africa 27–20, a final match against Australia would see either New Zealand or Australia claim the Championship. For the first time since 2011, Australia beat the All Blacks 27–19. During the 2015 Rugby World Cup, despite some error-ridden games in the Pool stage, Hansen led the All Blacks to the top of Pool C with victories over Argentina, 26–16, Namibia 58–14, Georgia 43–10 and Tonga 47–9, before beating France in the quarter-final 62–13 and South Africa 20–18 in the semi-final. They faced Australia in the final, winning 34–17 to become the first team ever to retain the Webb Ellis Cup. This was also the All Blacks' first ever Rugby World Cup victory outside New Zealand.

==== 2016 ====
The start of the 2016 season saw Hansen call up 7 uncapped players to the squad ahead of their 3-test series with Wales. Hansen was having to deal with the retirements of previous key players in Dan Carter, Richie McCaw, Keven Mealamu, Ma'a Nonu and Conrad Smith, with a guaranteed new mid-field trio needed to be tested. Despite the losses of the retired 5, their replacements, Sam Cane, Aaron Cruden, Ryan Crotty and Malakai Fekitoa, for the first test had already earned 96 caps between them and had been in the All Blacks environment since 2012. In the first test, Wales led the All Blacks 18–15 at the break, however the All Blacks scored 15 points in 5 minutes to lead Wales 32–21, with a final try on the 80th minute to win 39–21. The second test saw the team all tied up after 40 minutes 10–all, but 4 tries in 15 minutes saw New Zealand lead by 26 points heading into the final 10 minutes. 2 late tries by Wales in the closing period of the game saw the game end 36–22 to the All Blacks. Hansen led New Zealand a clean sweep, after New Zealand won the final test 46–6, with a new mid-field trio tested in Beauden Barrett, Ryan Crotty and George Moala. Many new players gained their first cap during the Welsh series including Eliot Dixon and Liam Squire.

On 25 July, Hansen was reappointed as the All Blacks head coach, seeing the role through to the end of the 2019 Rugby World Cup.

During the 2016 Rugby Championship, the All Blacks secured their fourth title in 5 years, becoming the first side in either Rugby Championship or Tri-Nations to secure their title four rounds in. They won all 6 games convincingly, defeating Australia 42–8 and 29–9, Argentina 57–22 and 36–17 and South Africa 41–13 and 57–15. The following Bledisloe Cup game against Australia at Eden Park, saw the All Blacks secure a 37–10 victory, and with it a new Tier One World Record of 18 consecutive victories. This run was ended by a historic first victory by Ireland 40–29, in Chicago. However, Hansen later led the All Blacks to 3 consecutive wins, defeating Italy 68–10 with a team that had over 12 changes. The All Blacks played Ireland again in their third week of the tour, this time, earning a 21–9 victory in Dublin, before going on to win 24–19 against France in Paris.

==== 2017 ====
In 2017, Hansen led the All Blacks into their first test series against the British & Irish Lions since 2005, when Hansen was assistant to Graham Henry. Ahead of the series, he led his side to a convincing 78–0 victory over Samoa in a warm-up in Auckland. The test series against the Lions was highly anticipated in New Zealand, was and expectation of a 3–0 series win for the All Blacks. This expectation looked promising in the first test, where New Zealand ran out 30–15 victors. However, the series was drawn in the second test, with a first home loss for New Zealand since 2009, Hansen's first taste of a loss at home. Center Sonny Bill Williams was shown a red card 24 minutes into the game, giving the Lions the advantage for the rest of the game, and the Lions won 24–21. The All Blacks failed to score any tries in the game, something they had not done at home since 2002. The final test saw a controversial call from referee Romain Poite just minutes from full-time, a call that could have seen the All Blacks attempt a penalty kick which could have won the game. However, a scrum was called for an accidental offside, and the game ended 15–15, the first drawn test between the two sides. The series ended in a draw for the first ever time against New Zealand.

The start of the 2017 Rugby Championship saw Hansen lead the All Blacks to a comprehensive win over Australia, 54–34 in Sydney. At one point, the All Blacks led 54–6, but conceded four tries in the last thirty minutes of the game. In the second round, New Zealand came from behind (17–0) to see out another victory over Australia 35–29. It was not until the 78th minute that the game was secure, with Australia leading 29–28 heading into the final minutes of the game. In round three, Hansen made significant changes to his team against Argentina, but New Zealand saw out the victory 39–22, even though they were behind at half time. In the fourth round, Hansen brought back his main players for their home game against South Africa. They helped New Zealand to an historic victory, beating South Africa 57–0 in what was their largest ever defeat. Leading into their fifth match, New Zealand had already secured their fifth Championship title, and wins over Argentina and South Africa away meant the All Blacks ended the Championship with six out of six wins.

New Zealand lost 23–18 loss to Australia in the third Bledisloe Cup test. This was the first loss against Australia since 2015, and the first time since 2011 that the All Blacks had lost multiple test matches. On 4 November, Hansen led an experimental, youthful and inexperienced side to a 31–22 uncapped win over the Barbarians at Twickenham. This was followed up by wins over France, 38–18, and 28–23 over a French XV. On 18 November, New Zealand were pushed by Scotland in Edinburgh, going into half time 3–all, but won 22–17. New Zealand finished their tour with a convincing 33–18 win over Wales in Cardiff.

==== 2018 ====
The start of 2018 saw France tour New Zealand for the first time since 2013. Despite a number of uncapped players in the squad, and without captain Kieran Read, Hansen led his side to a 3–0 series win and retained the Dave Gallaher Trophy for the fifth consecutive time. The series started with a convincing 52–11 win in Auckland, followed by a 26–13 win in Wellington, even with France down a man for 70 minutes after a controversial red card to fullback Benjamin Fall. The series ended in Dunedin, where the All Blacks with a much changed side from the first tests, ran out 49–14 victors.

During the 2018 Rugby Championship, Hansen led his side to a 6th Championship title, winning five games. The only loss was to South Africa in the fourth round, 34–36, which saw South Africa record their first win against New Zealand in New Zealand since their 32–29 win in 2009. New Zealand then had the third Bledisloe test against Australia where they won 37–20. They started off their end of year tour with a 69–31 win over Japan, then sneaked past England in a 16–15 win. A week later they lost 9–16 to Ireland in Dublin, Ireland's first win at home over the All Blacks in their history. New Zealand's last match of the year was against Italy, which they won convincingly 66–3.

==== 2019 ====
The start of 2019 for Hansen saw his side finish third in the Rugby Championship; the first time they have finished in that position since Argentina joined the Rugby Championship – the last being during the 2004 Tri Nations Series. The Championship saw a first draw against the Springboks since 1994, followed by a record-equalling defeat at the hands of the Wallabies, 47–26. Despite that score, New Zealand went onto secure the Bledisloe Cup after beating Australia in the return leg 36–0.

In the 2019 Rugby World Cup New Zealand topped their pool, defeating eventual champions South Africa, but were comfortably defeated in the semi-final 19-7 by England. New Zealand went on to beat Wales 40–17 in the bronze match.

==== 2023 ====
It has been revealed on social media that Hansen will be assisting Wallabies coach, Eddie Jones for only a week prior to the start of his 2023 Rugby World Cup campaign in Australia's last warm-up match against the hosts, France who is also one of the favourites to win the tournament.

== Coaching statistics ==
Team	Years	Played	Won	Drawn	Lost	Win %	For	Against
Wales	2002–2004	30	10	0	20	33.33	696	826
New Zealand	2012–2019	107	93	4	10	86.92	3,852	1,736
Total		137	103	4	30	75.18	4,548	2,562

== Honours ==
New Zealand

- Rugby World Cup
  - Winners: 2015
  - Third place: 2019
- The Rugby Championship
  - Winners: 2012, 2013, 2014, 2016, 2017, 2018
  - Runners-up: 2015
- Bledisloe Cup
  - Winners: 2012, 2013, 2014, 2015, 2016, 2017, 2018, 2019
- Dave Gallaher Trophy
  - Winners: 2013 (2x), 2016, 2017, 2018
- Freedom Cup
  - Winners: 2012, 2013, 2014, 2015, 2016, 2017, 2018, 2019
- Killik Cup
  - Winners: 2017
- Hillary Shield
  - Winners: 2013, 2014 (2x), 2018
- British & Irish Lions series
  - Winners: 2017 (drawn series – shared title)
- World Rugby Coach of the Year
  - Winner: 2012, 2013, 2014, 2016
- World Rugby Team of the Year (New Zealand)
  - Winners: 2012, 2013, 2014, 2015, 2016, 2017
- Laureus World Team of the Year (New Zealand)
  - Winners: 2016

== Other honours ==
New Zealand (as assistant coach)

- World Rugby Team of the Year (New Zealand)
  - Winners: 2005, 2006, 2008, 2010, 2011
- Rugby World Cup
  - Winners: 2011
- Tri Nations
  - Winners: 2005, 2006, 2007, 2008, 2010
  - Runners-up: 2009, 2011
- Bledisloe Cup
  - Winners: 2004, 2005, 2006, 2007, 2008, 2009, 2010, 2011
- Freedom Cup
  - Winners: 2006, 2007, 2008, 2010, 2011
- Dave Gallaher Trophy
  - Winners: 2004, 2006, 2007, 2009
- Hillary Shield
  - Winners: 2008, 2009, 2010
- British & Irish Lions series
  - Winners: 2005
- Grand Slam tour
  - Winners: 2005, 2008, 2010

Canterbury

- ITM Cup
  - Winners: 1997, 2001

Crusaders (as assistant coach)

- Super 12
  - Winners: 1999, 2000

Barbarians

- Killik Cup
  - Winners: 2013 (vs Fiji)

== See also ==
- High School Old Boys RFC

Sporting positions
Preceded by Graham Henry	All Blacks coach 2012–2019	Succeeded by Ian Foster
Awards
Preceded by Dick Tonks	New Zealand's Coach of the Year; 2013; 2015	Succeeded by Anthony Peden
Preceded by Anthony Peden	New Zealand's Coach of the Year; 2013; 2015	Succeeded by Gordon Walker
