= Hamish Bond =

New Zealand rower (born 1986)

Hamish Bond CNZM
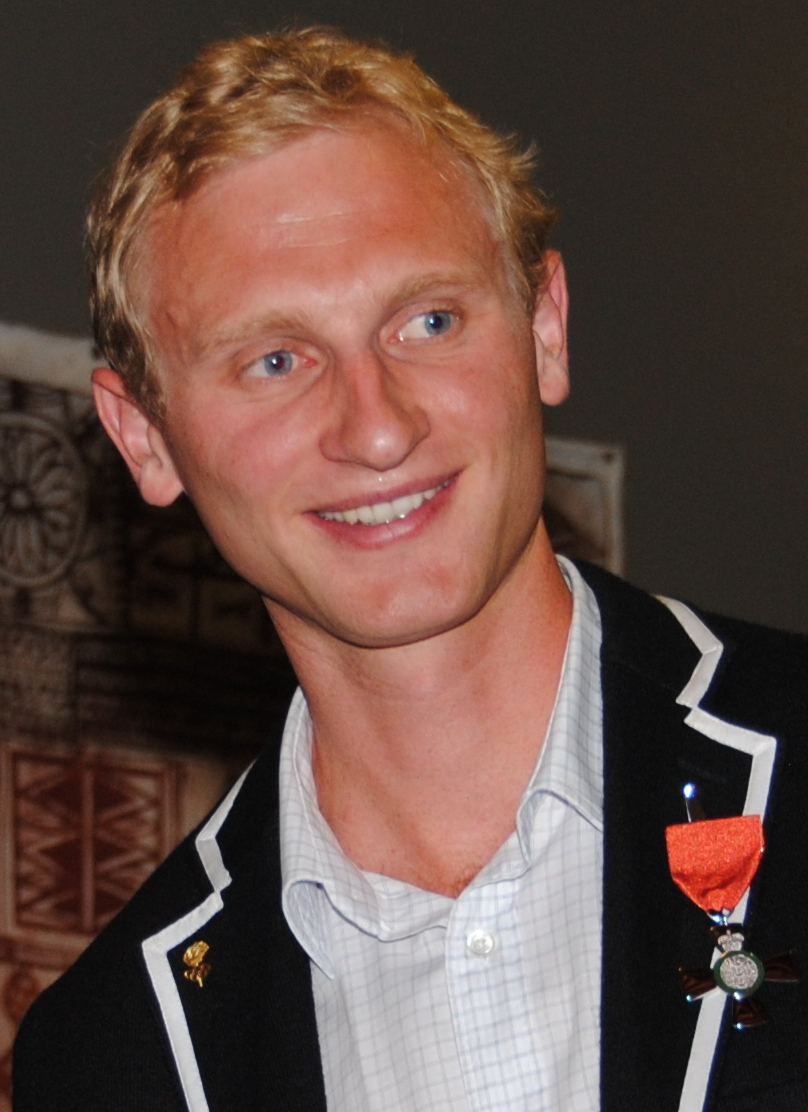
- Bond in 2013

Personal information
- Full name: Hamish Bryon Bond
- Born: 13 February 1986 (age 40) Dunedin, New Zealand
- Height: 189 cm (6 ft 2 in)
- Weight: 91 kg (201 lb)
- Spouse: Lizzie Travis (m. 2015)

Sport
- Sport: Men's rowing / road cycling
- Club: North End Rowing Club
Medal record
Representing New Zealand
Men's rowing
Olympic Games
Gold medal – first place	2012 London	Coxless pair
Gold medal – first place	2016 Rio de Janeiro	Coxless pair
Gold medal – first place	2020 Tokyo	Eight
World Championships
Gold medal – first place	2007 Munich	Coxless four
Gold medal – first place	2009 Poznan	Coxless pair
Gold medal – first place	2010 Karapiro	Coxless pair
Gold medal – first place	2011 Bled	Coxless pair
Gold medal – first place	2013 Chungjiu	Coxless pair
Gold medal – first place	2014 Amsterdam	Coxed pair
Gold medal – first place	2014 Amsterdam	Coxless pair
Gold medal – first place	2015 Aiguebelette	Coxless pair
Men's road cycling
Commonwealth Games
Bronze medal – third place	2018 Gold Coast	Time trial
Oceania Championships
Gold medal – first place	2018 Tasmania	Time trial
Bronze medal – third place	2017 Canberra	Time trial

Hamish Bryon Bond CNZM (born 13 February 1986) is a retired New Zealand rower and former road cyclist. He is a three-time Olympic gold medallist at the 2012 London Olympic Games, the 2016 Rio de Janeiro Olympic Games, and at the 2020 Tokyo Olympic Games. He won six consecutive World Rowing Championships gold medals in the coxless pair and set the current world best times in both the coxless and coxed pair. He made a successful transition from rowing to road cycling after the 2016 Summer Olympics, focussing on the road time trial and winning a medal at the Commonwealth Games. He returned to rowing for the 2020 Olympic Games in Tokyo, winning a gold medal in the men's eight. In 2024 he was a cyclor in the Team New Zealand team which successfully defended the America's Cup.

== Personal life ==
Bond was born in Dunedin. He boarded at Otago Boys' High School. He graduated in 2010 from Massey University with a Bachelor of Business Studies (major in finance) and a Graduate Diploma in Personal Financial Planning. Bond married Lizzie Travis in April 2015.

== Career ==
=== Rowing ===
Bond was a member of the New Zealand gold medal-winning coxless four at the 2007 World Rowing Championships. The coxless four won team of the year at the Halberg Sports Awards in 2007. He was a member of the men's coxless four which won the B final at the 2008 Summer Olympics.

The following year, he and Eric Murray combined to win the coxless pair at the 2009 World Rowing Championships in Poznan. After this performance Bond and Murray won the team of the year award at the 2009 New Zealand Halberg Sports Awards.

Bond and Murray continued to row together in the coxless pairs and competed at and won the World Cup Series and at the 2010 World Rowing Championships on Lake Karapiro, New Zealand 2010. They won their 2nd world title together in front of a passionate home crowd. Bond describes racing in front of a home crowd as a "once in a lifetime experience". Bond and Murray continued their undefeated streak, winning gold at the 2011 World Rowing Championships in Slovenia. Bond and Murray had a long-running rivalry from 2009 to 2011 with the British pair of Pete Reed and Andrew Triggs Hodge. The British pair won silver in 2009, 2010 and 2011.

Bond and Murray have also won the Silver Goblets & Nickalls' Challenge Cup for Men's Senior Pairs at the Henley Royal Regatta in 2009 and 2010 and then again in 2013. In 2014 he set a World Indoor Rowing Record for the 60 minute category, completing 18,443m in that time.

At the 2012 London Olympic Games Bond and Murray took six seconds off the world record of 6:08.5 in their heat for the men's coxless pair. In the Olympic final they surged into the lead after the 500 metre mark to win the gold medal in 6:16.65 by open water. France edged Great Britain for the silver in 6:21.11 v. Great Britain's time of 6:21.77. The victory capped an undefeated streak that began when Murray and Bond began racing the pair internationally in 2009.

After London, Bond and Murray decided to continue as a partnership aiming towards the 2016 Rio de Janeiro Olympic Games. They made changes to their training regime and Noel Donaldson became their coach. They continued their unbeaten run through the next 4 years winning the World Championship Coxless Pair in 2013, 2014 and 2015. In 2014 in Amsterdam they doubled up to win both the coxed and coxless pair events, setting a new World Best Time in the coxed pair of 6:33.26.

In Rio, Bond and Murray won their second consecutive Olympic gold medal, dominating the field and completing their 8-year unbeaten run together. In 2016, after returning home from Rio de Janeiro Bond and Murray wrote a book describing their journey through the years of rowing together. The book was commended for its candid and honest portrayal of their time together.

In 2018 the International Rowing Federation awarded Bond and Murray the Thomas Keller Medal for their outstanding international rowing career. It is the sport's highest honour and is awarded within five years of the athlete's retirement, acknowledging an exceptional rowing career and exemplary sportsmanship.

In 2019, Bond decided to rejoin the New Zealand rowing team, this time in the men's eight, alongside fellow double Olympic gold medallist Mahe Drysdale, aiming to compete at the Tokyo 2020 games. The eight did not initially qualify for the games, and qualified in May 2021 at the Last Chance Regatta. At the games, the eight won the gold medal.

In January 2022, Bond announced his retirement from rowing.

=== Cycling ===
Outside of rowing, Bond has always been a keen cyclist. In 2009, he raced at elite level in New Zealand alongside fellow Olympian Sam Bewley, competing in the six-day Tour of Southland for the Zookeepers-Cycle Surgery team. The team's Heath Blackgrove won the 2009 event.

In November 2016, Bond announced that he would take a break from rowing in 2017, and concentrate on cycling instead. In his first attempt at the national time trials in January 2017 he finished in third place, he then went to win a bronze medal in the Oceania Championships. Bond competed in the 2016 Tour of Southland with the Vantage Windows and Doors Team. His teammate Michael Torckler briefly led the tour after an impressive performance from Bond and Torckler on the Coronet Peak climb. Bond was selected to represent New Zealand for the 2017 World Championships, held in Norway in September 2017, where he finished in 39th in the men's time trial after suffering a puncture. On 5 January 2018 he won the elite men's time trial at the national road cycling championships in Napier, in a new course record. Off the back of this performance he was selected to represent New Zealand in road cycling at the 2018 Commonwealth Games on the Gold Coast. In March 2018, Bond won the gold medal in the elite men's time trial at the Oceania Championships.

At the end of March 2018, he set a target to win a cycling medal at the Tokyo Olympics in 2020.

On 10 April 2018, Bond won the bronze medal in the road time trial at the Commonwealth Games on the Gold Coast in Queensland, Australia.

==== Major results ====
2017
3rd Time trial, Oceania Road Championships
3rd Time trial, National Road Championships
9th Overall New Zealand Cycle Classic
2018
1st Time trial, Oceania Road Championships
1st Time trial, National Road Championships
3rd Time trial, Commonwealth Games
3rd Chrono Champenois
2019
2nd Time trial, National Road Championships
2020
1st Time trial, National Road Championships
2021
4th Time trial, National Road Championships

=== Sailing ===
In January 2023, Bond accepted the role of cyclor in Emirates Team New Zealand for the 2024 America's Cup.

== Honours and awards ==
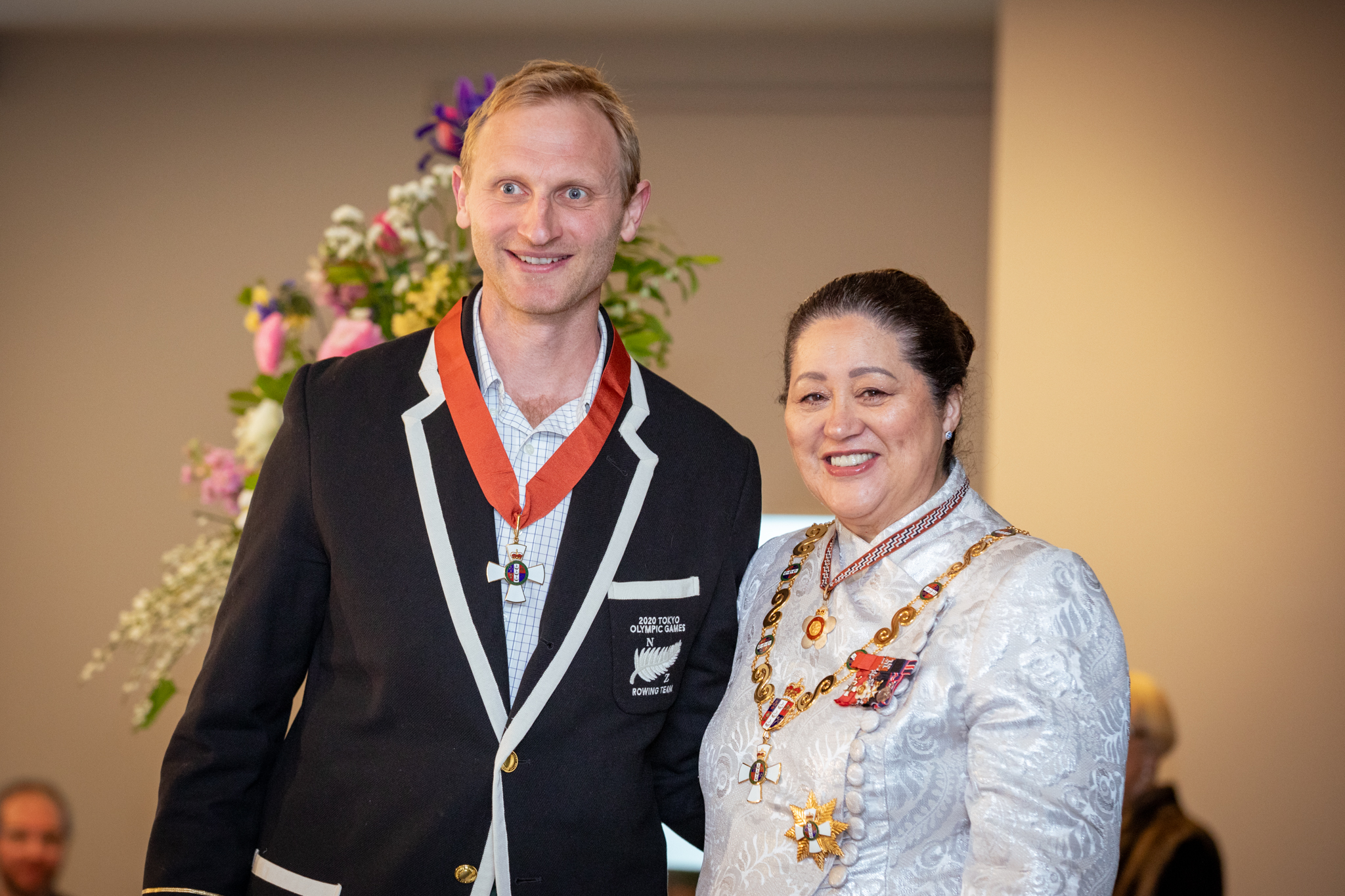
Bond (left), after his investiture as a Companion of the New Zealand Order of Merit by the governor-general, Dame Cindy Kiro, at Dunedin Town Hall on 29 October 2025

In the 2013 New Year Honours, Bond was appointed a Member of the New Zealand Order of Merit for services to rowing. In the 2023 New Year Honours, he was promoted to Companion of the New Zealand Order of Merit, also for services to rowing.

Awards
Preceded by Caroline & Georgina Evers-Swindell	New Zealand's Team of the Year; 2009; 2012; 2014; With: Eric Murray	Succeeded by All Whites
Preceded by All Blacks	New Zealand's Team of the Year; 2009; 2012; 2014; With: Eric Murray	Succeeded by All Blacks
Preceded by All Blacks	New Zealand's Team of the Year; 2009; 2012; 2014; With: Eric Murray	Succeeded by All Blacks
Preceded by All Blacks	Halberg Awards – Supreme Award; 2012; 2014; With: Eric Murray	Succeeded by Lydia Ko
Preceded by Lydia Ko	Halberg Awards – Supreme Award; 2012; 2014; With: Eric Murray	Succeeded by All Blacks
Preceded by Valerie Adams	Lonsdale Cup; 2012; With: Eric Murray	Succeeded by Valerie Adams
