= Eric Murray (rower) =

New Zealand rower (born 1982)

Eric Murray CNZM
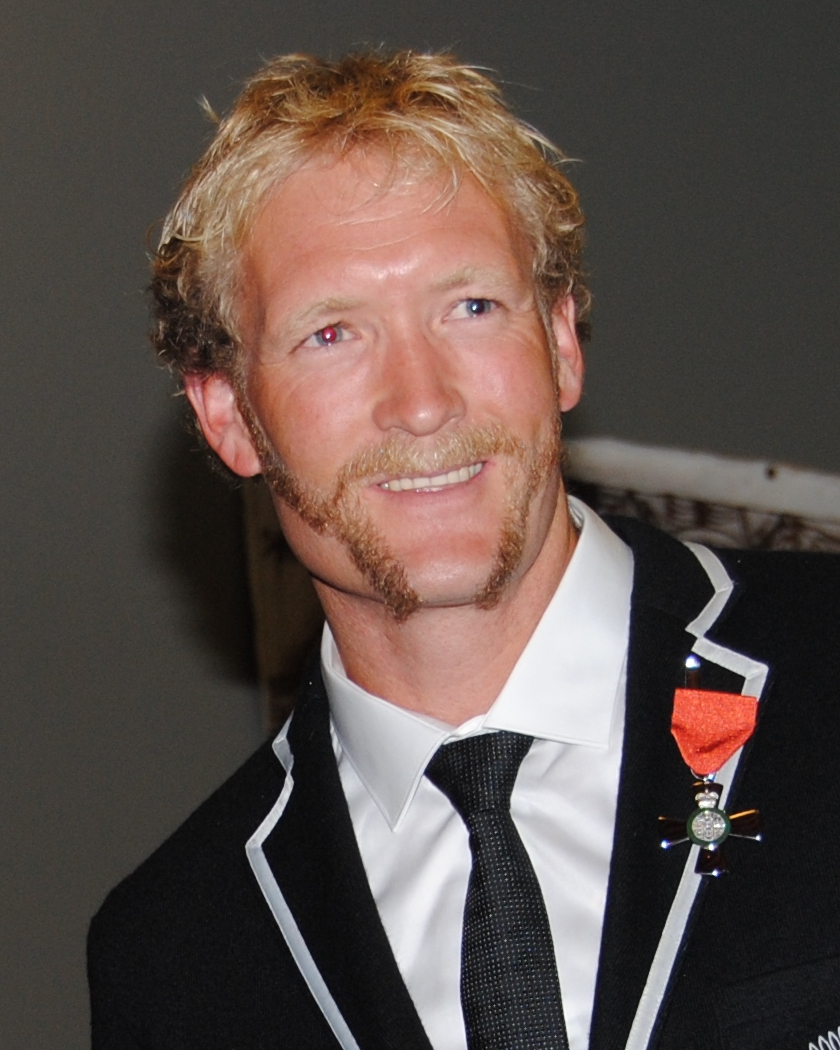
- Murray in 2013

Personal information
- Full name: Eric Gordon Murray
- Born: 6 May 1982 (age 44) Hastings, New Zealand
- Height: 196 cm (6 ft 5 in)
- Weight: 98 kg (216 lb)
Medal record
Men's rowing
Representing New Zealand
Olympic Games
Gold medal – first place	2012 London	Men's coxless pair
Gold medal – first place	2016 Rio de Janeiro	Men's coxless pair
World Championships
Gold medal – first place	2007 Munich	Men's coxless four
Gold medal – first place	2009 Poznan	Men's coxless pair
Gold medal – first place	2010 Karapiro	Men's coxless pair
Gold medal – first place	2011 Bled	Men's coxless pair
Gold medal – first place	2013 Chungjiu	Men's coxless pair
Gold medal – first place	2014 Amsterdam	Men's coxed pair
Gold medal – first place	2014 Amsterdam	Men's coxless pair
Gold medal – first place	2015 Aiguebelette	Men's coxless pair

Eric Gordon Murray CNZM (born 6 May 1982) is a retired New Zealand rower and gold medalist at the 2012 London Olympic Games, as well as at the 2016 Rio de Janeiro Olympic Games. He won six consecutive World Rowing Championship gold medals in the coxless pair plus two other gold medals in the coxless four and coxed pair. In 2012 and 2014 he set two world best times in the coxless pair and coxed pair respectively, which still stand as the world's best in those boat classes.

== Personal life ==
Murray was born in Hastings. His parents are Annette and Peter, and his older sister is Fiona. When Murray was an infant, the family moved to Manurewa. Soon after, they then bought land in Bombay, where Murray grew up and attended primary school. At school, Murray enjoyed swimming competitions and later moved to triathlons. When he grew too tall and running became uncomfortable, he gave up on that while at Pukekohe High School.

In 2006, he married Jackie Robertson, the eldest daughter of Gary Robertson. His father-in-law had been a member of the 1972 New Zealand eight that won gold at the 1972 Summer Olympics in Munich, Germany. Murray and Robertson divorced in 2019, sharing custody of their son until Robertson's death from bowel cancer in 2026.

== Career ==
At Pukekohe High School, Murray played rugby union and was looking for a summer sport to keep fit for the next season of winter rugby, so he and a friend went to the Mercer Rowing Club for an advertised open day. They had one race that year in a coxed four made up of novices, and they came last by a wide margin. His school was not one of the traditional rowing schools, but Paula Twining was in his year and enjoyed successes at New Zealand championships, which gave inspiration to other novice rowers. Murray first went to the Maadi Cup, New Zealand's premier school rowing regatta, in 1997, but did not achieve anything at Lake Karapiro. In 1998, when the regatta was held at Lake Ruataniwha, he came third in the U16 double, and second in the U16 quad. He was in his last year at high school in 1999, and at that year's Maadi Cup, he won the U-17 quad national title. After their 1999 success, their trainer—Charles Haggie—introduced them to people in the rowing scene so that they would end up with one of the dominant rowing clubs at the time after they left school: Avon Rowing Club, Auckland Rowing Club, or Waikato Rowing Club.

His first world championship medal was as a member of the New Zealand coxless four at 2007 World Rowing Championships. Murray then went on to become a member of the seven-time World Champion coxless pair with fellow coxless four member Hamish Bond. They won gold at every world championship from the 2009 World Rowing Championships to the 2015 World Rowing Championships, as well as doubling up in 2014 to win gold at the coxed pair event as well, setting a new world's best time of 6:33.26. Murray's achievements in both the coxless four and the coxless pair have seen him win two Halberg sports awards team of the year, firstly in 2007 with the four, and then in 2009 with Bond.

Murray has also represented New Zealand at two Olympic Games as part of the coxless four, coming 5th in the A Final at the 2004 Olympics and winning the B Final for a 7th place overall in 2008.

In late December 2011 Murray set a new world record on an indoor rowing machine. On a Concept 2 Dynamic Rowing Machine Murray went 18,728 m in one hour. The story was featured on Television New Zealand.

On 17 January 2012 Murray raced five-time men's single scull world champion Mahé Drysdale in the single scull event at the North Island Club Championships and won by less than half a second. Drysdale and Murray were the only two scullers in the event due to inconsistent crosswinds.

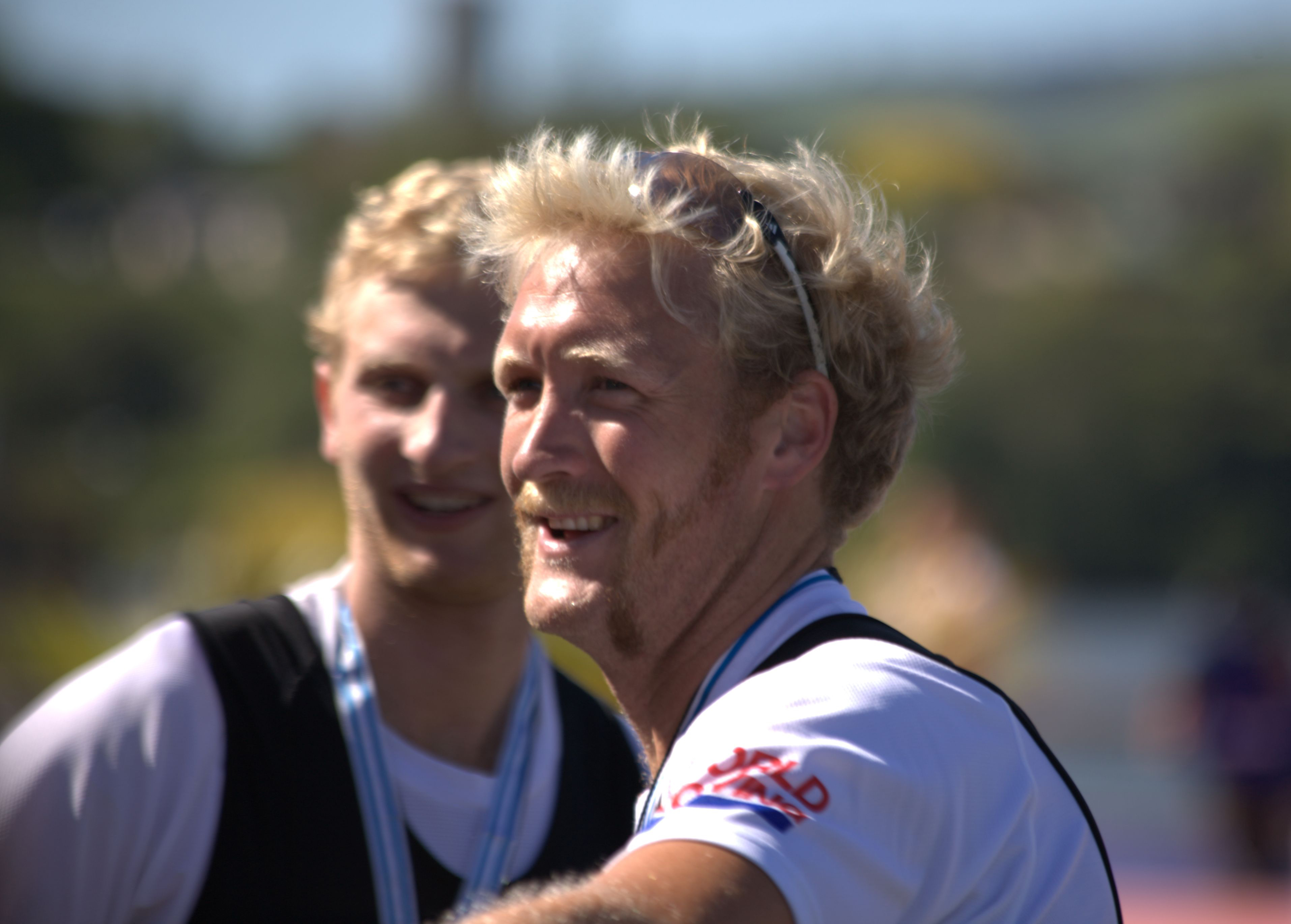
Murray (right) in 2010, with Hamish Bond

At the 2012 London Olympic Games Murray and teammate Hamish Bond took six seconds off the world record to 6:08.5 in their heat for the men's coxless pair. In the Olympic final Murray and Bond surged into the lead after the 500 metre mark to win the gold medal in 6:16.65 by open water. France edged Great Britain for the silver in 6:21.11 v. Great Britain's time of 6:21.77. The victory capped an undefeated streak that began when Murray and Bond began racing the pair internationally in 2009. After the 2016 Rio Olympic Games, in which Murray and Bond successfully defended their coxless pairs title, Murray underwent minor knee surgery and announced that he would not be available for international competitions in 2017, whilst Bond announced in November 2016 that he would take a break from rowing.

Murray was a contestant on the 2022 season of the dancing show Dancing with the Stars.

== Indoor rowing records ==
Event	Result	Date	Source
5000m	14:56.4	16 November 2015	"Concept2 World Records – 5000m". 20 November 2015.
6000m	18:16.8	25 February 2014	"Concept2 World Records – 6000m". 20 November 2015.
10000m	31:05.2	23 December 2014	"Concept2 World Records – 10000m". 20 November 2015.
21097m (Half Marathon)	1:07:58.1	22 December 2013	"Concept2 World Records – 21097m". 20 November 2015.

== Honours ==
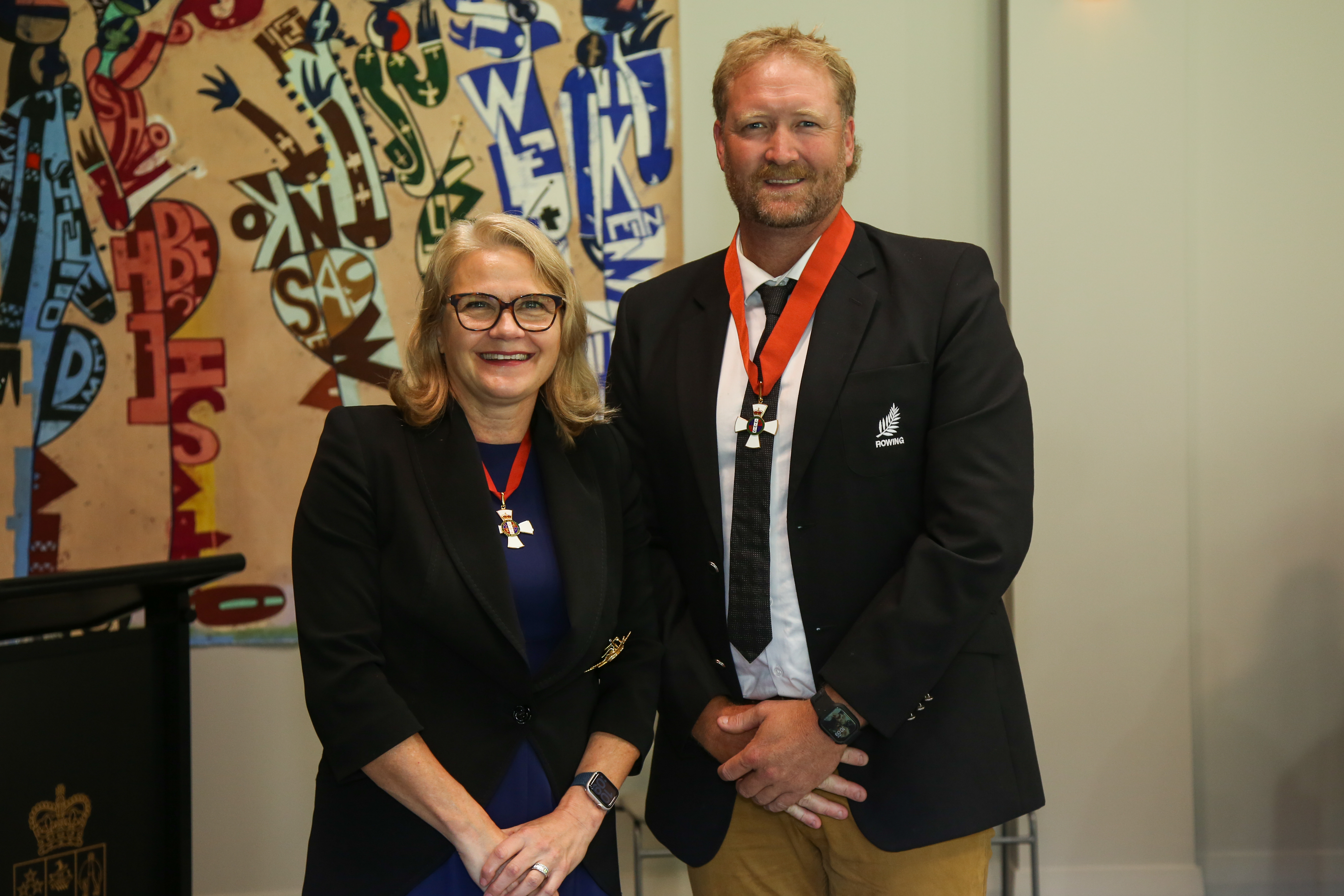
Murray (right), after his investiture as a Companion of the New Zealand Order of Merit by the administrator of the government, Dame Helen Winkelmann, at Government House, Auckland, on 14 April 2023

In the 2013 New Year Honours, Murray was appointed a Member of the New Zealand Order of Merit for services to rowing. In 2018 the International Rowing Federation awarded Murray and Bond the Thomas Keller Medal for their outstanding international rowing career. It is the sport's highest honour and is awarded within five years of the athlete's retirement, acknowledging an exceptional rowing career and exemplary sportsmanship. In the 2023 New Year Honours, he was promoted to Companion of the New Zealand Order of Merit, for services to rowing.

== Notes ==
Awards
Preceded by Caroline & Georgina Evers-Swindell	New Zealand's Team of the Year; 2009; 2012; 2014; With: Hamish Bond	Succeeded by All Whites
Preceded by All Blacks	New Zealand's Team of the Year; 2009; 2012; 2014; With: Hamish Bond	Succeeded by All Blacks
Preceded by All Blacks	New Zealand's Team of the Year; 2009; 2012; 2014; With: Hamish Bond	Succeeded by All Blacks
Preceded by All Blacks	Halberg Awards – Supreme Award; 2012; 2014; With: Hamish Bond	Succeeded by Lydia Ko
Preceded by Lydia Ko	Halberg Awards – Supreme Award; 2012; 2014; With: Hamish Bond	Succeeded by All Blacks
Preceded by Valerie Adams	Lonsdale Cup; 2012; With: Hamish Bond	Succeeded by Valerie Adams
