= Gordon Walker (coach) =

New Zealand canoeist and coach (born 1972)

Personal information
- Born: Gordon David Walker; 1972 (age 53–54) Zimbabwe

Gordon Walker (born c. 1972) is a Zimbabwean-born New Zealand canoe racing coach and former multi sport athlete. He won the Coast to Coast race in 2007, 2009 and 2010. He is currently the head coach of the women's programme at Canoe Racing NZ, a programme that includes Olympic gold-medal winning canoeist Lisa Carrington. He moved to New Zealand from Zimbabwe when he was six years old, along with his two brothers and his parents. At the age of nine, he attended Southwell Boarding School in Hamilton, and at thirteen he attended kings college. He studied at Auckland University and got a bachelor of science.

Awards
Preceded by Steve Hansen	New Zealand's Coach of the Year; 2016, 2017, 2018; 2021; 2023, 2024	Succeeded by Noeline Taurua
Preceded by Noeline Taurua	New Zealand's Coach of the Year; 2016, 2017, 2018; 2021; 2023, 2024	Succeeded by Wayne Smith
Preceded by Wayne Smith	New Zealand's Coach of the Year; 2016, 2017, 2018; 2021; 2023, 2024	Succeeded by James Sandilands
