= Graham Henry =

New Zealand sportsman

Sir Graham Henry KNZM
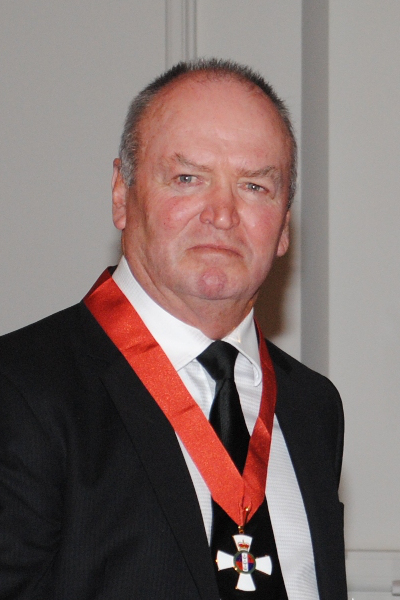
- Henry in 2012
- Born: Graham William Henry; 8 June 1946 (age 80) Christchurch, New Zealand
- School: Christchurch Boys' High School
- University: University of Otago (DipPhEd); Massey University (BEd)
- Occupation: Rugby union coach

Rugby union career
Provincial / State sides
Years	Team	Apps	(Points)
- Canterbury
Coaching career
- Years: Team
- 1992–97: Auckland
- 1996–98: Auckland Blues
- 1998–2002: Wales
- 2001: British and Irish Lions
- 2004–11: New Zealand
- 2012–13: Argentina (assistant coach)
- 2016: Leinster (consultant)
- 2018–: Auckland (assistant coach)
- Cricket career

Cricket information
- Batting: Right-handed
- Role: Wicket-keeper

Domestic team information
- Years: Team
- 1965/66: Canterbury
- 1967/68: Otago
- FC debut: 27 December 1965 Canterbury v Auckland
- Last FC: 9 January 1968 Otago v Canterbury

Career statistics
Competition	First-class
Matches	6
Runs scored	10
Batting average	1.66
100s/50s	0/0
Top score	3*
Catches/stumpings	11/2
- Source: CricketArchive, 3 June 2022

Sir Graham William Henry KNZM (born 8 June 1946) is a New Zealand rugby union coach, and former head coach of the country's national team, the All Blacks. Nicknamed 'Ted', he led New Zealand to win the 2011 World Cup.

Henry played rugby union for Canterbury and cricket for Canterbury and Otago in the Plunket Shield. Before becoming a full-time coach, Henry worked as a school teacher and headmaster.

He coached successful Auckland and Auckland Blues teams in the 1990s, winning National Provincial Championship titles in 1993, 1994, 1995 and 1996 with Auckland, and the inaugural Super 12 title with the Blues in 1996. He coached Wales from 1998 to 2002, with some success, including an 11-match winning streak. He was head coach of the British & Irish Lions in their 2001 tour of Australia, in which they lost the test series 2–1.

He was appointed head coach of New Zealand in 2004, and had several successful seasons, including a series victory over the British & Irish Lions in 2005. Henry was heavily criticised following the All Blacks' quarter-final exit at the 2007 Rugby World Cup and was reappointed amid some controversy. He subsequently led the All Blacks to win the 2011 Rugby World Cup final. He stepped down as All Blacks coach in 2011 after 140 matches in a career that also included five Tri Nations titles.

In 2012, Henry joined Argentina as an advisor, and acted as an assistant coach to the Argentina national team. In 2013, he re-committed to Argentina for the 2013 Rugby Championship.

== Early career ==
After attending Christchurch Boys' High School where he was tutored in part by John Graham, Henry studied at the University of Otago, gained a Diploma in Physical Education in 1969, and became a secondary school geography and physical education teacher. He taught at two schools known for their rugby prowess – Auckland Grammar School and Kelston Boys' High School. He coached both their first XVs. He began his career at Auckland Grammar School as a Physical Education Teacher in 1973 and remained there – while completing a Bachelor of Education at Massey University in 1979 until 1982, when he was appointed deputy headmaster of Kelston. Following the unexpected death of headmaster Jim Paton while jogging in 1987, Henry became headmaster. He held the job until resigning to become a full-time coach in 1996.

His first major role was as coach of the successful Auckland provincial rugby team from 1992 to 1997. During his tenure, the team won the National Provincial Championship (NPC) four years in a row (1993–1996). Henry also coached the Blues in the Super 12 – winning the title in 1996 and 1997, and losing the final in 1998. He returned to the Blues as technical advisor for the 2003 season, in which they were again crowned champions.

== Wales and Lions ==
After being overlooked for the All Blacks coaching position in 1996, Henry left New Zealand in 1998 to coach Wales, at the time becoming the highest paid rugby union coach in the world for a reputed £250,000 per year. His success with Wales resulted in him being given the nickname "the Great Redeemer" in the media there after guiding his side to eleven consecutive victories in 1999. As a result, Henry gained celebrity status in Wales. He was appointed coach of the British and Irish Lions for their unsuccessful 2001 tour to Australia – this made him the first Lions' coach from outside the Home Nations since Arthur O'Brien in 1904. He left Wales in 2002 after a record defeat to Ireland in the Six Nations by 54–10, and returned to New Zealand where he was appointed defensive coach of the Blues during their successful 2003 Super 12 season.

== All Blacks ==
Following the All Blacks' semi-final loss to Australia in the 2003 Rugby World Cup the All Blacks coaching job was advertised. Apart from incumbent coach John Mitchell, Henry was the only applicant and took the job in December of that year. Henry appointed his former Wales assistant Steve Hansen as forwards coach, Wayne Smith as attack coach, and having himself responsible for defence. Henry also recruited Sir Brian Lochore as a selector. The coaching team was often referred to by rugby commentators as the Three Wise Men due to their collective experience and success.

His first Test match as coach was against the Rugby World Cup 2003 winners England team in New Zealand in 2004. England, coached by Sir Clive Woodward were decisively defeated in both Tests. The success did not carry on into the 2004 Tri-Nations where the All Blacks won two, and lost two Tests – they eventually finished last in the tournament. Henry and his assistants were criticised in the New Zealand media for their insistence on using a flat backline approach in attack – which they blamed for a low number of tries. The 2004 end of year Tests where they played Northern Hemisphere opponents was more successful and culminated in a 45–6 defeat of France in Paris.

In 2005 he coached the All Blacks in their 3–0 series defeat of the British and Irish Lions. He then coached the All Blacks to 2005 Tri-Nations victory where they lost their only match of 2005 – against South Africa. He then coached them to only their second ever Grand Slam over the four Home Nations later that year. The All Blacks were named 2005 IRB International Team of the Year by the sport's governing body, the International Rugby Board (IRB). The IRB named Henry as Coach of the Year and first five-eighth Dan Carter as Player of the Year.

After winning the 2006 Tri-Nations and winning all end-of-year Tests in the tour of England, France and Wales, Henry won the IRB Coach of the Year again in 2006. The All Blacks were also named IRB International Team of the Year and captain Richie McCaw Player of the Year.

Despite such successes, Henry attracted controversy for his rotation policy. This policy means that players in the squad are rotated into and out of the starting team resulting in consecutive matches in the All Blacks 2005 Grand Slam fielding entirely different starting fifteens. An extreme competitiveness developed for all positions.

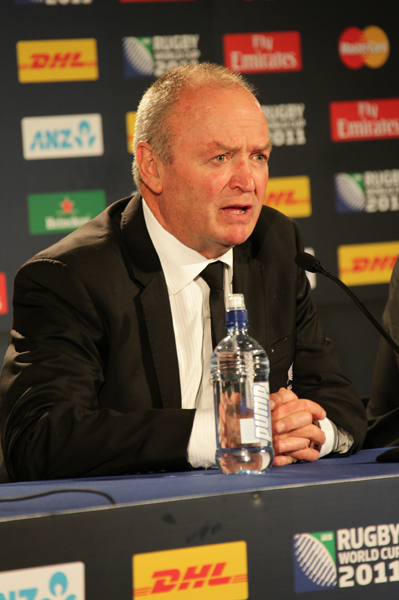
Henry in 2011

Henry's All Black coaching career was in question after New Zealand lost to France 20–18 in their 2007 World Cup quarter-final. This was New Zealand's worst-ever performance in a Rugby World Cup; they had made the last four of every previous tournament. In particular, Henry was blamed for instructing his men to press for a try in the final 10 minutes of the game instead of attempting a drop goal, with the All Blacks losing by only two points; the All Blacks' best option for a drop goal, centre Aaron Mauger, never got onto the pitch. Others criticised Henry for omitting experienced winger Doug Howlett, the All Blacks' leading scorer of tries in this tournament, starting lock Keith Robinson (who was both injured and had had minimum game time throughout the World Cup) as well as the injured flyhalf Daniel Carter (after earlier proclaiming that his team had enough depth not to force any injured players onto the field), and playing Mils Muliaina, widely considered one of the best fullbacks in rugby, out of position at outside centre.

Henry never stated that referee Wayne Barnes was culpable for the defeat, as Barnes not only allowed several French ruck infringements to go unpunished, but also sin-binned Luke McAlister and missed a forward pass in the buildup to the decisive French try scored by Yannick Jauzion. This later led to him receiving a fair sportsmans award, the second New Zealander after Tana Umaga. After some speculation that he would leave, Henry applied for the post after it became vacant, competing with Robbie Deans.

On 7 December 2007, Henry's contract as All Blacks coach was extended for a further two years, beating Crusaders's coach Robbie Deans, who subsequently accepted the head coaching position of the Australian rugby union team, the Wallabies. The reappointment produced a mixed reception with the public, media and past players; some applauded the decision while others considered it a mistake. The move to reappoint Henry was also significant as it was the first time that an All Black coach was reappointed after defeat in the World Cup. This has been very divisive in New Zealand with many commentators declaring that it was a case of politics at work.

Upon his reappointment Henry stated that Richie McCaw would become the captain of the All Blacks, and declared that he would be looking for new tight forwards for the All Blacks.

In July 2009, Henry was reappointed as the coach of the All Blacks through until the end of 2011. This contract saw him coaching the All Blacks through the 2011 Rugby World Cup which was held in New Zealand and won by the All Blacks beating France 8–7 in the final.

During a series against France 2009 for contest of the Dave Gallagher Trophy he did not tell the All Blacks that they needed to win by a specified margin to secure the trophy. He said this was done because the All Blacks were "relatively young" and didn't need the extra pressure. This was not accepted as sound reasoning by all players.

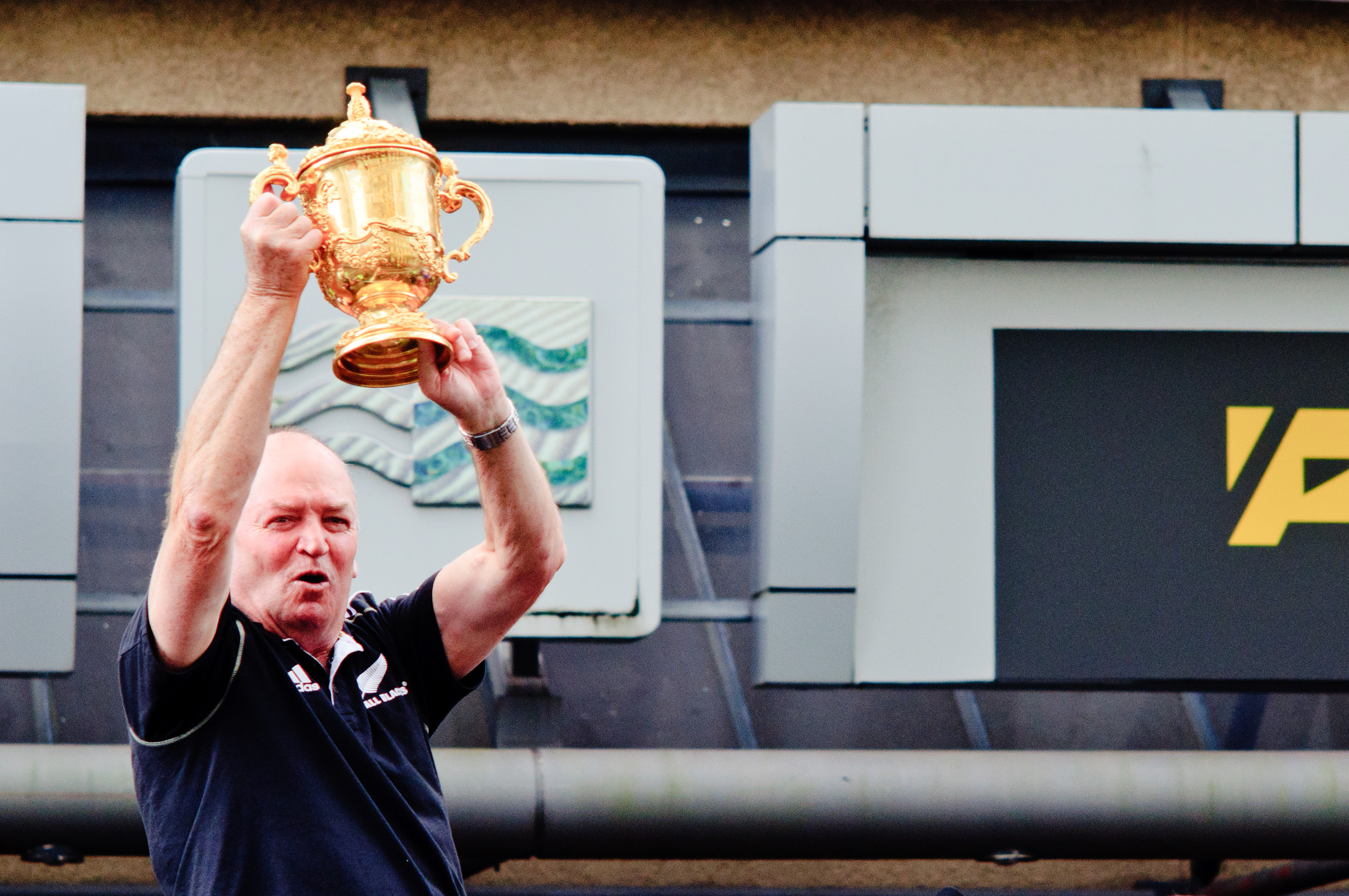
Henry in 2011

At the IRB Awards in 2011, Henry and his team both captured awards. The All Blacks were named IRB International Team of the Year and Graham Henry IRB International Coach of the Year for the 5th time.

On 1 November 2011, Henry announced he would step down as coach, finishing his All Blacks career as one of the most successful rugby coaches of all time: he coached the All Blacks to 88 wins in 103 tests for a winning percentage of 85.4 percent. In February 2012, he took a two-year part-time position with the NZRU as a mentor for the country's Super Rugby and ITM Cup coaches. In April 2012, Henry began serving for one year in a similar role with the Argentina Rugby Union (UAR), primarily as a mentor to that country's high-level coaches and also as an assistant with the national team. His NZRU contract prohibits him from being part of the Pumas' coaching staff for their matches against New Zealand during the 2012 Rugby Championship, but the NZRU has given him its blessing to work with the UAR at other times.

== Personal life ==
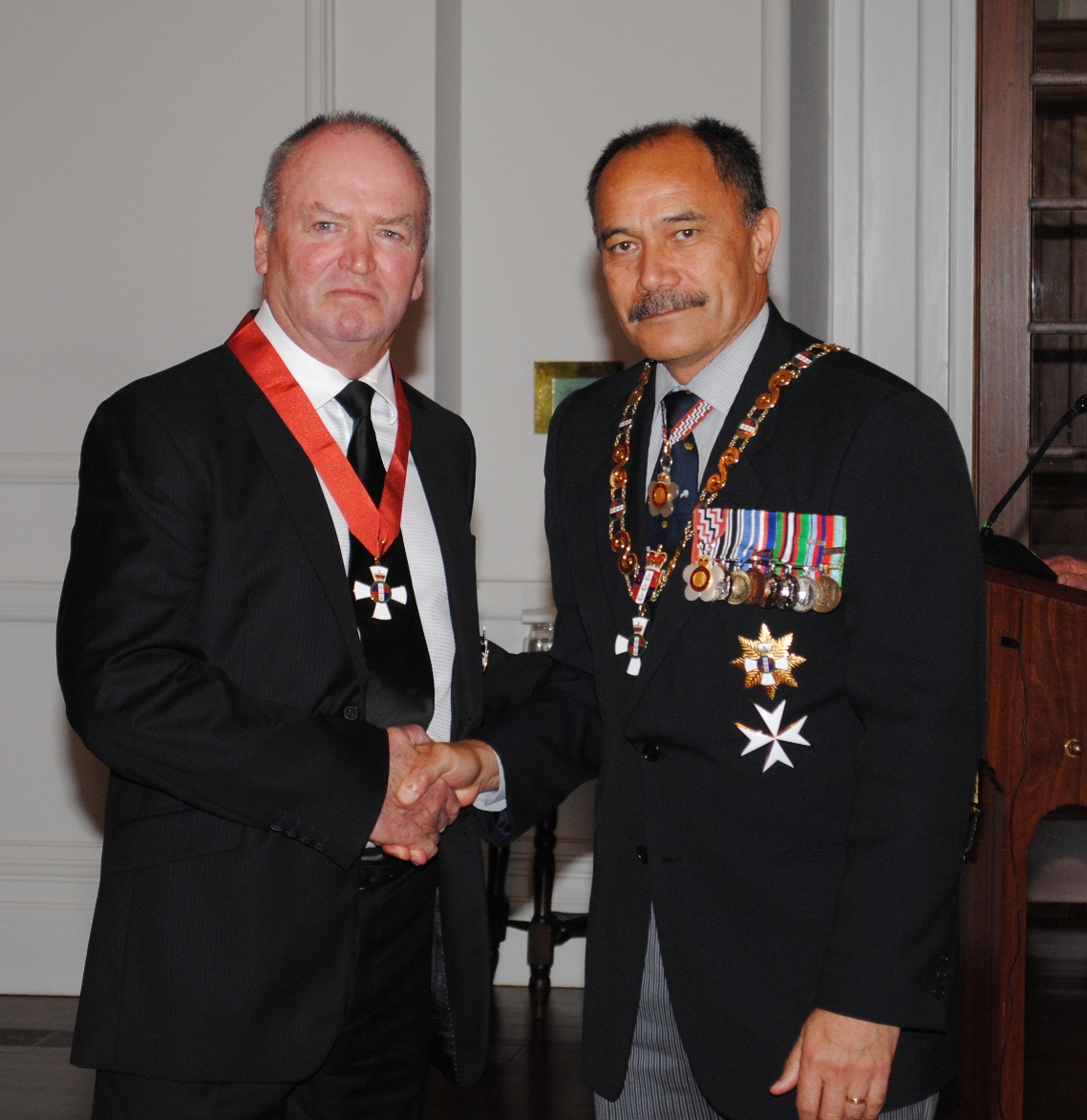
Henry with Jerry Mateparae in 2012

Henry met his wife Raewyn at university. She was head coach of the Wales national netball team. They reside in Waiheke Island, and have three children.

Henry was made a Knight Companion of the New Zealand Order of Merit (KNZM) in the 2012 New Year Honours, for services to rugby.

In 2020, he was the coach for the Match Fit squad, an old-boys team of former All Blacks for a one-off game against Barbarians. On the show, he admitted that he should not have taken the role as the Lions coach while being the Welsh coach in 2001. After the tour, he developed depression. He had recovered after leaving the Welsh coaching job in 2002, but also helped him cope with the loss at the 2007 World Cup. In 2021/22, he reprised the role in season 2. He, the late Va'aiga Tuigamala and Brad Mika were the only Auckland-based members in season 2.

Awards
Preceded by Jake White	IRB International Coach of the Year; 2005, 2006; 2008; 2010, 2011	Succeeded by Jake White
Preceded by Jake White	IRB International Coach of the Year; 2005, 2006; 2008; 2010, 2011	Succeeded by Declan Kidney
Preceded by Declan Kidney	IRB International Coach of the Year; 2005, 2006; 2008; 2010, 2011	Succeeded by Steve Hansen
Preceded by Richard Tonks	New Zealand's Coach of the Year; 2006; 2011	Succeeded by Kirsten Hellier
Preceded by Ricki Herbert	New Zealand's Coach of the Year; 2006; 2011	Succeeded by Richard Tonks
Sporting positions
Preceded by Kevin Bowring	Wales coach 1998–2002	Succeeded by Steve Hansen
Preceded by John Mitchell	All Blacks coach 2004–2011	Succeeded by Steve Hansen
