= Rebecca Spence (triathlete) =

New Zealand triathlete

Personal information
- Born: 19 September 1988 (age 37) Auckland, New Zealand
- Height: 1.79 m (5 ft 10 in)
- Weight: 75 kg (165 lb)

Sport
- Country: New Zealand
- Sport: Triathlon

Rebecca Spence (born 19 September 1988) is a New Zealand triathlete who represented her country at the 2018 Commonwealth Games on the Gold Coast, finishing in tenth place in the women's triathlon.

Awards
New award	Halberg Awards – Emerging Talent Award; 2006	Succeeded by Emma Twigg
