= Wayne Smith (rugby union) =

Rugby union coach and former rugby union player

Wayne Smith KNZM
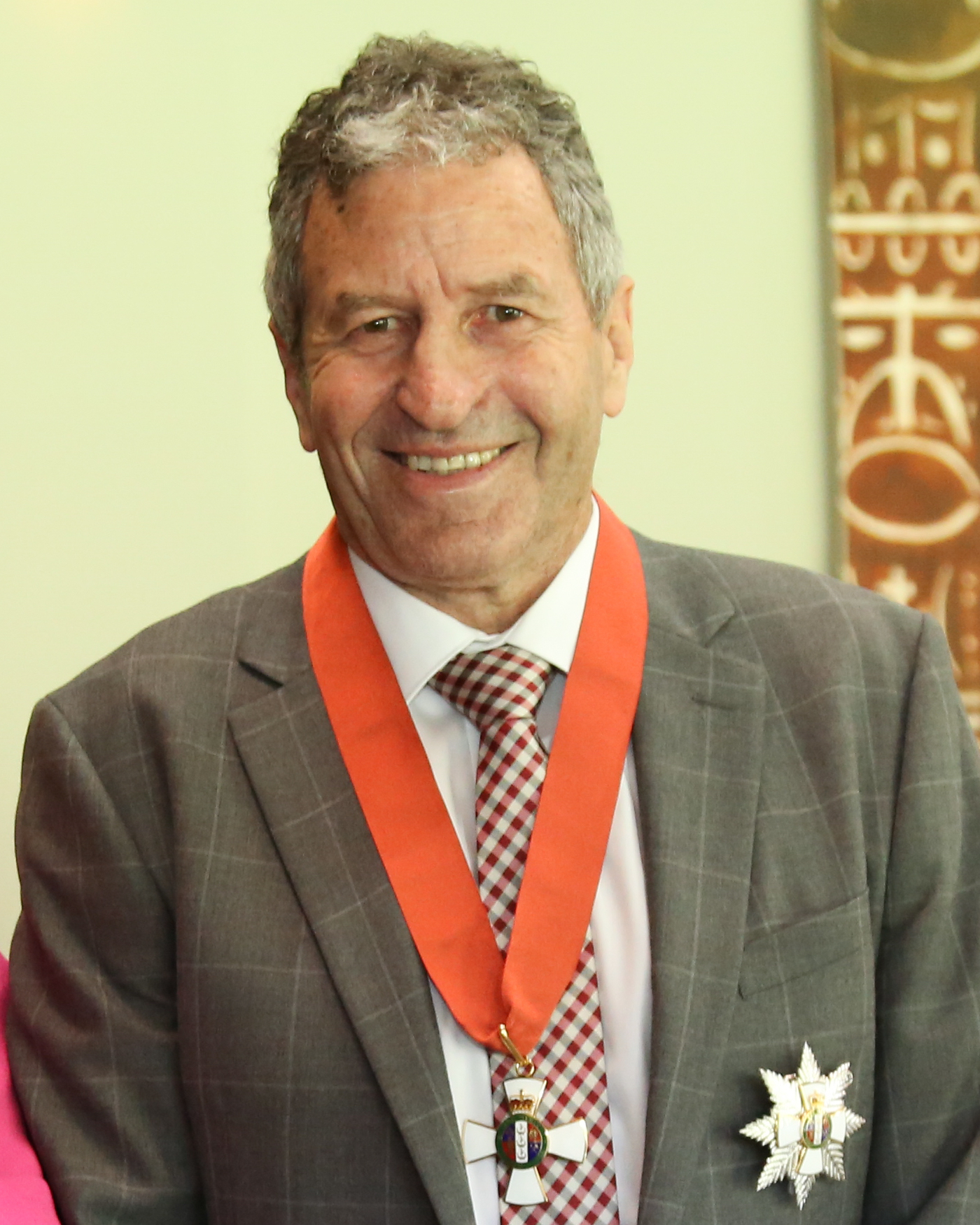
- Smith in 2023
- Born: Wayne Ross Smith; 19 April 1957 (age 69) Putāruru, New Zealand
- Height: 1.78 m (5 ft 10 in)
- Weight: 78 kg (12 st 4 lb)
- School: Putaruru High School
- University: University of Waikato

Rugby union career
- Position: First five-eighth
Provincial / State sides
Years	Team	Apps	(Points)
1979–1985, 1989	Canterbury	72	(103)
International career
Years	Team	Apps	(Points)
1980–85	New Zealand	17	(6)
1986	New Zealand Cavaliers	1	
Coaching career
- Years: Team
- 1986–88: ASD Rugby Casale
- 1992–94: Benetton Treviso
- 1997–99: Crusaders
- 2000–01: New Zealand
- 2001–04: Northampton Saints
- 2004–11: New Zealand (asst. coach)
- 2012–14: Chiefs (asst. coach)
- 2015–2017: New Zealand (asst. coach)
- 2022: New Zealand women
Medal record
Representing New Zealand
Women's rugby union
Women's Rugby World Cup
Gold medal – first place	2021 New Zealand	Team competition

Sir Wayne Ross Smith KNZM (born 19 April 1957) is a New Zealand rugby union coach and former player. He has won three Rugby World Cups; he was an assistant coach with New Zealand's men's team, the All Blacks, who won the 2011 and 2015 World Cups, and was head coach of the New Zealand women's team, the Black Ferns, won the 2021 World Cup, held in 2022.

He was previously the head coach of New Zealand's men's team, the All Blacks (2000–2001), and assistant coach for two spells (2004–11 and 2015–2017). He also coached the Crusaders to win the 1998 and 1999 Super Rugby title, and the Chiefs to win the 2012 and 2013 Super Rugby titles.

As a player, Smith won 17 international caps for New Zealand between 1980 and 1985. He also toured with the New Zealand Cavaliers in 1986, playing in one of the test matches against South Africa.

== Playing ==
Growing up in Putāruru, Smith played for Waikato Secondary Schools in 1974, then worked his way up to the province's colt and B teams. He studied at Waikato University in Hamilton while playing club rugby in Putaruru, and in 1978 he was on the bench for one top grade Waikato match. "Frustrated" after that season, he decided to look for opportunities elsewhere, and moved to Canterbury where Belfast became his second (and final) club.

Smith played for Canterbury under the leadership of Doug Bruce and Alex Wyllie, and made his international debut in 1980. He played first five-eighth, winning 17 Test caps.

In the Rugby Almanack of New Zealand, he was selected as one of the "Five players of the year" for the 1984 season.

== Coaching ==
Smith had two spells coaching in Italy, with ASD Rugby Casale (as player-coach, 1986–88) and Benetton Treviso (1992–94).

His first major coaching role in New Zealand was for the Crusaders in the Super 12 competition in 1997. He coached them to two titles in 1998 and 1999 before being appointed All Blacks coach after the 1999 Rugby World Cup.

With the All Blacks in 2001, Smith was bitterly disappointed after two close losses to Australia, failing to win the Bledisloe Cup from them and finishing second to Australia twice in the 2000 and 2001 Tri Nations. He decided to reapply for his job but John Mitchell was chosen instead.

Smith went on to coach the Northampton Saints in England. He coached there until being appointed backs coach in early 2004 by then All Blacks' coach Graham Henry.

In 2010, All Black scrum half Justin Marshall spoke about the best piece of coaching advice he'd received came from Smith: "I was going through a bad patch and he told me to go out and trust my instincts and be decisive – you need to trust what you do is going to be the right thing and if you do it decisively you'll make good of it even if it's the wrong option because you'll do it with purpose. That's the best piece of advice I've been given."

Smith took up the assistant coaching position at the New Zealand Super Rugby team the Chiefs in 2012. That year the Chiefs won their first Super Rugby title by defeating the Sharks 37–6 in the final. In August 2012 Smith declared he wanted to stay with the Chiefs, despite being approached by the Western Force and NSW Waratahs, and an offer from England.

Smith rejoined the All Blacks' coaching staff in 2015, ahead of the 2015 Rugby World Cup, which New Zealand won.

On 19 May 2017 Smith announced he would be stepping down as assistant coach at the conclusion of the 2017 Rugby Championship in October, after over 200 games as a coach of the All Blacks since 2004, and retiring from full-time coaching. During his time coaching the All Blacks his record is 212 games, 184 wins, 21 losses and 7 draws. Smith's final game with the All Blacks came on 21 October against Australia in Brisbane where the All Blacks lost 23–18.

In 2018 Smith moved to Japan and became Director of Rugby at Kobelco Kobe Steelers. During his tenure he has helped the team to win two back to back Top League Japanese championships, with a record of 24 wins, 2 draws, 1 loss out of 27 games.

On 21 April 2022, New Zealand Rugby confirmed that Smith had been selected as the Black Ferns' new Head Coach. He coached the team to 12 wins from 12 matches and winning the 2022 Women's Rugby World Cup in the process.

== Honours ==
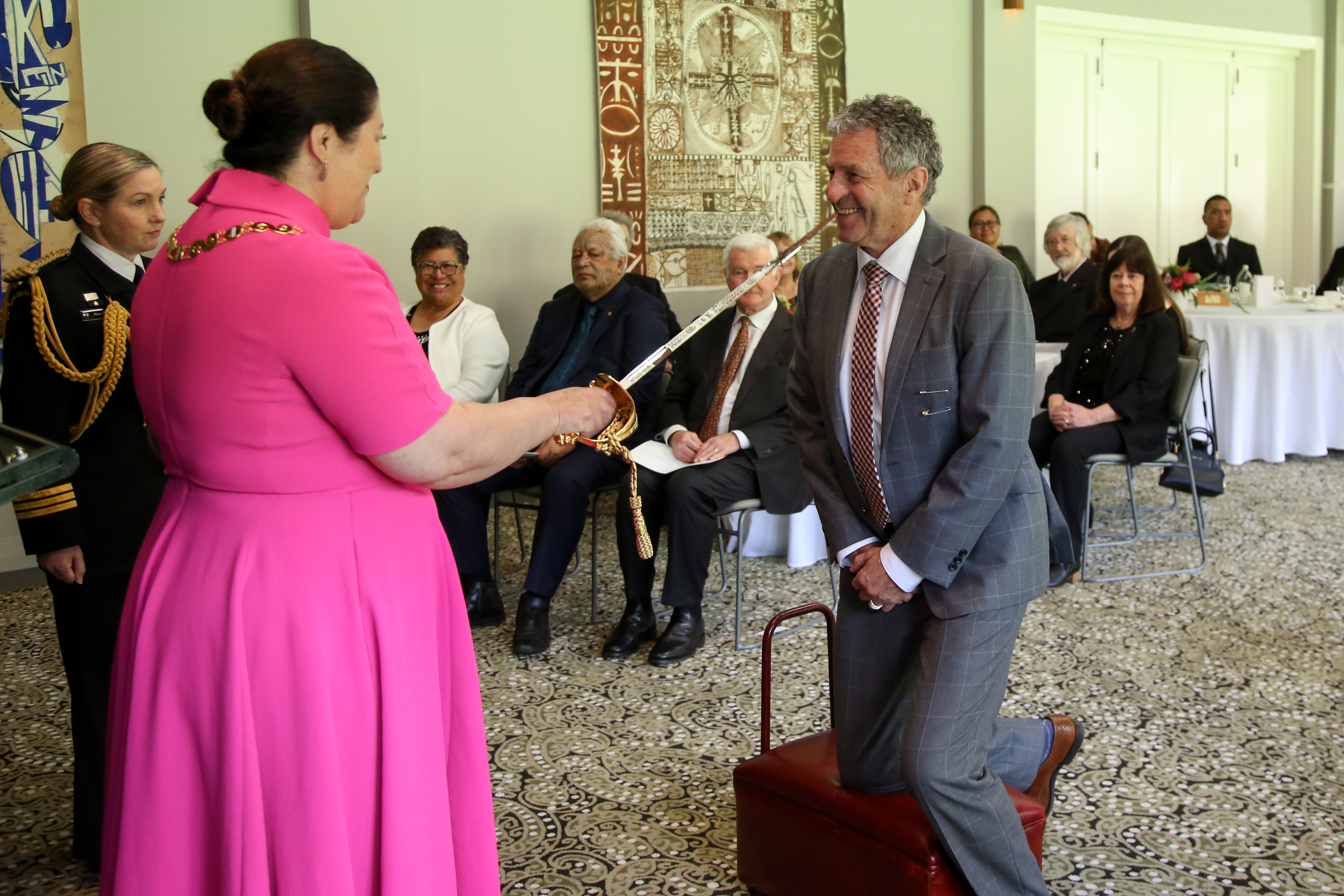
Smith's investiture as a Knight Companion of the New Zealand Order of Merit by the governor-general, Dame Cindy Kiro, at Government House, Auckland, on 8 September 2023

In the 2012 Queen's Birthday and Diamond Jubilee Honours, Smith was appointed a Companion of the New Zealand Order of Merit, for services to rugby.

At the 2022 World Rugby Awards he won Coach of the Year.

In the 2023 King's Birthday and Coronation Honours, Smith was promoted to Knight Companion of the New Zealand Order of Merit, for services to rugby and his charity work helping children with cerebral palsy.

He received the inaugural Legacy Award at the 2024 New Zealander of the Year Awards, recognising his lifetime contribution.

Sporting positions
Preceded by John Hart	All Blacks coach 2000–2001	Succeeded by John Mitchell
Preceded by Glenn Moore	Black Ferns coach 2022	Succeeded by Allan Bunting
Awards
Preceded by Gordon Walker	Halberg Awards – Coach of the Year; 2022	Succeeded by Gordon Walker
