= Cory Sweeney =

Rugby union career
Coaching career
- Years: Team
- 2021 – present: New Zealand 7s (Head Coach)
- 2019–2021: New Zealand 7s (Co-coach)
Medal record
Representing New Zealand
Women's rugby sevens
Olympic Games
| Gold medal – first place | 2024 Paris | Team competition |
| Gold medal – first place | 2020 Tokyo | Team competition |

Cory Sweeney (born 8 March 1978) is a New Zealand rugby sevens coach. He is currently the New Zealand women's national rugby sevens team Head Coach. He was appointed after the Tokyo Olympics.

Sweeney was the Black Ferns Sevens assistant coach in 2016. He then Co-coached the Black Ferns Sevens team with Allan Bunting from 2019 until the Tokyo Olympics in 2021. He was nominated with Allan Bunting for the Halberg Coach of the Year award in 2022.

Following Bunting's departure to take charge of the New Zealand women's fifteen-a-side team, Sweeney became the sevens team's head coach. During the 2022-2023 Sevens season he coached the sevens team to winning six straight tournaments, and 41 consecutive games to secure them that season's title. For his efforts he was named national coach of the year at the New Zealand Rugby awards in December 2023. He coached the team to claim a back-to-back gold medal at the 2024 Paris Olympics. At the second tournament of the 2024-2025 Sevens season held in Cape Town on 7–8 December 2024, he celebrated coaching at his 50th tournament of the Sevens series.
