= Don Tricker =

New Zealand softball player

Donald Francis Tricker ONZM is a former player and coach of the New Zealand national softball team (Black Sox) and former senior advisor of high performance coaching at the New Zealand Academy of Sport. He served as high performance manager for New Zealand Rugby from 2010 to 2018, when he joined the San Diego Padres as director of player health and performance.

== Family background ==
Tricker's grandfather was one of the country's leading softball umpires and played a key role in introducing the game to the Wellington region.

== Sporting career ==
=== Player ===
Tricker played softball for Porirua until he was 22 then moved to Poneke Kilbirnie, claiming regional and national titles with both clubs, and played for the Black Sox on and off between 1986 and 1991.

=== Coach ===
Tricker began his softball coaching career at Poneke Kilbirnie in 1996, while he was still playing, and was named Black Sock coach two years later. He coached the team to two world championship wins in 2000 and three consecutive world titles. He retired as national coach in 2004, being replaced by Eddie Kohlhase.

In 2002, after six years in the information technology sector, Tricker was appointed as senior advisor of high performance coaching at the New Zealand Academy of Sport, a unit of Sport and Recreation New Zealand. Tricker and Auckland lawyer Mike Heron prepared a report into the All Blacks early World Cup exit. In 2010 the New Zealand Rugby Union has appointed Tricker as the High Performance Manager.

In 2018, he joined Major League Baseball's San Diego Padres as director of player health and performance.

== Honours and awards ==
Tricker was named coach of the year at the 2000 Halberg Awards, after leading the team to a world series victory in South Africa In the 2004 Queen's Birthday Honours, he was appointed an Officer of the New Zealand Order of Merit, for services to softball.
