= Allan Bunting =

New Zealand rugby player (born 1975)

- Born: 11 February 1975 (age 51)

Rugby union career
- Position: Coach
Provincial / State sides
Years	Team	Apps	(Points)
	Bay of Plenty Steamers		(0)
Super Rugby
Years	Team	Apps	(Points)
	Chiefs		(0)
National sevens team
Years	Team		Comps
	New Zealand		14
Coaching career
- Years: Team
- 2012–2016: Black Ferns 7s (Assistant coach)
- 2016–2021: Black Ferns 7s
- 2022: Chiefs Manawa
- 2022: Black Ferns (Assistant coach)
- 2023–2025: Black Ferns (Head coach)

Allan Bunting (born 11 February 1975) is a New Zealand rugby union and sevens coach. He previously coached the Black Ferns sevens and was the inaugural head coach of the Chiefs Manawa in the Super Rugby Aupiki competition. He coached the Black Ferns fifteens from 2023 to 2025.

== Playing career ==
Between 1999 and 2009 Bunting played for the New Zealand sevens team, the Chiefs, the Bay of Plenty Steamers and Tokyo Gas.

== Coaching career ==
Bunting was the assistant coach for the Black Ferns Sevens from 2012 to 2016. He has also been the skills coach for the All Blacks Sevens and assistant coach for the Wellington Lions Sevens.

Bunting replaced Sean Horan as head coach of the New Zealand women's sevens team after the 2016 Summer Olympics. After taking leave in 2019, he returned and co-coached the team with Cory Sweeney until the Tokyo Olympics. They won gold after defeating France in the Gold medal final. Bunting stepped down as co-coach after the Olympics and was later appointed as Chiefs Manawa head coach.

In February 2023, Bunting was appointed as the Black Ferns coach through to the 2025 Rugby World Cup in England. He replaced Wayne Smith as the Black Ferns Director of Rugby. He stepped down as Black Ferns head coach after the World Cup in 2025.

Sporting positions
Preceded by Wayne Smith	Black Ferns coach 2023–2025	Succeeded by Whitney Hansen
