= World Rugby Awards =

Annual awards for rugby union

- Awarded for: Excellence in rugby
- Presented by: World Rugby
- First award: 2001; 25 years ago
- Website: World Rugby Awards

The World Rugby Awards are given out annually by World Rugby (until November 2014, known as the International Rugby Board), the worldwide governing body for rugby union, for major achievements in the sport. The idea of rewarding excellence in rugby was disclosed in 2001 following the Annual Meeting of the International Rugby Board Council in Copenhagen, and the first ceremony was first awarded later that year. The International Rugby Players' Association also gives out awards, for Try of the Year (since 2007), and Special Merit, as a part of the programme. As of 2021, they now present Women's Try of the Year.

In 2020, World Rugby decided to "look back on a decade of international rugby" instead of presenting the usual awards. Six of the categories were decided by fan votes and two by a selected panel. The 'Special Edition Awards' focused on "...members of the rugby family who had showcased solidarity during the COVID-19 pandemic, supporting their communities and getting involved in relief efforts."

World Rugby reintroduced the normal awards in 2021 with a few new additions. Unlike previous years where a majority of the awards were selected by an independent panel, half of the categories will now be selected by public voting.

== 2001 ==
- IRB Player of the Year: Keith Wood Ireland
- IRB International Team of the Year: Australia
- IRB International Coach of the Year: Rod Macqueen Australia
- IRB International Young Player of the Year: Gavin Henson Wales
- IRB International Women's Player of the Year: Shelley Rae England
- IRB Referee Award for Distinguished Service: Ed Morrison England
- IRB Spirit of Rugby Award: Tim Grandadge India
- IRB Distinguished Service Award: Tom Kiernan Ireland
- IRB Development Award: Jorge Brasceras Uruguay
- IRB Chairman's Awards: Kath McLean, Sir Terry McLean, Albert Ferrasse, John Eales

== 2002 ==
- IRB Player of the Year: Fabien Galthié France
- IRB International Team of the Year: France
- IRB International Coach of the Year: Bernard Laporte France
- IRB International U19 Player of the Year: Luke McAlister New Zealand
- IRB International U21 Player of the Year: Pat Barnard South Africa
- IRB International Sevens Team of the Year: New Zealand
- IRB International Women's Player of the Year: Monique Hirovanaa New Zealand
- IRB Referee Award for Distinguished Service: Colin Hawke New Zealand
- IRB Distinguished Services Award: Allan Hosie Scotland
- IRB Spirit of Rugby Award: Old Christians Club Uruguay
- IRB Development Award: John Broadfoot England
- IRB Chairman's Awards: Bill Mclaren, George Pippos (posthumously)

== 2003 ==
- IRB International Player of the Year: Jonny Wilkinson England
- IRB International Team of the Year: England
- IRB International Coach of the Year: Sir Clive Woodward England
- IRB International U19 Player of the Year: Jean Baptiste Payras France
- IRB International U21 Player of the Year: Ben Atiga New Zealand
- IRB International Sevens Team of the Year: New Zealand
- IRB Spirit of Rugby Award: Michael & Linda Collinson Eswatini
- IRB Award for Distinguished Service: Bob Stuart Australia
- IRB Referee Distinguished Service Award: Derek Bevan Wales
- IRB International Women's Personality of the Year: Kathy Flores United States
- IRB Development Award: Tan Theany & Philippe Monnin
- IRB Chairman's Award: Vernon Pugh Wales

== 2004 ==
- IRB International Player of the Year: Schalk Burger South Africa
- IRB International Team of the Year: South Africa
- IRB International Coach of the Year: Jake White South Africa
- IRB International U19 Player of the Year: Jeremy Thrush New Zealand
- IRB International U21 Player of the Year: Jerome Kaino New Zealand
- IRB International Sevens Team of the Year: New Zealand
- IRB International Sevens Player of the Year: Simon Amor England
- IRB Spirit of Rugby Award: Jarrod Cunningham New Zealand
- Vernon Pugh Award for Distinguished Service: Ronnie Dawson Ireland
- IRB Referee Award for Distinguished Service: Jim Fleming Scotland
- IRB International Women's Personality of the Year: Donna Kennedy Scotland
- IRB Development Award: Guedel Ndiaye Senegal
- IRB Chairman's Award: Marcel Martin France

== 2005 ==
- IRB International Player of the Year: Daniel Carter New Zealand
- IRB International Team of the Year: New Zealand
- IRB International Coach of the Year: Graham Henry New Zealand
- IRB International U19 Player of the Year: Isaia Toeava New Zealand
- IRB International U21 Player of the Year: Tatafu Polota-Nau Australia
- IRB International Sevens Team of the Year: Fiji
- IRB International Sevens Player of the Year: Orene Ai’i New Zealand
- IRB Spirit of Rugby Award: Jean Pierre Rives France
- Vernon Pugh Award for Distinguished Service: Peter Crittle Australia
- IRB Referee Award for Distinguished Service: Paddy O'Brien New Zealand
- IRB International Women's Personality of the Year: Farah Palmer New Zealand
- IRB Development Award: Robert Antonin France
- IRB Chairman's Award: Sir Tasker Watkins V.C., G.B.E, D.L Wales

== 2006 ==
- IRB International Player of the Year: Richie McCaw, New Zealand
- IRB International Team of the Year: New Zealand
- IRB International Coach of the Year: Graham Henry, New Zealand
- IRB International U19 Player of the Year: Josh Holmes Australia
- IRB International U21 Player of the Year: Lionel Beauxis France
- IRB International Sevens Team of the Year: Fiji
- IRB International Sevens Player of the Year: Uale Mai Samoa
- IRB Spirit of Rugby Award: Polly Miller
- Vernon Pugh Award for Distinguished Service: Brian Lochore New Zealand
- IRB Referee Award for Distinguished Service: Peter Marshall Australia
- IRB International Women's Personality of the Year: Margaret Alphonsi England
- IRB Development Award: Mike Luke Canada
- IRB Hall of Fame inductees: William Webb Ellis and Rugby School England

== 2007 ==
- IRB International Player of the Year: Bryan Habana, South Africa
- IRB International Team of the Year: South Africa
- IRB International Coach of the Year: Jake White, South Africa
- IRB Under-19 Player of the Year: Robert Fruean, New Zealand
- IRB Sevens Player of the Year: Afeleke Pelenise, New Zealand
- IRB Sevens Team of the Year: New Zealand
- IRB Women's Personality of the Year: Sarah Corrigan, referee, Australia
  In 2007, she became the first woman ever to referee in an IRB 15-man tournament outside of the Women's Rugby World Cup when she took charge of the match between Zimbabwe and Canada in the 2007 Under 19 Rugby World Championship.
- IRB Referee Award for Distinguished Service: Dick Byres, retired, Australia
  After refereeing 14 Tests, he was a charter member of the IRB Referee Selector panel when it was formed in 1997, and was the longest-serving member of the panel when he retired in 2007.
- Vernon Pugh Award for Distinguished Service: José María Epalza, Spain
  After a playing career that saw him earn 38 caps for Spain, and coaching the Spanish national team from 1986 to 1990, he went on to a distinguished career in rugby administration, serving in several key posts in the Spanish Rugby Federation and FIRA–AER.
- Spirit of Rugby Award: Nicolas Pueta, Argentina
  Pueta regularly plays club rugby despite having a congenital femoral deficiency that meant that his left leg never grew to the same size as his right one.
- IRPA Try of the Year: Takudzwa Ngwenya, United States
- IRPA Special Merit Award: Fabien Pelous, France
  Pelous is the most-capped player in France history, and also the most-capped lock ever.
- IRB Development Award: Jacob Thompson, Jamaica
  Ever since returning home to Jamaica from England in the 1970s, Thompson has tirelessly worked to promote the sport in his homeland. He has been president of the Jamaica Rugby Union since 1999.
- IRB Hall of Fame inductees:
  - Pierre de Coubertin, France
  - Wilson Whineray, New Zealand
  - Danie Craven, South Africa
  - Gareth Edwards, Wales
  - John Eales, Australia

== 2008 ==
- IRB Player of the Year: Shane Williams, Wales
- IRB International Team of the Year: New Zealand
- IRB International Coach of the Year: Graham Henry, New Zealand
- IRB Junior Player of the Year: Luke Braid, New Zealand
- IRB International Sevens Player of the Year: DJ Forbes, New Zealand
- IRB Spirit of Rugby Award: Roelien Muller and Patrick Cotter
- IRB Referee Award for Distinguished Service: Andre Watson South Africa
- IRB International Women's Personality of the Year: Carol Isherwood England
- IRPA Special Merit Award: Agustín Pichot Argentina
- IRB Development Award: TAG Rugby Development Trust and Martin Hansford England
- IRPA Try of the Year: Brian O'Driscoll Ireland

== 2009 ==
- IRB Player of the Year: Richie McCaw New Zealand
- IRB International Team of the Year: South Africa
- IRB International Coach of the Year: Declan Kidney Ireland
- IRB Junior Player of the Year: Aaron Cruden New Zealand
- IRB International Sevens Player of the Year: Ollie Phillips England
- IRB Spirit of Rugby Award: L'Aquila Rugby Italy
  The town of L'Aquila, with long rugby traditions, was hit on 6 April 2009 by an earthquake which left 307 people dead and tens of thousands homeless. Amongst the victims was promising young prop Lorenzo Sebastiani, who had played in the last IRB Junior World Championship in Wales. L'Aquila Rugby Club provided shelter, refuge and comfort to people in the town. L'Aquila's Rugby were in the front line of the rescue effort, and helped evacuate victims from damaged buildings.
- IRB Referee Award for Distinguished Service: to be awarded
- IRB International Women's Personality of the Year: Debby Hodgkinson Australia
- IRPA Special Merit Award: Kevin Mac Clancy
- IRB Development Award: 林嘉生 Lin, Chia-Sheng(Carlson Lin) Taiwan
  Mr Lin was the first person from Asian countries to receive this award, for his decades of dedication to promote rugby sport in Taiwan, and also his selfless contribution to the world rugby society.
- IRPA Try of the Year: Jaque Fourie South Africa

== 2010 ==
- IRB Player of the Year: Richie McCaw New Zealand
- IRB International Team of the Year: New Zealand
- IRB International Coach of the Year: Graham Henry New Zealand
- IRB Junior Player of the Year: Julian Savea New Zealand
- IRB International Sevens Player of the Year: Mikaele Pesamino Samoa
- Vernon Pugh Award for Distinguished Service: Jean-Claude Baqué France
- IRB Spirit of Rugby Award: Virreyes RC Argentina
- IRB Women's Personality of the Year: Carla Hohepa New Zealand
- IRB Development Award winner: Brian O'Shea Australia
- IRB Referee Award for Distinguished Service: Colin High
- IRPA Try of the Year: Chris Ashton England

== 2011 ==
- IRB Player of the Year: Thierry Dusautoir France
- IRB International Team of the Year: New Zealand
- IRB International Coach of the Year: Graham Henry New Zealand
- IRB Junior Player of the Year: George Ford England
- IRB International Sevens Player of the Year: Cecil Afrika South Africa
- Vernon Pugh Award for Distinguished Service: Jock Hobbs New Zealand
- IRB Spirit of Rugby Award: Wooden Spoon Society United Kingdom
- IRB Women's Personality of the Year: Ruth Mitchell
- IRB Development Award winner: Rookie Rugby (United States) USA
- IRB Referee Award for Distinguished Service: Keith Lawrence New Zealand
- IRPA Special Merit Award: George Smith Australia
- IRPA Try of the Year: Radike Samo Australia
- IRB Hall of Fame inductees:
  - Roger Vanderfield Australia
  - Richard Littlejohn New Zealand
  - Nicholas Shehadie Australia
  - John Kendall-Carpenter England
  - David Kirk New Zealand
  - Nick Farr-Jones Australia
  - Francois Pienaar South Africa
  - Martin Johnson England
  - John Smit South Africa
  - Brian Lochore New Zealand
  - Bob Dwyer Australia
  - Kitch Christie South Africa
  - Rod Macqueen Australia
  - Clive Woodward England
  - Jake White South Africa
  - Gareth Rees Canada
  - Agustín Pichot Argentina
  - Brian Lima Samoa
  - Jonah Lomu New Zealand

== 2012 ==
- IRB Player of the Year: Dan Carter New Zealand
- IRB International Team of the Year: New Zealand
- IRB International Coach of the Year: Steve Hansen New Zealand
- IRB International Sevens Player of the Year: Tomasi Cama New Zealand
- IRB Development Award: South African Rugby Union South Africa
- IRB Referee Award for Distinguished Service: Paul Dobson South Africa
- IRB Junior Player of the Year: Jan Serfontein South Africa
- Vernon Pugh Award for Distinguished Service: Viorel Morariu Romania
- IRB Spirit of Rugby Award: Lindsay Hilton Canada
- IRPA Try of the Year: Bryan Habana South Africa
- IRB Hall of Fame inductees:
- IRB Women’s Player of the Year: Michaela Staniford England

== 2013 ==
- IRB Player of the Year: Kieran Read New Zealand
- IRB International Team of the Year: New Zealand
- IRB International Coach of the Year: Steve Hansen New Zealand
- IRB Sevens Player of the Year: Tim Mikkelson New Zealand
- IRB Women's Sevens Player of the Year: Kayla McAlister New Zealand
- IRB Referee Award for Distinguished Service: Michel Lamoulie France
- IRPA Try of the Year: Beauden Barrett New Zealand

== 2014 ==
Note: Some of the awards for this year were presented before 19 November, when the International Rugby Board changed its name to the current World Rugby.

- World Rugby Player of the Year: Brodie Retallick New Zealand
- World Rugby Team of the Year: New Zealand
- World Rugby Coach of the Year: Steve Hansen New Zealand
- IRB Sevens Player of the Year: Samisoni Viriviri Fiji
- IRB Women's Player of the Year: Magali Harvey Canada
- IRB Women's Sevens Player of the Year: Emilee Cherry Australia
- IRB Junior Player of the Year: Handré Pollard South Africa
- IRB Referee Award for Distinguished Service: Bob Francis New Zealand
- IRPA Try of the Year: Francois Hougaard South Africa

== 2015 ==
- World Rugby Player of the Year: Dan Carter New Zealand
- World Rugby Team of the Year: New Zealand
- World Rugby Coach of the Year: Michael Cheika Australia
- World Rugby Breakthrough Player of the Year: Nehe Milner-Skudder New Zealand
- World Rugby Women's Player of the Year: Kendra Cocksedge New Zealand
- World Rugby Sevens Player of the Year: Werner Kok South Africa
- World Rugby Women's Sevens Player of the Year: Portia Woodman New Zealand
- World Rugby Referee Award: Nigel Owens Wales
- IRPA Try of the Year: Julian Savea New Zealand
- 2015 Rugby World Cup best match moment: Japan's final try and victory against South Africa
- IRPA Special Merit Award:
  - Brian O'Driscoll Ireland
  - Nathan Sharpe Australia
- Award for Character: Pakistan Rugby Union
- Vernon Pugh Award for Distinguished Service: Nigel Starmer-Smith

== 2016 ==
- World Rugby Player of the Year: Beauden Barrett New Zealand
- World Rugby Team of the Year: New Zealand
- World Rugby Coach of the Year: Steve Hansen New Zealand
- World Rugby Breakthrough Player of the Year: Maro Itoje England
- World Rugby Women's Player of the Year: Sarah Hunter England
- World Rugby Sevens Player of the Year: Seabelo Senatla South Africa
- World Rugby Women's Sevens Player of the Year: Charlotte Caslick Australia
- World Rugby Referee Award: Alhambra Nievas Spain and Rasta Rasivhenge South Africa
- IRPA Try of the Year: Jamie Heaslip Ireland
- IRPA Special Merit Award: Jean de Villiers South Africa
- Award for Character: Rugby Opens Borders Austria
- Vernon Pugh Award for Distinguished Service: Syd Millar Ireland

== 2017 ==
- World Rugby Player of the Year: Beauden Barrett New Zealand
- World Rugby Team of the Year: New Zealand
- World Rugby Coach of the Year: Eddie Jones England
- World Rugby Breakthrough Player of the Year: Rieko Ioane New Zealand
- World Rugby Women's Player of the Year: Portia Woodman New Zealand
- World Rugby Sevens Player of the Year: Perry Baker United States
- World Rugby Women's Sevens Player of the Year: Michaela Blyde New Zealand
- World Rugby Referee Award: Joy Neville Ireland
- IRPA Try of the Year: Joaquín Tuculet Argentina
- IRPA Special Merit Award: Richie McCaw New Zealand and Rachael Burford England
- Award for Character: Eduardo Oderigo Argentina
- Vernon Pugh Award for Distinguished Service: Marcel Martin France

== 2018 ==
- World Rugby Player of the Year: Johnny Sexton Ireland
- World Rugby Team of the Year: Ireland
- World Rugby Coach of the Year: Joe Schmidt Ireland
- World Rugby Breakthrough Player of the Year: Aphiwe Dyantyi South Africa
- World Rugby Women's Player of the Year: Jessy Trémoulière France
- World Rugby Sevens Player of the Year: Perry Baker United States
- World Rugby Women's Sevens Player of the Year: Michaela Blyde New Zealand
- World Rugby Referee Award: Angus Gardner Australia
- IRPA Try of the Year: Brodie Retallick New Zealand
- IRPA Special Merit Award: Stephen Moore Australia and DJ Forbes New Zealand
- Award for Character: Doddie Weir Scotland
- Vernon Pugh Award for Distinguished Service: Yoshirō Mori Japan

== 2019 ==
- World Rugby Player of the Year: Pieter-Steph du Toit South Africa
- World Rugby Team of the Year: South Africa
- World Rugby Coach of the Year: Rassie Erasmus South Africa
- World Rugby Breakthrough Player of the Year: Romain Ntamack France
- World Rugby Women's Player of the Year: Emily Scarratt England
- World Rugby Sevens Player of the Year: Jerry Tuwai Fiji
- World Rugby Women's Sevens Player of the Year: Ruby Tui New Zealand
- World Rugby Referee Award: Wayne Barnes England
- IRPA Try of the Year: TJ Perenara New Zealand
- IRPA Special Merit Award: Jamie Heaslip Ireland
- Award for Character: Kamaishi Japan
- Vernon Pugh Award for Distinguished Service: Bernard Lapasset France

== 2020 ==
Fan Awards

- Men’s 15s Player of the Decade - Richie McCaw New Zealand
- Women’s 15s Player of the Decade - Jessy Trémoulière France
- Men’s Sevens Player of the Decade - Jerry Tuwai Fiji
- Women’s Sevens Player of the Decade - Portia Woodman New Zealand
- IRP Men’s 15s Try of the Decade - Jamie Heaslip Ireland
- IRP Women’s 15s Try of the Decade - Portia Woodman New Zealand

World Rugby Awards Panel Choice

- Women’s 15s Team of the Decade
1. Rochelle Clark England
2. Fiao’o Fa'amausili New Zealand
3. Sophie Hemming England
4. Eloise Blackwell New Zealand
5. Tamara Taylor England
6. Linda Itunu New Zealand
7. Maggie Alphonsi England
8. Safi N’Diaye France
9. Kendra Cocksedge New Zealand
10. Katy Daley-McLean England
11. Portia Woodman New Zealand
12. Kelly Brazier New Zealand
13. Emily Scarratt England
14. Lydia Thompson England
15. Danielle Waterman England
- Men’s 15s Team of the Decade
1. Tendai Mtawarira South Africa
2. Bismarck du Plessis South Africa
3. Owen Franks New Zealand
4. Brodie Retallick New Zealand
5. Sam Whitelock New Zealand
6. David Pocock Australia
7. Richie McCaw New Zealand
8. Sergio Parisse Italy
9. Conor Murray Ireland
10. Dan Carter New Zealand
11. Bryan Habana South Africa
12. Ma’a Nonu New Zealand
13. Brian O’Driscoll Ireland
14. George North Wales
15. Ben Smith New Zealand

Celebrating Rugby's Heroes of COVID-19

Due to the effects of COVID-19, members of the rugby family did all they could to help.

- Maxime Mbanda
- Sarah Hunter
- Tapfuma Parirenyatwa
- New Zealand Rugby players
- Canada sevens players
- James Acker
- Springboks players
- Tess Feury
- Bakary Meité
- Shailen Tudu
- Jamie Roberts

== 2021 ==
- World Rugby Men's 15s Player of the Year: Antoine Dupont France
- World Rugby Women's 15s Player of the Year: Zoe Aldcroft England
- World Rugby Men's Sevens Player of the Year: Marcos Moneta Argentina
- World Rugby Women's Sevens Player of the Year: Anne-Cécile Ciofani France
- Vernon Pugh Award for Distinguished Service: Jacques Laurans France
- World Rugby Coach of the Year: Simon Middleton England
- World Rugby Breakthrough Player of the Year: Will Jordan New Zealand
- International Rugby Players Men's Try of the Year: Damian Penaud France
- International Rugby Players Women's Try of the Year: Émilie Boulard France
- World Rugby Referee Award: Andrew Cole Australia

=== Dream Team ===
- World Rugby Women's 15s Dream Team of the Year
1. Annaëlle DeshayesFrance
2. Agathe SochatFrance
3. Sarah Bern England
4. Safi N’Diaye France
5. Abbie Ward England
6. Zoe Aldcroft England
7. Karen Paquin Canada
8. Poppy Cleall England
9. Laure Sansus France
10. Caroline Drouin France
11. Abigail Dow England
12. Beatrice Rigoni Italy
13. Stacey Fluhler New Zealand
14. Caroline Boujard France
15. Jasmine Joyce Wales
- World Rugby Men's 15s Dream Team of the Year
1. Wyn Jones Wales
2. Malcolm Marx South Africa
3. Tadhg Furlong Ireland
4. Maro Itoje England
5. Eben Etzebeth South Africa
6. Siya Kolisi South Africa
7. Michael Hooper Australia
8. Ardie Savea New Zealand
9. Antoine Dupont France
10. Beauden Barrett New Zealand
11. Makazole Mapimpi South Africa
12. Samu Kerevi Australia
13. Lukhanyo Am South Africa
14. Will Jordan New Zealand
15. Stuart Hogg Scotland

== 2022 ==
- World Rugby Men's 15s Player of the Year: Siya Kolisi South Africa
- World Rugby Women’s 15s Player of the Year: Ruahei Demant New Zealand
- World Rugby Coach of the Year: Wayne Smith New Zealand
- World Rugby Men’s 15s Breakthrough Player of the Year: Ange Capuozzo Italy
- World Rugby Women’s Breakthrough Player of the Year: Ruby Tui New Zealand
- World Rugby Men’s Sevens Player of the Year: Terry Kennedy Ireland
- World Rugby Women’s Sevens Player of the Year: Charlotte Caslick Australia
- World Rugby Referee Award: Tappe Henning South Africa
- Vernon Pugh Award for Distinguished Service: Farah Palmer New Zealand
- International Rugby Players Special Merit Award: Bryan Habana South Africa
- International Rugby Players Men’s Try of the Year: Rodrigo Fernández Chile (vs USA on 9 July)
- International Rugby Players Women’s Try of the Year: Abby Dow England (vs Canada on 5 November)

=== Dream Team ===
- World Rugby Women's 15s Dream Team of the Year
1. Hope Rogers United States
2. Emily Tuttosi Canada
3. Sarah Bern England
4. Abbie Ward England
5. Madoussou Fall France
6. Alex Matthews England
7. Marlie Packer England
8. Sophie de Goede Canada
9. Laure Sansus France
10. Ruahei Demant New Zealand
11. Ruby Tui New Zealand
12. Theresa Fitzpatrick New Zealand
13. Emily Scarratt England
14. Portia Woodman New Zealand
15. Abby Dow England
- World Rugby Men's 15s Dream Team of the Year
1. Ellis Genge England
2. Malcolm Marx South Africa
3. Tadhg Furlong Ireland
4. Tadhg Beirne Ireland
5. Sam Whitelock New Zealand
6. Pablo Matera Argentina
7. Josh van der Flier Ireland
8. Grégory Alldritt France
9. Antoine Dupont France
10. Johnny Sexton Ireland
11. Marika Koroibete Australia
12. Damian de Allende South Africa
13. Lukhanyo Am South Africa
14. Will Jordan New Zealand
15. Freddie Steward England

== 2023 ==
- World Rugby Men's 15s Player of the Year: Ardie Savea New Zealand
- World Rugby Women's 15s Player of the Year: Marlie Packer England
- World Rugby Coach of the Year: Andy Farrell Ireland
- World Rugby Men's 15s Breakthrough Player of the Year: Mark Tele'a New Zealand
- World Rugby Women's 15s Breakthrough Player of the Year: Katelyn Vaha'akolo New Zealand
- World Rugby Men’s Sevens Player of the Year: Rodrigo Isgro Argentina
- World Rugby Women’s Sevens Player of the Year: Tyla Nathan-Wong New Zealand
- World Rugby Referee Award: David McHugh Ireland
- Vernon Pugh Award for Distinguished Service: George Nijaradze Georgia
- International Rugby Players Special Merit Award: John Smit South Africa
- International Rugby Players Men’s Try of the Year: Duhan van der Merwe Scotland (vs England on 4 February)
- International Rugby Players Women's Try of the Year: Sofia Stefan Italy (vs Ireland on 15 April)

=== Dream Team ===
- World Rugby Women's 15s Dream Team of the Year
1. Krystal Murray New Zealand
2. Lark Atkin-Davies England
3. Sarah Bern England
4. Zoe Aldcroft England
5. Maia Roos New Zealand
6. Alex Matthews England
7. Marlie Packer England
8. Liana Mikaele-Tu'u New Zealand
9. Pauline Bourdon Sansus France
10. Ruahei Demant New Zealand
11. Abigail Dow England
12. Gabrielle Vernier France
13. Amy du Plessis New Zealand
14. Ruby Tui New Zealand
15. Ellie Kildunne England
- World Rugby Men's 15s Dream Team of the Year
1. Cyril Baille France
2. Dan Sheehan Ireland
3. Tadhg Furlong Ireland
4. Eben Etzebeth South Africa
5. Scott Barrett New Zealand
6. Caelan Doris Ireland
7. Charles Ollivon France
8. Ardie Savea New Zealand
9. Antoine Dupont France
10. Richie Mo'unga New Zealand
11. Will Jordan New Zealand
12. Bundee Aki Ireland
13. Garry Ringrose Ireland
14. Damian Penaud France
15. Thomas Ramos France

== 2024 ==
- World Rugby Men's 15s Player of the Year: Pieter-Steph du Toit South Africa
- World Rugby Women's 15s Player of the Year: Ellie Kildunne England
- World Rugby Coach of the Year: Jérôme Daret France
- World Rugby Men's 15s Breakthrough Player of the Year: Wallace Sititi New Zealand
- World Rugby Women's 15s Breakthrough Player of the Year: Erin King Ireland
- World Rugby Men’s Sevens Player of the Year: Antoine Dupont France
- World Rugby Women’s Sevens Player of the Year: Maddison Levi Australia
- International Rugby Players Special Merit Award: Vickii Cornborough England
- International Rugby Players Men’s Try of the Year: Nolann Le Garrec France (vs England on 17 March)
- International Rugby Players Women’s Try of the Year: Marine Ménager France (vs Canada on 29 September)

=== Dream Teams ===
==== XVs ====
- World Rugby Women's 15s Dream Team of the Year
1. Hope Rogers United States
2. Georgia Ponsonby New Zealand
3. Maud Muir England
4. Zoe Aldcroft England
5. Laetitia Royer Canada
6. Aoife Wafer Ireland
7. Sophie de Goede Canada
8. Alex Matthews England
9. Pauline Bourdon Sansus France
10. Holly Aitchison England
11. Katelyn Vaha'akolo New Zealand
12. Alex Tessier Canada
13. Sylvia Brunt New Zealand
14. Abby Dow England
15. Ellie Kildunne England
- World Rugby Men's 15s Dream Team of the Year
1. Ox Nche South Africa
2. Malcolm Marx South Africa
3. Tyrel Lomax New Zealand
4. Eben Etzebeth South Africa
5. Tadhg Beirne Ireland
6. Pablo Matera Argentina
7. Pieter-Steph du Toit South Africa
8. Caelan Doris Ireland
9. Jamison Gibson-Park Ireland
10. Damian McKenzie New Zealand
11. James Lowe Ireland
12. Damian de Allende South Africa
13. Jesse Kriel South Africa
14. Cheslin Kolbe South Africa
15. Will Jordan New Zealand

==== Sevens ====
- World Rugby Women's Sevens Dream Team of the Year
1. Olivia Apps Canada
2. Michaela Blyde New Zealand
3. Kristi Kirshe United States
4. Maddison Levi Australia
5. Ilona Maher United States
6. Jorja Miller New Zealand
7. Séraphine Okemba France
- World Rugby Men's Sevens Dream Team of the Year
1. Selvyn Davids South Africa
2. Antoine Dupont France
3. Aaron Grandidier-Nkanang France
4. Terry Kennedy Ireland
5. Nathan Lawson Australia
6. Ponepati Loganimasi Fiji
7. Matías Osadczuk Argentina

== 2025 ==
- World Rugby Men's 15s Player of the Year: Malcolm Marx South Africa
- World Rugby Women's 15s Player of the Year: Sophie de Goede Canada
- World Rugby Coach of the Year: John Mitchell England Women
- World Rugby Men's 15s Breakthrough Player of the Year: Fabian Holland New Zealand
- World Rugby Women's 15s Breakthrough Player of the Year: Braxton Sorensen-McGee New Zealand
- World Rugby Men’s Sevens Player of the Year: Luciano González Argentina
- World Rugby Women’s Sevens Player of the Year: Jorja Miller New Zealand
- International Rugby Players Special Merit Award: Dan Carter New Zealand
- International Rugby Players Men’s Try of the Year: Santiago Pedrero Chile (vs Samoa on 20 September)
- International Rugby Players Women’s Try of the Year: Maia Joseph New Zealand (vs Ireland on 7 September)
- World Rugby Referee Award: Hollie Davidson Scotland

=== Dream Teams ===
==== XVs ====
- Women's 15s Dream Team of the Year
1. Hannah Botterman England
2. Emily Tuttosi Canada
3. Maud Muir England
4. Sophie de Goede Canada
5. Abbie Ward England
6. Alex Matthews England
7. Jorja Miller New Zealand
8. Kaipo Olsen-Baker New Zealand
9. Justine Pelletier Canada
10. Zoe Harrison England
11. Joanna Grisez France
12. Sylvia Brunt New Zealand
13. Megan Jones England
14. Braxton Sorensen-McGee New Zealand
15. Ellie Kildunne England
- Men's 15s Dream Team of the Year
1. Ox Nché South Africa
2. Malcolm Marx South Africa
3. Thomas du Toit South Africa
4. Maro Itoje England
5. Tadhg Beirne Ireland
6. Pieter-Steph du Toit South Africa
7. Tom Curry England
8. Harry Wilson Australia
9. Cam Roigard New Zealand
10. Sacha Feinberg-Mngomezulu South Africa
11. Louis Bielle-Biarrey France
12. Len Ikitau Australia
13. Huw Jones Scotland
14. Cheslin Kolbe South Africa
15. Will Jordan New Zealand

==== Sevens ====
- Women's 7s Dream Team of the Year
1. Michaela Brake New Zealand
2. Thalia Costa Brazil
3. Marin Kajiki Japan
4. Maddison Levi Australia
5. Jorja Miller New Zealand
6. Isabella Nasser Australia
7. Risi Pouri-Lane New Zealand
- Men's 7s Dream Team of the Year
1. Harry Glover Great Britain
2. Luciano González Argentina
3. Manu Moreno Spain
4. Marcos Moneta Argentina
5. Joji Nasova Fiji
6. Pol Pla Spain
7. Paulin Riva France
