= World Rugby Men's Sevens Rookie of the Year =

- Awarded for: Best Men's Sevens Rookie of the Year
- Date: 2014; 12 years ago
- Presented by: World Rugby
- First award: 2014
- Currently held by: (New Zealand) Kele Lasaqa (2026)
- Website: World Rugby Awards

The World Rugby Sevens Rookie of the Year is awarded by World Rugby each year. It was first awarded in 2014. The award is based in large part on the player's performance over the course of the World Rugby Sevens Series, along with other Sevens tournaments during the year.

== List of winners ==
Year	Image	Winner	Country	Other nominees	Ref(s)
2014	—N/a	Ambrose Curtis	New Zealand	(New Zealand) Akira Ioane (Australia) Pama Fou (South Africa) Seabelo Senatla	
2015		Jerry Tuwai	Fiji	(Canada) Connor Braid (South Africa) Ruhan Nel (Argentina) Juan Pablo Estelles	
2016		Henry Hutchison	Australia	(Argentina) Bautista Ezcurra (Samoa) Phoenix Hunapo-Nofoa (New Zealand) Regan Ware	
2017		Matías Osadczuk	Argentina	(Fiji) Kalione Nasoko (New Zealand) Vilimoni Koroi	
2018		Eroni Sau	Fiji	(Fiji) Alosio Naduva (Australia) Ben O'Donnell	
2019		Meli Derenalagi	Fiji	(Fiji) Vilimoni Botitu (Fiji) Aminiasi Tuimaba	
2020	No award				
2021		Marcos Moneta	Argentina	(South Africa) Ronald Brown (Australia) Samu Kerevi	
2022	—N/a	Corey Toole	Australia	(Australia) Henry Patterson (Australia) Dietrich Roache	
2023	—N/a	Ricardo Duarttee	South Africa	(France) Théo Forner (Argentina) Joaquín Pellandini	
2024	Antoine Dupont in 2023	Antoine Dupont	France	(Australia) Henry Palmer (South Africa) Quewin Nortje	
2025	—N/a	Enahemo Artaud	France	(Fiji) George Bose (Australia) Aden Ekanayake	
2026	—N/a	Kele Lasaqa	New Zealand	(Australia) Harry Wilson (United Kingdom) Finley Lloyd-Gilmour	

== Other World Rugby Awards ==
- World Rugby Men's 15s Player of the Year
- World Rugby Men's Sevens Player of the Year
- World Rugby Team of the Year
- World Rugby Coach of the Year
- World Rugby Junior Player of the Year
- World Rugby Women’s 15s Player of the Year
- World Rugby Women's Sevens Player of the Year
- IRB Spirit of Rugby Award
- Vernon Pugh Award for Distinguished Service
- World Rugby Referee Award
- IRB Development Award
- IRB Chairman's Award

== See also ==
- World Rugby Sevens Series § Player awards by season
