= World Rugby Men's Sevens Player of the Year =

- Awarded for: Best Men's Sevens Player of the Year
- Date: 2004; 22 years ago
- Presented by: World Rugby
- First award: 2004
- Currently held by: (South Africa) Tristan Leyds (2026)
- Website: World Rugby Awards

The World Rugby Sevens Player of the Year is awarded by World Rugby each year. It was first awarded in 2004. The award is based in large part on the player’s performance over the course of the World Rugby Sevens Series, along with other Sevens tournaments during the year.

From 2004 until 2008 the award was called the IRB International Sevens Player of the Year. From 2009 until 2013, it was the IRB Sevens Player of the Year. Since 2014, following the International Rugby Board becoming World Rugby, the award has been titled the World Rugby Sevens Player of the Year.

Antoine Dupont has won the World Rugby Men's Sevens Player of the Year award in 2024 and the World Rugby Men's 15s Player of the Year in 2021. He is the first and only rugby player ever to have won both the Men’s Sevens and the Men’s 15s World Rugby Player of the Year awards in one's career.

== List of winners ==
Year	Image	Winner	Country	Other nominees	Ref(s)
2004	Simon Amor in 2005	Simon Amor	England	(England) Ben Gollings (Argentina) Lucio Lopez Fleming	
2005	Orene Ai'i in 2011	Orene Ai'i	New Zealand	(New Zealand) Amasio Valence (Fiji) Neumi Nanuku	
2006	Uale Mai in 2011	Uale Mai	Samoa	(South Africa) Stefan Basson (England) Mathew Tait	
2007	—N/a	Afeleke Pelenise	New Zealand	(New Zealand) DJ Forbes (Samoa) Mikaele Pesamino	
2008	DJ Forbes in 2017	DJ Forbes	New Zealand	(Samoa) Uale Mai (South Africa) Fabian Juries	
2009	—N/a	Ollie Phillips	England	(Kenya) Collins Injera (Kenya) H. Kayange (South Africa) Renfred Dazel	
2010	—N/a	Mikaele Pesamino	Samoa	(Samoa) Lolo Lui (Samoa) Alafoti Fa'osiliva (England) Ben Gollings	
2011	Cecil Afrika in 2012	Cecil Afrika	South Africa	(New Zealand) Tomasi Cama Jr. (New Zealand) Tim Mikkelson	
2012	Tomasi Cama in 2022	Tomasi Cama	New Zealand	(New Zealand) Frank Halai (England) Mathew Turner	
2013	Tim Mikkelson in 2009	Tim Mikkelson	New Zealand		
2014	Samisoni Viriviri in 2014	Samisoni Viriviri	Fiji	(New Zealand) Tim Mikkelson (South Africa) Kyle Brown (England) Tom Mitchell	
2015	Werner Kok in 2022	Werner Kok	South Africa	(South Africa) Seabelo Senatla (Fiji) Semi Kunatani	
2016	—N/a	Seabelo Senatla	South Africa	(Fiji) Osea Kolinisau (France) Virimi Vakatawa	
2017		Perry Baker	United States	(South Africa) Rosko Specman (Fiji) Jerry Tuwai	
2018		Perry Baker	United States	(Australia) Ben O'Donnell (Fiji) Jerry Tuwai	
2019		Jerry Tuwai	Fiji	(United States) Stephen Tomasin (United States) Folau Niua	
2020	No award				
2021		Marcos Moneta	Argentina	(Fiji) Napolioni Bolaca (New Zealand) Scott Curry (Fiji) Jiuta Wainiqolo	
2022		Terry Kennedy	Ireland	(Australia) Nick Malouf (Fiji) Kaminieli Rasaku (Australia) Corey Toole	
2023		Rodrigo Isgró	Argentina	(New Zealand) Leroy Carter (Argentina) Marcos Moneta (New Zealand) Akuila Rokolisoa	
2024	Antoine Dupont in 2023	Antoine Dupont	France	(France) Aaron Grandidier-Nkanang (Ireland) Terry Kennedy	
2025		Luciano González	Argentina	(France) Aaron Grandidier-Nkanang (Ireland) Terry Kennedy	
2026	—N/a	Tristan Leyds	South Africa	(Australia) Henry Hutchison (Fiji) Vuiviawa Naduvalo	

=== Winners with multiple nominations ===
Player	Wins	Nominations
(United States) Perry Baker	2 (2017, 2018)	2 (2017, 2018)
(Fiji) Jerry Tuwai	1 (2019)	3 (2017, 2018, 2019)
(New Zealand) Tim Mikkelson	1 (2013)	3 (2011, 2013, 2014)
(Ireland) Terry Kennedy	1 (2022)	3 (2022, 2024, 2025)
(South Africa) Seabelo Senatla	1 (2016)	2 (2015, 2016)
(New Zealand) Tomasi Cama Jr.	1 (2012)	2 (2011, 2012)
(Samoa) Mikaele Pesamino	1 (2010)	2 (2007, 2010)
(New Zealand) DJ Forbes	1 (2008)	2 (2007, 2008)
(Samoa) Uale Mai	1 (2006)	2 (2006, 2008)
(Argentina) Marcos Moneta	1 (2021)	2 (2021, 2023)

== Explanatory notes ==
This section provides additional detail to the table above regarding the team and player accomplishments that season that helped the player win the Sevens Player of the Year award.

- 2010: Samoa won its first ever World Series title
- 2013: Tim Mikkelson was recognized as the Player of the Tournament at the 2013 Rugby World Cup Sevens.
- 2014: Samisoni Viriviri led all players in tries scored with 52.
- 2015: Werner Kok led all players in tackles made.
- 2016: Seabelo Senatla led all players in tries scored with 66.
- 2017: Perry Baker led the World Series in several statistical categories — 57 tries, 76 clean breaks, and 285 points.
- 2018: Baker was the World Series leader in tries with 37 before missing the last three rounds to injury, returning to help the USA to its best-ever finish of sixth at the 2018 Rugby World Cup Sevens.
- 2019: Jerry Tuwai was fifth in clean breaks with 34.
- 2021: Marcos Moneta lead Argentina to their first Rugby Bronze Olympic Medal and he ended being the tryman at that tournament. At the olympics he scored two tries in the memorable match between Argentina and South Africa where Gaston Revol was expelled and Argentina where playing with 6 players.
- 2022: Terry Kennedy led Ireland to a bronze medal at the Rugby World Cup Sevens.

== Other World Rugby Awards ==
- World Rugby Men's 15s Player of the Year
- World Rugby Team of the Year
- World Rugby Coach of the Year
- World Rugby Junior Player of the Year
- World Rugby Women’s 15s Player of the Year
- World Rugby Women's Sevens Player of the Year
- IRB Spirit of Rugby Award
- Vernon Pugh Award for Distinguished Service
- World Rugby Referee Award
- IRB Development Award
- IRB Chairman's Award

== See also ==
- World Rugby Sevens Series § Player awards by season
