= World Rugby Women's Sevens Dream Team of the Year =

Women's 7s Dream Team of the Year
- Date: 2024; 2 years ago
- Presented by: World Rugby
- First award: 2024

World Rugby Women's Sevens Dream Team of the Year was awarded for the first time at the World Rugby Awards which took place in Monaco on 24 November 2024.

== Dream Teams ==
Year	Team	Refs
2024	1. Olivia Apps Canada; 2. Michaela Blyde New Zealand; 3. Kristi Kirshe United States; 4. Maddison Levi Australia; 5. Ilona Maher United States; 6. Jorja Miller New Zealand; 7. Séraphine Okemba France	
2025	1. Michaela Brake New Zealand; 2. Thalia Costa Brazil; 3. Marin Kajiki Japan; 4. Maddison Levi Australia; 5. Jorja Miller New Zealand; 6. Isabella Nasser Australia; 7. Risi Pouri-Lane New Zealand	
