= Erin King =

Ireland international rugby union player

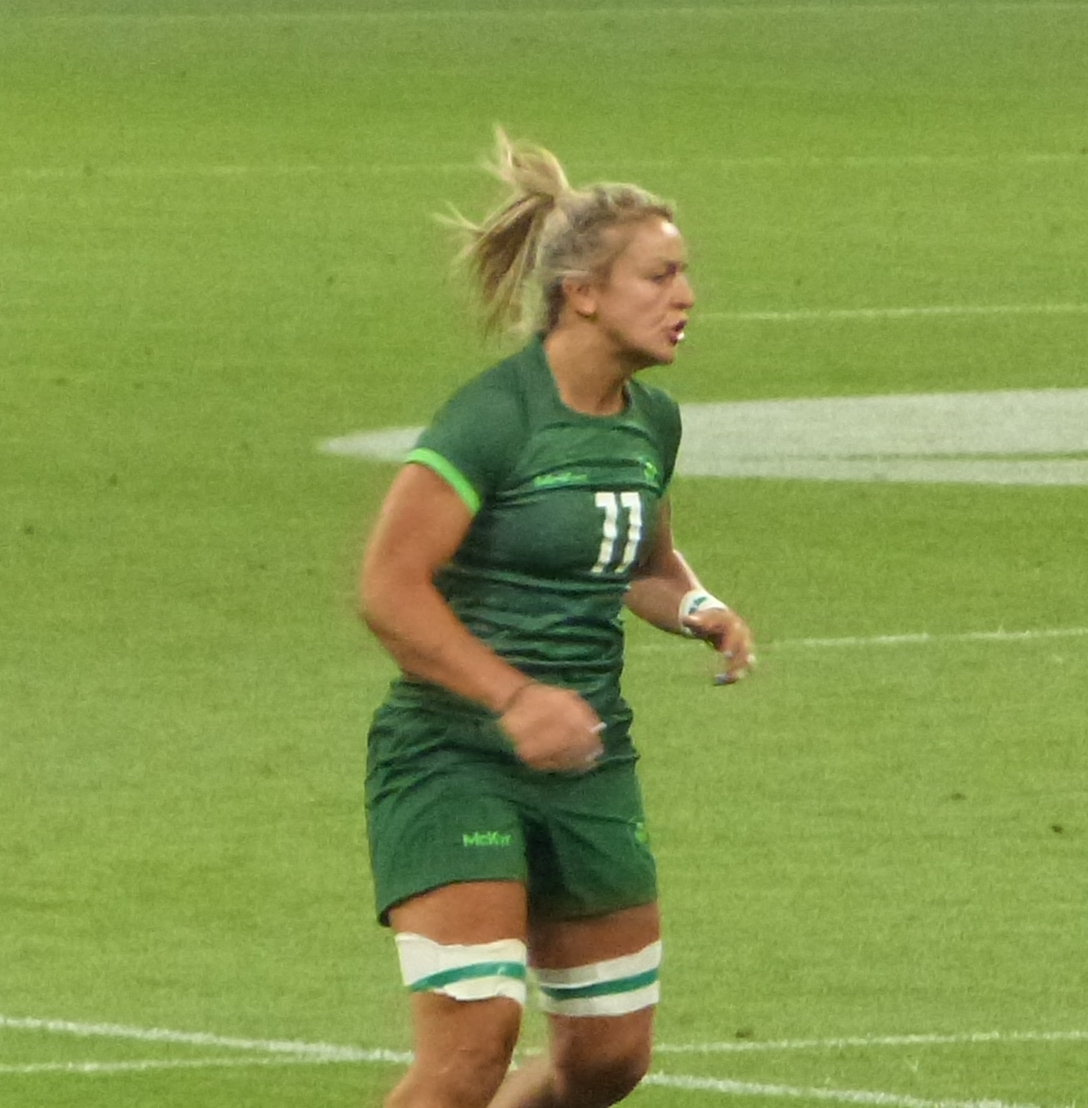
- King with Ireland at the 2024 Olympics
- Born: 21 October 2003 (age 23) Sydney, Australia
- Height: 170 cm (5 ft 7 in)
- Weight: 76 kg (168 lb; 12 st 0 lb)

Rugby union career
- Position: Back Row
Youth career
- Leinster U18
Senior career
Years	Team	Apps	(Points)
	Old Belvedere RFC		(0)
International career
Years	Team	Apps	(Points)
2024–	Ireland	4	(0)
National sevens team
Years	Team		Comps
2021–	Ireland		

Erin King (born 21 October 2003) is an Irish Rugby Union player who plays for the Ireland women's national rugby union team and the Irish Rugby Sevens team. In 2024, she was named World Rugby Women's 15s Breakthrough Player of the Year at the World Rugby Awards. She represented Ireland at the 2024 Summer Olympics.

== Early life ==
King was born in Sydney, Australia to English parents. She is of Irish descent through her maternal grandfather. She has four brothers - Daniel, Matty, Connor, and Liam. She also lived with her family in Dubai and Doha. The family moved back to Wicklow in Ireland for her teenage years. King played youths rugby at Naas RFC and represented Leinster and Ireland U18 rugby union sides. She plays her club rugby for Old Belvedere RFC.

== Rugby career ==
King made her debut for the Ireland sevens team at the Dubai Sevens in December 2021, after being identified as a Player of National Interest at the age of 17 and joining the Ireland Sevens program in January 2021.

She played an important role in the Irish women's team becoming the first ever to win a World Series silver medal in February 2022, in Spain. She scored her first tries for Ireland in a 22–21 win against Canada at the French HSBC World Rugby Sevens Series event in Toulouse in May 2022. She was named in the Ireland squad for the 2022 Rugby World Cup Sevens – Women's tournament held in Cape Town, South Africa in September 2022.

She represented Ireland at the 2024 Summer Olympics in Paris. She then made her international fifteens debut for Ireland against Australia on 14 September 2024 at Kingspan Stadium in Belfast. Playing for the Ireland 15-a-side team she scored twice as they beat New Zealand at the WXV1 competition in Canada in September 2024. In November 2024, she was named World Rugby Women's 15s Breakthrough Player of the Year at the World Rugby Awards.

She was named in Ireland's side for the 2025 Six Nations Championship in March. A knee injury suffered in April 2025 in the Six Nations against England ruled her out of the 2025 World Cup.

In January 2026, King returned to fitness from her injury and was named as the new captain of the Ireland women's rugby team. She continued in the role for the 2026 Six Nations Championship campaign.
