= World Rugby Women's 15s Breakthrough Player of the Year =

- Awarded for: Women's 15s Breakthrough Player of the Year
- Presented by: World Rugby
- First award: 2022
- Currently held by: (New Zealand) Braxton Sorensen-McGee (2025)
- Website: World Rugby Awards

The World Rugby Women's 15s Breakthrough Player of the Year is an award given annually by World Rugby at the World Rugby Awards. It is awarded to 15s players who have played no more than one year of international rugby. Voting is assessed on international test matches only. The award was first presented in 2022 in partnership with Tudor and was won by New Zealand's Ruby Tui.

== Winner and nominees ==
Year	Image	Winning player	Other nominees	Ref(s)
2022	Ruby Tui in 2022	(New Zealand) Ruby Tui	(England) Maud Muir (Fiji) Vitalina Naikore (New Zealand) Maiakawanakaulani Roos	
2023	—N/a	(New Zealand) Katelyn Vaha'akolo	(France) Carla Arbez (Scotland) Francesca McGhie (New Zealand) Mererangi Paul	
2024	Erin King at the 2024 Olympics	(Ireland) Erin King	(England) Maddie Feaunati (Australia) Caitlyn Halse (New Zealand) Hannah King	
2025		(New Zealand) Braxton Sorensen-McGee	(New Zealand) Jorja Miller (Fiji) Josifini Neihamu	
2026	—N/a	(New Zealand) Elinor-Plum King	(France) Pauline Barrat (Australia) Amelia Whitaker (United States) Bella Vogel	
