= International Rugby Players Men's Try of the Year =

IRP Men's Try of the Year
- Awarded for: Best Try of the Year
- Date: 2007; 19 years ago
- Presented by: World Rugby
- First award: 2007
- Currently held by: (Chile) Santiago Pedrero (2025)
- Website: World Rugby Awards

The IRP Men's Try of the Year is an accolade awarded annually by World Rugby at the World Rugby Awards. The International Rugby Players (IRP) – formerly International Rugby Players Association – select the nominees from which the winner is decided by a public vote. As of 2017, the IRPA selection panel comprises Isaac Boss (representing Rugby Players Ireland), Andries Pretorius (Welsh Rugby Players Association), Hale T-Pole (Pacific Players Association) and Stefan Terblanche (South African Rugby Players Association).

The inaugural winner of the IRPA Try of the Year trophy in 2007 was the Zimbabwean-born United States wing Takudzwa Ngwenya. His try, considered by the Bleacher Report as one of the greatest in history, completed a counter-attack for the United States against South Africa (also known as the Springboks) in the group stage of the 2007 Rugby World Cup. Receiving the ball on the halfway line, Ngwenya outpaced Bryan Habana, then considered to be the fastest player in international rugby, to score. Brian O'Driscoll received the award in 2008 for Ireland's team try scored during their 18–12 defeat against Australia. Starting from a lineout inside their own 22, Ireland caught their own kick as they moved up to the halfway line. An exchange of passes culminated with O'Driscoll receiving the ball 9 metres (10 yd) out before scoring. The 2009 award went to South Africa's Jaque Fourie who scored the decisive try in a game described as "one of the great matches of all time" against the British and Irish Lions. Fourie's try in the 74th minute levelled the scores with Morné Steyn kicking a penalty with the final act of the match to take the win for South Africa.

England's Chris Ashton won the IRPA Try of the Year award in 2010. Having already scored against Australia in the first half, Ashton ran 90 metres (98 yd) to score his second, completed with a "swan dive" as he crossed the tryline in what has been described as "one of the great Twickenham scores". The press dubbed the celebratory dive the "Ash-Splash". The 2011 award was presented to Australia's Radike Samo for his 60 metres (66 yd) solo effort against New Zealand (also known as the All Blacks), described by The Sydney Morning Herald as "one of the great forward tries". Bryan Habana became the second South African to win the award for his try against the All Blacks in 2012. Running between two defending players and chipping the ball over a third, Habana slid in to score in the Springboks' 21–11 defeat in the 2012 Rugby Championship. The 2013 recipient of the award was New Zealand's Beauden Barrett who finished off an All Black move against France which had started just outside their own tryline.

Francois Hougaard's try for South Africa against New Zealand earned him the 2014 IRPA Try of the Year award. He completed a move after eight passes which had started on the Springbok tryline, and helped consign the All Blacks to their first defeat in almost two years. All Black Julian Savea won the award in 2015 with one of three tries he scored in New Zealand's comprehensive 62–13 defeat over France in the 2015 Rugby World Cup. Robert Kitson of The Observer described the award-winning try as a "stunner that took him past and through [Louis] Picamoles, Brice Dulin and Rabah Slimani in a manner reminiscent of Lomu's flattening of Mike Catt in Cape Town in 1995". The winner of the 2016 award was Ireland's Jamie Heaslip who finished off a team move which started inside their own 22 against Italy during the 2016 Six Nations Championship. The 2017 IRPA Try of the Year was awarded to Argentina's Joaquín Tuculet for his try, completing a team effort which started deep inside his half, against England in San Juan.

== Winners ==
Winners of the IRP Try of the Year
| Year | Image | Player | Team | Match | Video | Ref |
|---|---|---|---|---|---|---|
| 2007 | Takudzwa Ngwenya in 2010 | Takudzwa Ngwenya | United States | United States vs South Africa | Video | |
| 2008 | Brian O'Driscoll in 2010 | Brian O'Driscoll | Ireland | Australia vs Ireland | Video | |
| 2009 | Jacque Fourie in 2007 | Jaque Fourie | South Africa | South Africa vs British and Irish Lions | Video | |
| 2010 | Chris Ashton in 2011 | Chris Ashton | England | England vs Australia | Video | |
| 2011 | Radike Samo in 2011 | Radike Samo | Australia | Australia vs New Zealand | Video | |
| 2012 | Bryan Habana in 2006 | Bryan Habana | South Africa | South Africa vs New Zealand | Video | |
| 2013 | Beauden Barrett in 2014 | Beauden Barrett | New Zealand | New Zealand vs France | Video | |
| 2014 | – | Francois Hougaard | South Africa | South Africa vs New Zealand | Video | |
| 2015 | Julia Savea in 2015 | Julian Savea | New Zealand | New Zealand vs France | Video | |
| 2016 | Jamie Heaslip in 2015 | Jamie Heaslip | Ireland | Ireland vs Italy | Video | |
| 2017 | Joaquin Tuculet in 2015 | Joaquín Tuculet | Argentina | Argentina vs England | Video | |
| 2018 | | Brodie Retallick | New Zealand | Australia vs New Zealand | Video | |
| 2019 | | TJ Perenara | New Zealand | New Zealand vs Namibia | Video | |
| 2021 | | Damian Penaud | France | France vs Scotland | Video | |
| 2022 | Rodrigo Fernández in 2023 | Rodrigo Fernández | Chile | Chile v USA | Video | |
| 2023 | | Duhan van der Merwe | Scotland | Scotland v England | Video | |
| 2024 | Le Garrec playing for Racing in 2020 | Nolann Le Garrec | France | France vs England | Video | |
| 2025 | | Santiago Pedrero | Chile | Chile vs Samoa | Video | |
