= International Rugby Players Special Merit Award =

IRP Special Merit Award
- Date: 2007; 19 years ago
- Presented by: World Rugby
- First award: 2007
- Currently held by: (New Zealand) Dan Carter (2025)

The International Rugby Players Special Merit Award is presented at the World Rugby Awards by World Rugby. The award is presented to a player by fellow players in recognition of their outstanding contribution to the professional game on and off the field. The recipient of the award is selected by the International Rugby Players organization.

== Recipients ==
Year	Recipients	Refs
2007	(France) Fabien Pelous	
2008	(Argentina) Agustín Pichot	
2011	(Australia) George Smith	
2015	(Republic of Ireland) Brian O'Driscoll (Australia) Nathan Sharpe	
2016	(South Africa) Jean de Villiers	
2017	(New Zealand) Richie McCaw (England) Rachael Burford	
2018	(New Zealand) DJ Forbes (Australia) Stephen Moore	
2019	(Republic of Ireland) Jamie Heaslip	
2022	(South Africa) Bryan Habana	
2023	(South Africa) John Smit	
2024	(England) Vickii Cornborough	
2025	(New Zealand) Dan Carter	
