= World Rugby Men's 15s Dream Team of the Year =

Men's 15s Dream Team of the Year
- Date: 2021; 5 years ago
- Presented by: World Rugby
- First award: 2021

World Rugby Men's 15s Dream Team of the Year was first presented in 2021 by World Rugby. The award is open to all men's 15s players who have played international test matches in the voting year. They are voted by a panel of international past players and coaches, World Rugby Hall of Fame inductees and the rugby media.

The 2021 panel was composed of Maggie Alphonsi (ENG), Fiona Coghlan (IRE), Thierry Dusautoir (FRA), George Gregan (AUS), Richie McCaw (NZL), Brian O'Driscoll (IRE), Melodie Robinson (NZL), John Smit (RSA), and the 2003 Coach of the Year, Sir Clive Woodward (ENG). In 2021, England, France, Ireland, Scotland and Wales each had one player selected; Australia had two, New Zealand had three, and South Africa had the majority of five. Four of the Men's 15s Player of the Year nominees were included. The players selected had a combined 850 caps.

As of 2025, Will Jordan is the only player to have been selected for all five World Rugby Dream Teams of the Year.

== Dream Team ==
Year	Team	Refs
2021	1. (Wales) Wyn Jones; 2. (South Africa) Malcolm Marx; 3. (Ireland) Tadhg Furlong; 4. (England) Maro Itoje; 5. (South Africa) Eben Etzebeth; 6. (South Africa) Siya Kolisi; 7. (Australia) Michael Hooper; 8. (New Zealand) Ardie Savea; 9. (France) Antoine Dupont; 10. (New Zealand) Beauden Barrett; 11. (South Africa) Makazole Mapimpi; 12. (Australia) Samu Kerevi; 13. (South Africa) Lukhanyo Am; 14. (New Zealand) Will Jordan; 15. (Scotland) Stuart Hogg	
2022	1. (England) Ellis Genge; 2. (South Africa) Malcolm Marx; 3. (Ireland) Tadhg Furlong; 4. (Ireland) Tadhg Beirne; 5. (New Zealand) Sam Whitelock; 6. (Argentina) Pablo Matera; 7. (Ireland) Josh van der Flier; 8. (France) Grégory Alldritt; 9. (France) Antoine Dupont; 10. (Ireland) Johnny Sexton; 11. (Australia) Marika Koroibete; 12. (South Africa) Damian de Allende; 13. (South Africa) Lukhanyo Am; 14. (New Zealand) Will Jordan; 15. (England) Freddie Steward	
2023	1. (France) Cyril Baille; 2. (Ireland) Dan Sheehan; 3. (Ireland) Tadhg Furlong; 4. (South Africa) Eben Etzebeth; 5. (New Zealand) Scott Barrett; 6. (Ireland) Caelan Doris; 7. (France) Charles Ollivon; 8. (New Zealand) Ardie Savea; 9. (France) Antoine Dupont; 10. (New Zealand) Richie Mo'unga; 11. (New Zealand) Will Jordan; 12. (Ireland) Bundee Aki; 13. (Ireland) Garry Ringrose; 14. (France) Damian Penaud; 15. (France) Thomas Ramos	
2024	1. (South Africa) Ox Nché; 2. (South Africa) Malcolm Marx; 3. (New Zealand) Tyrel Lomax; 4. (South Africa) Eben Etzebeth; 5. (Ireland) Tadhg Beirne; 6. (Argentina) Pablo Matera; 7. (South Africa) Pieter-Steph du Toit; 8. (Ireland) Caelan Doris; 9. (Ireland) Jamison Gibson-Park; 10. (New Zealand) Damian McKenzie; 11. (Ireland) James Lowe; 12. (South Africa) Damian de Allende; 13. (South Africa) Jesse Kriel; 14. (South Africa) Cheslin Kolbe; 15. (New Zealand) Will Jordan	
2025	1. (South Africa) Ox Nché; 2. (South Africa) Malcolm Marx; 3. (South Africa) Thomas du Toit; 4. (England) Maro Itoje; 5. (Ireland) Tadhg Beirne; 6. (South Africa) Pieter-Steph du Toit; 7. (England) Tom Curry; 8. (Australia) Harry Wilson; 9. (New Zealand) Cam Roigard; 10. (South Africa) Sacha Feinberg-Mngomezulu; 11. (France) Louis Bielle-Biarrey; 12. (Australia) Len Ikitau; 13. (Scotland) Huw Jones; 14. (South Africa) Cheslin Kolbe; 15. (New Zealand) Will Jordan	

== Statistics ==
Selections by Player
5	(New Zealand) Will Jordan
4	(South Africa) Malcolm Marx
3	(Ireland) Tadhg Beirne
3	(France) Antoine Dupont
3	(South Africa) Eben Etzebeth
3	(Ireland) Tadhg Furlong
2	(South Africa) Lukhanyo Am
2	(South Africa) Damian de Allende
2	(Ireland) Caelan Doris
2	(South Africa) Pieter-Steph du Toit
2	(England) Maro Itoje
2	(South Africa) Cheslin Kolbe
2	(Argentina) Pablo Matera
2	(South Africa) Ox Nché
2	(New Zealand) Ardie Savea

Selections by Country
22	South Africa
15	Ireland
14	New Zealand
9	France
5	Australia
5	England
2	Argentina
2	Scotland
1	Wales
