= World Rugby Men's 15s Breakthrough Player of the Year =

- Awarded for: Men's 15s Breakthrough Player of the Year
- Date: 2015; 11 years ago
- Presented by: World Rugby
- First award: 2015
- Currently held by: (New Zealand) Fabian Holland (2025)
- Website: World Rugby Awards

The World Rugby Men's 15s Breakthrough Player of the Year is an award given annually by World Rugby at the World Rugby Awards. The award is given to 15s players who have played no more than one year of international rugby. Voting is assessed on international test matches only.

== Winner & Nominees ==
Year	Image	Winner	Nominees	Ref(s)
2015	Nehe Milner-Skudder in 2015	(New Zealand) Nehe Milner-Skudder	(Scotland) Mark Bennett (Georgia (country)) Vasil Lobzhanidze	
2016	Maro Itoje in 2015	(England) Maro Itoje	(New Zealand) Anton Lienert-Brown (New Zealand) Ardie Savea	
2017	Rieko Ioane in 2015	(New Zealand) Rieko Ioane	(Argentina) Emiliano Boffelli (France) Damian Penaud	
2018	N/A	(South Africa) Aphiwe Dyantyi	(Ireland) Jordan Larmour (New Zealand) Karl Tu'inukuafe	
2019	Romain Ntamack in 2019	(France) Romain Ntamack	(England) Joe Cokanasiga (South Africa) Herschel Jantjies	
2020	Not Awarded			
2021	Will Jordan in 2024	(New Zealand) Will Jordan	(Australia) Andrew Kellaway (Wales) Louis Rees-Zammit (England) Marcus Smith	
2022	Ange Capuozzo in 2023	(Italy) Ange Capuozzo	(England) Henry Arundell (Ireland) Mack Hansen (Ireland) Dan Sheehan	
2023	Mark Tele'a in 2024	(New Zealand) Mark Tele'a	(France) Louis Bielle-Biarrey (South Africa) Manie Libbok (New Zealand) Tamaiti Williams	
2024		(New Zealand) Wallace Sititi	(South Africa) Sacha Feinberg-Mngomezulu (England) Immanuel Feyi-Waboso (Ireland) Jamie Osborne	
2025	N/A	(New Zealand) Fabian Holland	(South Africa) Ethan Hooker (England) Henry Pollock (Australia) Joseph-Aukuso Sua'ali'i	
