= IRB Spirit of Rugby Award =

- Presented by: IRB
- First award: 2001
- Final award: 2012

The IRB Spirit of Rugby Award was an award that was previously presented by the IRB at their annual IRB Awards.

== Recipients ==
Year	Recipients	Refs
2001	(India) Tim Grandadge	
2002	(Uruguay) Old Christians Rugby Club	
2003	(Eswatini) Michael Collinson (Eswatini) Linda Collinson	
2004	(New Zealand) Jarrod Cunningham	
2005	(France) Jean Pierre Rives	
2006	Polly Miller	
2007	(Argentina) Nicolás Pueta	
2008	Roelien Muller; Patrick Cotter	
2009	(Italy) L'Aquila Rugby	
2010	(Argentina) Virreyes Rugby Club	
2011	(United Kingdom) Wooden Spoon Society	
2012	(Canada) Lindsay Hilton	
