= Afeleke Pelenise =

New Zealand rugby union player

- Born: Alfred Pelenise; 14 November 1982 (age 43) Christchurch
- Height: 1.85 m (6 ft 1 in)
- Weight: 99 kg (15 st 8 lb; 218 lb)

Rugby union career
- Position: Utility Back
Senior career
Years	Team	Apps	(Points)
2008–09	Castres		
2011–12	FC Grenoble		
Provincial / State sides
Years	Team	Apps	(Points)
- Tasman
National sevens team
Years	Team		Comps
2005-2008	New Zealand 7s		

Alfred Pelenise (born 14 November 1982), also known as Afeleki, is a former New Zealand rugby union player who played for the New Zealand Sevens team and Professional Rugby for Castres Olympique and FC Grenoble in France.

== Career highlights ==
- New Zealand Sevens 2005–2008
- New Zealand Under 19s 2001
- New Zealand Under 21s 2002, 2003
- Canterbury 2005, 2006
- Tasman 2007 - 2010
- Castres Olympique 2008 - 2009
- FC Grenoble 2011 - 2012
- IRB Sevens Player of the Year 2007
