= Tadhg Furlong =

Irish rugby union player (born 1992)

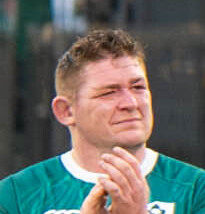
- Furlong in March 2025
- Full name: Tadhg Vincent Anthony Furlong
- Born: 14 November 1992 (age 34) County Wexford, Ireland
- Height: 1.83 m (6 ft 0 in)
- Weight: 125 kg (276 lb; 19 st 10 lb)
- School: Good Counsel College
- University: Dublin City University

Rugby union career
- Position: Prop
- Current team: Leinster
Senior career
| Years | Team | Apps | (Points) |
| 2013– | Leinster | 162 | (50) |
- Correct as of 14 November 2026
International career
| Years | Team | Apps | (Points) |
| 2011–2012 | Ireland U20 | 12 | (0) |
| 2015– | Ireland | 91 | (30) |
| 2017, 2021, 2025 | British & Irish Lions | 9 | (0) |
- Correct as of 21 November 2026

Tadhg Vincent Anthony Furlong (born 14 November 1992) is an Irish professional rugby union player who plays as tighthead prop for United Rugby Championship club Leinster, the Ireland national team and the British & Irish Lions. He has started all three test matches on three British & Irish lions tours.

== Early life ==
Furlong comes from a farming family in the parish of Horeswood in County Wexford. He started his rugby playing underage at New Ross RFC in County Wexford.

Furlong also played Gaelic football and Hurling for Horeswood.

== Club career ==
Furlong made his senior debut for Leinster Rugby in November 2013 as a replacement against the Dragons. He was part of the Leinster A team which won the 2013–14 British and Irish Cup. Ahead of the 2014–15 season, Furlong was promoted from the Leinster Academy to the senior squad.

In 2021 Furlong was selected to World Rugby's Dream Team of the Year.

== International career ==
=== Ireland ===
Furlong made his Ireland senior debut on 29 August 2015 against Wales in a warm-up game for the 2015 Rugby World Cup. He was named in the Ireland squad for the World Cup on 1 September 2015. In November 2016, Furlong started for Ireland in the Autumn Internationals, including the historical victory over New Zealand on 15 November 2016. He also played for Ireland in the 2017 Six Nations Championship.

=== British & Irish Lions ===
Furlong was selected in Warren Gatland's squad for the 2017 British & Irish Lions tour to New Zealand. He started all three test matches in the drawn series.

Furlong was named in the squad for the 2021 British & Irish Lions tour to South Africa and started all three tests in the Lions' 2–1 series loss to the Springboks.

He was included in his third touring squad for the Lions' successful 2025 tour to Australia where he started all three test matches.

== Honours ==
Individual

- 3× World Rugby Men's 15s Dream Team of the Year: 2021, 2022, 2023

Ireland

- 3× Six Nations Championship: 2018, 2023, 2024
- 2× Grand Slam: 2018, 2023
- 5× Triple Crown: 2018, 2022, 2023, 2025, 2026

Leinster

- 5× United Rugby Championship: 2018, 2019, 2020, 2021, 2025
- 1× European Rugby Champions Cup: 2018

British & Irish Lions

- Tour Win:
  - Australia 2025

== Personal life ==
Furlong married his long term partner Aine Lacey in 2023. His father died in December 2023 from cancer.
