= Caelan Doris =

Irish rugby union player (born 1998)

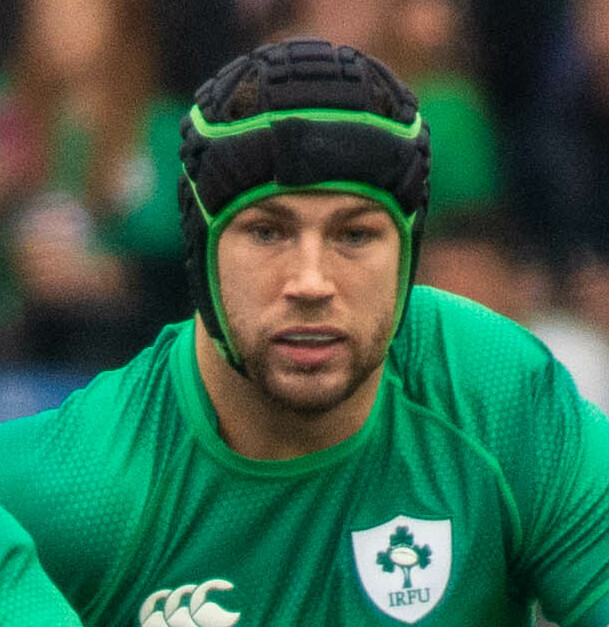
- Doris playing for Ireland against Italy during the 2023 Six Nations.
- Born: 2 April 1998 (age 28) Ballina, Ireland
- Height: 1.93 m (6 ft 4 in)
- Weight: 111 kg (245 lb; 17 st 7 lb)
- School: Blackrock College
- University: University College Dublin

Rugby union career
- Position(s): Number 8, Flanker
- Current team: Leinster
Senior career
Years	Team	Apps	(Points)
2018–	Leinster	100	(100)
- Correct as of 24 January 2026
International career
Years	Team	Apps	(Points)
2017–2018	Ireland U20	14	(15)
2020–	Ireland	61	(50)
- Correct as of 14 March 2026

Caelan Doris (born 2 April 1998) is an Irish professional rugby union player. He plays as a number eight for United Rugby Championship club Leinster and the Ireland national team.

== Early life ==
Doris was born in Lacken, County Mayo. Doris's first involvement with rugby was with Ballina. He attended boarding school from the age of 12 onwards at Blackrock College in Dublin, where he was a member of the victorious Leinster Schools Rugby Senior Cup team in 2014 as well as captaining the 2016 side. His father Chris had attended Blackrock College, final year 1980, playing rugby at centre.

Doris gained a degree in psychology at University College Dublin. He played two years on the Ireland Under-20 rugby team, the second as captain.

== Professional career ==
=== Leinster ===
After leaving school in 2016, Doris spent a year in the Leinster sub-academy before entering the academy in summer 2017. After a series of strong performances captaining the Ireland Under-20s, Doris was promoted two years early to Leinster's senior squad ahead of the 2018–19 season, after just one year in the academy, and having made his senior debut the previous season. On 18 December 2023, the IRFU announced that Doris had been given a three-year 'central contract' paid by the union, extending his time at Leinster until July 2027.

In April 2025, he was nominated for Champions Cup Player of the Year 2025.

=== Ireland ===
==== Youth ====
Doris played for Ireland Under-20s in both 2017 and 2018, captaining them in the 2018 World Rugby Under 20 Championship. Despite a poor campaign from Ireland, he was one of the standout players of the tournament. He has 14 Ireland under-20 caps despite being injured for the entire 2018 Six Nations Under 20 Championship.

==== Senior ====
Doris received his first call up to the senior Ireland squad for the 2020 Six Nations Championship, and made his debut when he started at number 8 in Ireland's opening fixture against Scotland on 1 February 2020, though a concussion meant that his debut lasted only four minutes. Doris missed the 2021 Six Nations and returned to play for Ireland in the summer and autumn internationals playing a starring role in Ireland wins against Japan, New Zealand and Argentina. Doris also scored his first tries for Ireland in the matches against New Zealand and Argentina. Doris was selected by his fellow players as the Irish men's Players’ Player of the Year 2023 at the Rugby Players Ireland awards.

On 11 February 2024, Doris captained the Ireland team for the first time in their game against Italy in the Six Nations Championship. In October 2024, he was named as squad captain ahead of the 2024 Autumn Nations Series. In November 2024, he was nominated for World Rugby Player of the Year award for 2024 and named at No.8 in the 2024 World Rugby Dream Team of the Year. He was named captain of the Irish squad ahead of the 2026 Six Nations.

== Career statistics ==
=== List of international tries ===
Number	Position	Points	Tries	Result	Opposition	Venue	Date
1	Flanker	5	1	Won	New Zealand	Aviva Stadium	13 November 2021
2	Number 8	5	1	Won	Argentina	Aviva Stadium	21 November 2021
3	Number 8	5	1	Won	Wales	Millennium Stadium	4 February 2023
4–5	Flanker	10	2	Won	Italy	Aviva Stadium	5 August 2023
6	Number 8	5	1	Won	Tonga	Stade de la Beaujoire	16 September 2023
7	Number 8	5	1	Won	Fiji	Aviva Stadium	23 November 2024
8	Number 8	5	1	Won	Australia	Aviva Stadium	30 November 2024

as of 20 August 2023

== Honours ==
Individual

- 1× Pro14 Young Player of the Year: 2020
- 1× Autumn Nations Series Player of the Series: 2021
- 1× IRUPA Players' Player of the Year: 2023
- 2× World Rugby Men's 15s Dream Team of the Year: 2023, 2024

Leinster

- 5 x Pro14: 2018, 2019, 2020, 2021, 2025

Ireland

- 2x Six Nations Championship: 2023, 2024
- 1x Grand Slam: 2023
- 4x Triple Crown: 2022, 2023, 2025, 2026
