= Simon Amor =

English rugby union coach & former player

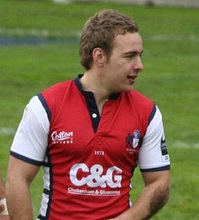
- Amor, after Gloucester v Saracens match in 2005
- Born: Simon Daniel Edward Amor; 25 April 1979 (age 47) Kingston, London, England
- Height: 5 ft 6 in (1.68 m)
- Weight: 76 kg (12 st 0 lb; 168 lb)
- School: Hampton School
- University: Cambridge University

Rugby union career
- Position: Scrum-half
Senior career
Years	Team	Apps	(Points)
- Harlequins
1997–1998	London Irish	1	(11)
1999	Blackheath	11	(83)
1999	Coventry	10	(9)
- Rugby Lions
2002–2006	Gloucester		
2006–2008	London Wasps		
2008–2010	London Scottish		
International career
Years	Team	Apps	(Points)
- England Students
National sevens team
Years	Team		Comps
2001–2006	England		
Coaching career
- Years: Team
- 2010–2011: London Scottish
- 2011–2013: London Scottish (Director of Rugby)
- 2013–2021: England sevens
- 2016, 2021: Great Britain sevens
- 2020: England (defence coach)
- 2021: Hong Kong
- 2021–2022: Japan sevens (technical director)
- 2022–2024: Japan sevens
- 2024-: United States men's national rugby sevens team
Medal record
Men's rugby sevens
Representing England
Commonwealth Games
Silver medal – second place	2006 Melbourne	Team competition
Representing Great Britain (as coach)
Summer Olympic Games
Silver medal – second place	2016 Rio	Team competition

Simon Daniel Edward Amor (born 25 April 1979) is an English rugby union coach and former player. Amor played in the scrum-half and fly-half positions for London Scottish and captained the England national rugby sevens team. He has been the head coach of London Scottish, England sevens, Hong Kong, and, as recently as 2020, was appointed defence-coach for the England rugby union team.

== Early life ==
Amor was educated at Denmead Preparatory School, Hampton School, St. Mary's University College (Twickenham) and Cambridge University. At Cambridge he earned a blue playing in the 2000 Varsity Rugby Match for Cambridge University RUFC against Oxford University RFC at Twickenham Stadium and went on to graduate with a degree in Management Studies. He also completed an MBA whilst playing professional rugby.

== Playing career ==
Amor started his rugby career at London Irish where he played as a junior before joining the senior squad. During the summer of 2002, Amor signed a professional contract with Gloucester. He has previously played for Harlequins, London Irish, Blackheath, Coventry and the Rugby Lions. Whilst at Gloucester he was a replacement in the 2003 Powergen Cup Final in which Gloucester defeated Northampton Saints.

In August 2002, Amor represented the England Sevens at the 2002 Commonwealth Games.He played again at the 2006 Commonwealth Games winning a silver medal. In 2003 he was part of the England squad to face the Barbarian F.C. at Twickenham. In December 2004, Amor was the inaugural IRB Sevens Player of the Year. Amor captained England to win the Hong Kong 7s four times.

In August 2005, Amor was instrumental in Gloucester's victory at the Middlesex Sevens.

In May 2006, Amor joined London Wasps, as replacement for their retiring scrum-half, Matt Dawson. In August 2006, Amor was the key playmaker in London Wasps's victory at the Middlesex Sevens.

== Coaching career ==
In 2008, Amor signed as a player/coach for London Scottish. He became a Performance Advisor at UK Sport and was appointed on to the advisory board of Ultimate Rugby Sevens. In May 2010, Amor took over the role of Head Coach for London Scottish, and in November 2011, took over the role of Director of Rugby at the club. In 2012 he led them to promotion to the RFU Championship.

=== England ===
Amor was Head Coach of the England women sevens team at the 2009 Rugby World Cup Sevens. In September 2013 he took over the role of Head Coach of the England national rugby sevens team and was the longest serving England 7s coach. He was responsible for bringing together the men's and women's programs and oversaw them both. In 2016, Amor was appointed Head Coach of the Great Britain Sevens team who won a silver medal at the Olympic Games in Rio, Brazil.

2017 saw England finish 2nd in the World Rugby Sevens Series, equaling their highest ever finish. The previous time this was achieved was in 2006 when Amor was captain of the squad. England were runners up at the 2018 Rugby World Cup Sevens. Amor coached the men's seven teams to qualification for the 2020 Summer Olympics, but moved on to coach the 15s game before the event.

In January 2020, he was appointed attack coach of the England Rugby team, under Eddie Jones where the team won the 2020 Six Nations Championship and the Autumn Nations Cup. He left the role in May 2021, following England's poor showing in the 2021 Six Nations.

=== Other sevens coaching ===
Amor is currently the head coach of the men's United States national rugby sevens team.

After being appointed the coach of Hong Kong in mid-2021 for a brief spell, Amor went back to coaching sevens rugby, being the technical director of Japan starting in November 2021. Amor remained in the role throughout the teams World Rugby Sevens season. In September 2022, before the beginning of the following season (2022–23), Amor was appointed head coach of the sevens team by the JRFU. It is Amor's third national sevens team he has coached, and the first outside Great Britain. On 30 September 2024 USA Rugby announced Amor's appointment as its national rugby sevens coach. In May 2025 he was appointed to a new post with Hong Kong Rugby Union - again.

== See also ==
- Cambridge University RUFC
- Hampton School
