= Ruby Tui =

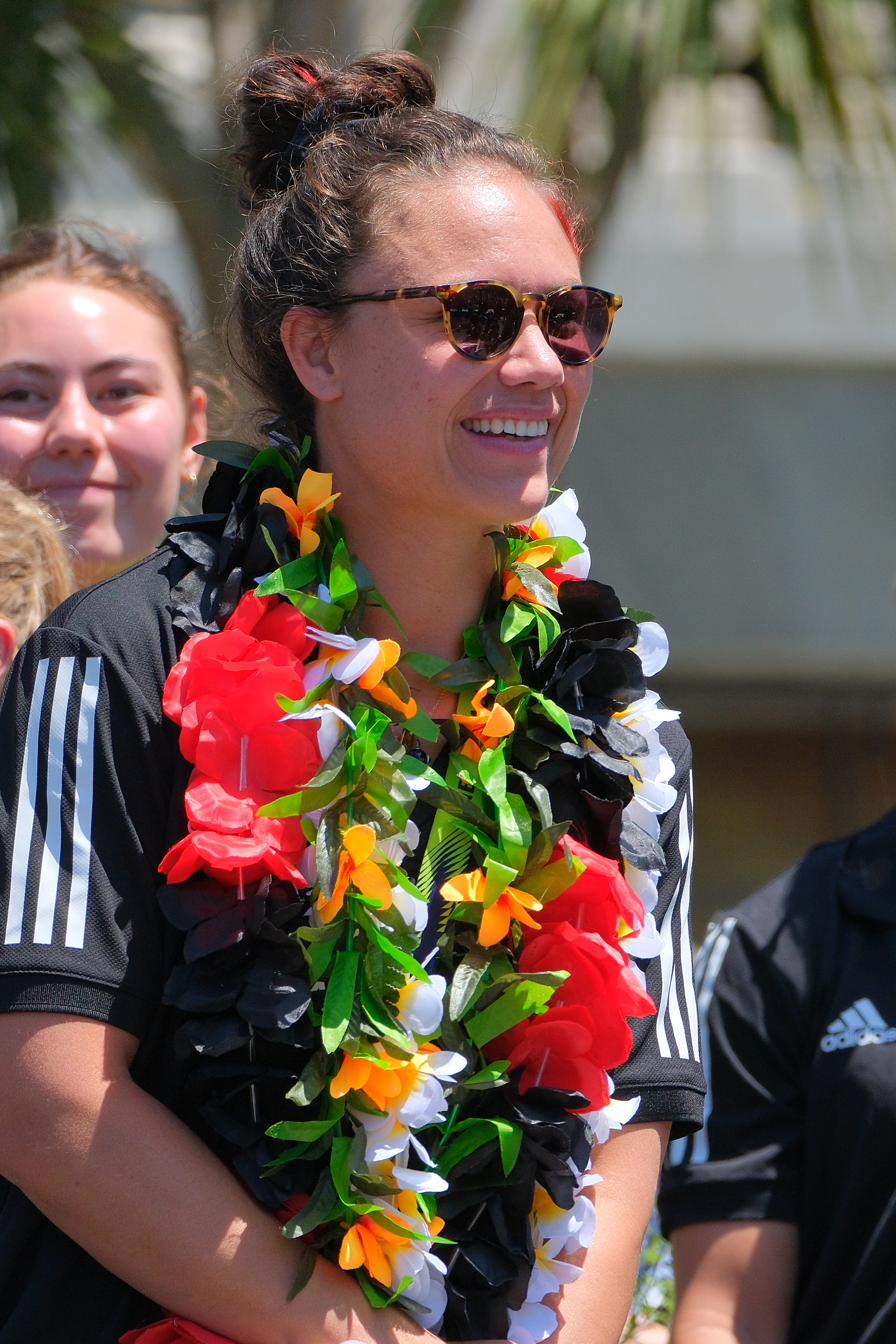
- Tui in 2022
- Born: 13 December 1991 (age 34) Wellington, New Zealand
- Height: 1.77 m (5 ft 10 in)
- Weight: 71 kg (157 lb)

Rugby union career
- Position(s): Prop (7s), Outside back (15s)
- Current team: Trailfinders Women
Senior career
Years	Team	Apps	(Points)
2022-2025	Chiefs Manawa	16	(60)
2026-Present	Trailfinders Women		
Provincial / State sides
Years	Team	Apps	(Points)
2011	Canterbury	5	(5)
2020–2023	Counties Manukau	12	(80)
International career
Years	Team	Apps	(Points)
2022–	New Zealand	20	(40)
2026	Barbarians	1	
National sevens team
Years	Team		Comps
2012–	New Zealand		158 appearances
- Correct as of 2 February 2023
Medal record
Women's rugby sevens
Representing New Zealand
Olympic Games
Gold medal – first place	2020 Tokyo	Team competition
Silver medal – second place	2016 Rio de Janeiro	Team competition
Rugby World Cup Sevens
Gold medal – first place	2018 San Francisco	Team competition
Rugby World Cup (women)
Gold medal – first place	2021 New Zealand	Team competition

Ruby Malae Tui (born 13 December 1991) is a New Zealand rugby union player. She competed internationally when the national rugby sevens team won the silver medal at the 2016 Summer Olympics tournament. She won a gold medal in rugby sevens at the 2020 Summer Olympics. She was a member of the Black Ferns team that won the 2021 Rugby World Cup.

== Early life ==
Tui was born via home birth in Island Bay, Wellington, on 13 December 1991 to Marion Mouat and Kovati "Vaki" Tui. At the time of her birth, her mother was a graphic designer, while her father was a musician. Her father is Samoan, while her mother is from the West Coast and of Irish and Scottish heritage. By the age of four, her parents were no longer living together full-time, mostly due to her father's alcoholism. Tui lived with her mother in the house she owned in Newtown, Wellington.

For her education, Tui first attended Wellington South Kindergarten and then Kilbirnie Primary School. Her first exposure to sports was playing football for the Island Bay Hammerheads.

When Tui was about seven or eight, her mother, Marion, entered into a new relationship, which led to her parents permanently separating. Marion's new partner moved in, and Tui remembers that from early in the relationship, he was abusive to her mother. Soon, her mother was pregnant with her younger brother, Dane. She was convinced by her partner to sell her house and move with him to Tākaka, in the South Island, which cost her mother her well-paying job and isolated her from her friends. Her mother bought a clothing business in the town, while her partner lived on a sickness benefit and took recreational drugs. At her new school, Tui continued to play football. Following the birth of her brother, the house was raided by the police, and her mother's partner decided it was prudent to leave town.

They moved to the isolated house five kilometres outside of the settlement of Canvastown in Marlborough. During the three years that they lived there, Tui remembers her mother working long hours in part-time jobs to support the family while being subjected to continuous domestic violence. On one occasion, Tui herself was punched in the face. The school she was enrolled in only had 26 pupils, and as there were no football or netball teams, in her second year in the area, she played rugby on the boys team.

Between the ages of nine and eleven, she would spend her school holidays either with her mother's relatives on the West Coast or with her father in Wellington. It was during one such stay with her father when she was eleven that Tui learned she had a 16-year-old half-sister, Lesh. At this point, her father's life revolved around alcohol, recreational drugs, and partying. Tui was to witness the impacts of drugs on people, drug dealing, and, on one occasion, witness the death of a woman from a drug overdose firsthand. In such an environment, Tui had begun drinking alcohol by the age of 11.

Tui decided she was unable to return to the abusive environment on Canvastown and told her mother she was going to live permanently in Wellington with her father. Her mother briefly left her abuser and joined her daughter in Wellington, where she assisted in enrolling Tui in Year 8 at Evans Bay Intermediate before being drawn back to Canvastown. Tui stayed, living with her Samoan grandfather. A year later, Marion (who was still with her abusive partner) convinced Tui, who was concerned about the safety of her little brother, to return with her in exchange for a promise to let her daughter attend school in Greymouth. Initially, she stayed with her uncle and aunt while the 13-year-old Tui commenced Year 9 at her sixth school, John Paul II High School in Greymouth.

Her mother eventually bought a house in Blackball, 30 km from Greymouth, which allowed Tui to remain educated in Greymouth. The abusive partner moved as well, until, following a particular bad episode, the police arrived to take him away. This allowed Marion the opportunity to escape, with her two children, to the safety of a Women's Refuge safe house in Westport. With the assistance of Women's Refuge, she was able to get a restraining order issued against her partner and finally break free, allowing Tui to enjoy a stable home environment. A couple of years later, Marion and her children moved to Greymouth. In high school, Tui played football, hockey, netball, rugby, and squash, as well as competing in athletic events and speech competitions. Her great passion was netball, and she dreamed of being a Silver Fern. She played for her school, Catholic Schools Combined, attended the Canterbury Netball Academy, and was good enough to be selected to play in an overseas age group netball tournament in Australia.

In 2010, with thoughts of being a journalist, Tui moved at the age of 18 to Christchurch, where she commenced studying for a Bachelor of Arts degree at the University of Canterbury, which she completed in 2012. To fund her studies, she had a variety of part-time jobs scheduled around her studies, such as barkeeping, gardening, and labouring. Summer jobs over the recess included postman, lifeguard, and bartender, many of which involved her working 80-hour weeks. Once in Christchurch, she kept up her involvement in netball but found it tough going due to the expense, transport difficulties, and lack of her old Greymouth friends to provide emotional support.

== Rugby career ==
In March 2010, Tui was living in the university halls of residence when she was invited by a friend she had made to come down and join in a casual game of rugby being played on the adjacent sports field. Among those on the field that day were Black Ferns Olivia Coady, Kendra Cocksedge, Kimberley Smith, and Anika Tiplady. Tui was smitten by both the game and the welcoming nature of the other players. She proceeded to purchase a second-hand pair of rugby boots for NZ$20, and in March 2010, Tui joined the University Rugby Football Club. She began playing on the wing for their women's fifteen-a-side team, coached by Ernie Goodhue, which competed in the local club competition. Initially, she continued to play netball as well until, on 26 May 2010, she announced to her family and friends that she would commit herself exclusively to rugby.

Following the completion of the club rugby season, the absence of Canterbury's Black Ferns overseas gave Tui the opportunity she needed, and she was selected to play at centre for the province. Watching on television the Black Ferns in early September 2010 winning the Women's Rugby World Cup, Tui credits with inspiring her that she could one day be a Black Fern.

=== Sevens ===
With that year's fifteen-a-side season having come to an end, Tui was enticed towards the end of 2010 by Goodhue into playing club sevens rugby over the summer of 2010/2011 for the university team that he was coaching. They went on to win the local club championship. While playing fifteen-a-side rugby, Tui found that, while fast, she was not fit enough to avoid many tackles, and her 62 kg body was not strong enough to withstand the punishment from multiple opposition players weighing 100 kg or more tackling her. She found, once she had improved her fitness, that the fewer opposition players in sevens gave her the space needed to reduce the chances of being tackled.

As well as sevens, Tui continued playing fifteen-a-side club rugby in 2011, as well as being selected to play on the wing for Canterbury in that year's National Provincial Competition. Tui, however, found it hard to make the starting team due to the province's Black Ferns having returned from the previous year's World Cup. She returned to play sevens for the University Rugby Football Club over the summer of 2011/2012. In addition, with the support of Goodhue, she was able to secure an invitation in 2011 to play for the unofficial Canterbury-based KUSA (Kiwi/USA) Superclub Sevens team that was coached by Mere Baker. She was on the KUSA development side, which completed a Gold Coast tournament in November 2011, losing in the quarterfinals to Tonga.

In 2012, the New Zealand Rugby Union organised a "Go for Gold" campaign to identify talent with the potential to represent New Zealand in the sevens competition at the Rio Olympics. After receiving a pamphlet on the programme in March 2012, which stated that potentially 14 contracts would be available, Tui decided to register for what was termed the "Sevens Academy" and attended the Canterbury open trial being held at Burnham in early 2012. At the trial, she was put through various fitness, rugby skill, and character assessment activities. Of the 800 who attended a trial, Tui was (along with Michaela Blyde, Gayle Broughton, Sarah Hirini, Tyla Nathan-Wong and Portia Woodman) among the 60 deemed promising who attended a training camp at Waiouru in mid-2012. Tui impressed the selectors to be among the 30 who then attended a second training camp at Waiouru. In between, she had played tag rugby and, despite having no Māori connection, competed in that year's Te Waipounmu Maori Rugby Tournament.

==== Debuts for the Black Fern Sevens ====
Tui made her New Zealand Sevens debut against Tonga in the No. 4 jersey in the 2012 Oceania Women's Sevens Championship held in August 2012 in Fiji. She went on to play against the Cook Islands, Fiji, and Australia in the final. For her efforts, she and the rest of the team each received a NZ$2,000 tournament fee. In January 2013, at the age of 21, she was appointed captain of the Canterbury team that competed in that year's New Zealand National Rugby Sevens Women's Tournament. It was the first time that the tournament had been held in 10 years. Canterbury made the final four, and her performance led to Tui being invited to several Black Ferns Sevens training camps and then being selected for the team for the Guangzhou tournament held in March 2013. It was not until the final that Tui got to play when she came on for an injured Honey Hireme and scored a try. She was then selected for the team for the Amsterdam tournament, which was the last of the season.

She was among the squad of 12 (which included Kendra Cocksedge, Sarah Goss, Huriana Manuel, Linda Itunu, Tyla Nathan-Wong and Portia Woodman) that won the 2012 Oceania Women's Sevens Championship, which gained them entry to the 2013 World Cup in Moscow, Russia, which they won.

==== Progresses to become a regular player ====
Despite attending several sevens training camps, Tui was not selected for the first two tournaments (Dubai in 2012 and Houston in February 2013) of the inaugural four-tournament Women's Sevens Series. She had already decided that in order to make the team, she had to add muscles to what she perceived as her skinny frame. This led to her working during the university's summer recess, manhandling timber at a sawmill on the West Coast. By the time of Tui's return to her studies in the following year, she had achieved the more muscular figure she desired. This change must have been of benefit, for she was selected for the third tournament of the series, the China tournament, in March 2013. Once there, she remained out of the starting lineup, and it was not until she was substituted on for an injured Honey Hireme in the final against England that she debuted and went on to score a try, contributing to her team's 19–5 win.

In May 2013, when playing against China in pool play in the Amsterdam tournament, she ruptured her anterior cruciate ligament (ACL) and was flown home to New Zealand. As a result of her injury, she was not selected to compete in the 2013 Sevens World Cup team. Tui thought at the time that she may never play again, and even if she could, she may never again be selected for the team. It was another three months before she was able to receive knee reconstruction surgery.

While she recovered, she studied for a Certificate of Sports and Fitness at Aoraki Polytechnic. To ensure that she was not forgotten by the coaching team, at the end of 2013, she moved from Christchurch to Tauranga, which was where the sevens training hub was located. Despite not being fully recovered from her injury, in January 2014, she was given a "tier two" contract worth NZ$25,000 for the 2014/2015 season. It took 16 months for her return to the team, with her first game being in the Oceania tournament in Noosa in September 2014. Since then, Tui has been a part of the national setup and has been described as a "powerful and aggressive prop". In 2015, Tui injured her posterior cruciate ligament (PCL), which forced her to miss the fourth tournament of the season.

==== 2016 Rio Olympic Games ====
Tui was one of the 12 players selected for the New Zealand team to compete in the sevens competition at the Rio Olympics. Tui scored a try in the semi-final against Great Britain and played in the final, which New Zealand lost to Australia. Because of the impact that she have seen alcohol had on her father and other sportspeople, Tui had refused to drink and had made a promise with Tyla Nathan-Wong that she would maintain that stance until her team made the Olympics. As a result, she had her first drink with her teammates at the celebrations at their hotel after the bittersweet final. Nathan-Wong had gone further and had promised that she would not touch alcohol until they won gold. Following the final, Tui was among the seven members of the team who stayed in Tokyo to watch the rest of the games.

==== Recommits to playing for the New Zealand Sevens ====
In the immediate aftermath of the failure to win gold and disillusioned with the culture, the way they were being coached, and the impact the travelling was having on her personal relationship, Tui felt that she could not commit to another four years until the next Olympics and needed to leave the team. However, the day after the final, she was approached by assistant coach Allan Bunting, with whom she unburdened all of her frustrations. Bunting told her that the head coach was leaving and that he was thinking of applying for the position. Tui urged him to apply and told him that if he was appointed, she would stay. Following his appointment as head coach, Allan Bunting organised Kelly Brazier, Kayla McAlister, Sarah Hirini, Niall Williams, Tyla Nathan-Wong, Ruby Tui, and Portia Woodman into a leadership group.

In 2017, Tui and a number of other sevens players were approached by the coaching team of the fifteen-a-side Black Ferns to see if she was interested in being a member of the Black Ferns team to compete in the upcoming World Championships. Become a Black Fern had always been one of her sporting goals, but she was of the opinion that she needed preparation at the club and provincial level before playing at the national level. After discussing it with Allan Bunting, who wanted her to stay and become more involved in the team's leadership, she decided, unlike some of the other sevens players, not to reply to the enquiry. Despite the loss of some of their best-known players, Tui and the rest of the sevens team won in Canada in May and then in France in June to ensure that the team won the World Series. As a result of her performance throughout the series, Tui was named Black Ferns Sevens Player of the Year and was also nominated for World Rugby Sevens Player of the Year, losing out to teammate Michaela Blyde.

==== 2018 Gold Coast Commonwealth Games ====
Tui was selected for the New Zealand team to compete in the sevens competition at the Gold Coast Commonwealth Games.

Three weeks prior to entering Games Village, the sevens team entered a pre-games training camp on the Sunshine Coast. The female players were sleeping together on mattresses in the lounge of one of the apartments that they were renting. Approximately 10 days into the camp, Tui noticed something was wrong with her body and was diagnosed with mumps by the Commonwealth team doctor. This was despite her being vaccinated against it as a child at 15 months and four years. Its highly contagious nature meant that Tui was moved into her own room, and the rest of the team had to go into isolation until it was confirmed that they did not have the infection. Despite beginning to suffer from severe headaches and deteriorating health, she tried to convince doctors and the coaches that she was feeling fine. Her condition worsened overnight with severe pain, vomiting, and loss of vision that prevented her from finding her cellphone and left her too weak to reach the door to get help. When someone attempted to check on her the next morning and found the door locked, a key was obtained from reception, and her true condition became clear. Tui was rushed to the hospital and given an emergency lumbar puncture to release excess body fluid in her spine and brain caused by a viral infection. With six days still to go until the competition commenced, Tui was convinced that she could play, and despite having lost 10 kg in weight and feeling nauseous when she heard coach Allan Bunting was coming to see her, she pulled out her IV drips and arranged to meet him in the hospital's café. He had been under the impression that she was bedridden and was intending to inform her that she was being dropped from the team. Instead, he found Tui full of bravo and left confused, without passing on the message. After vomiting in the toilets, she returned to her room, where the upset nurses immediately hooked her back up to the IV tubes. As soon as they had left, Tui decided to get out of the hospital with the assistance of her partner, which ended with Tui falling to her hands and knees and vomiting in the parking lot. This finally brought Tui to her senses, and rather than stay and watch the games, Tui flew home once she was cleared to do so and watched the Commonwealth competition from there. She and those who had not made the travelling team welcomed the rest of the team, who were home with gold medals, with a haka at the airport.

While determined to rejoin the team, Tui was unable to compete in the World Rugby Sevens Series tournament held in Kitakyushu, Japan, but was sufficiently recovered to be cleared to play for the Black Ferns in the Canada tournament held in Langford in May 2018, which the team won, and then repeated with winning the France tournament. That July, Tui was a member of the team that won the 2018 Sevens Rugby World Cup in San Francisco.

==== 2020 Tokyo Olympic Games ====
In 2021, she was a member of the New Zealand team that won the gold medal in the women's event at the 2020 Summer Olympics.

==== 2022 Commonwealth Games ====
Tui was named as a non-travelling reserve for the Black Ferns Sevens squad for the 2022 Commonwealth Games in Birmingham.

In January 2019, she played in the invitational Fast Four tournament in Hamilton. These were her first international sevens appearance in front of a home audience.

Tui competed in the Oceania tournament in Townsville, Australia. In the game against Fiji, she received a knee to the forehead but continued to play on until the referee sent her off for medical attention. Following treatment, which required seven stitches, she returned to score a try in the game against Australia.

==== 2023 Premier Rugby Sevens ====
After renewing her contract with the New Zealand Rugby Union, Tui took an immediate sabbatical, where she signed a contract with the Golden State Retrievers of Premier Rugby Sevens.

Tui captained the squad during the Retriever's inaugural season, totalling 11 carries, 5 tackles, and 3 steals. The squad went 2–2 throughout the season, just missing a ticket to the Championship Tournament in Washington, D.C.

The Retrievers went 1–1 at the Western Conference Kickoff at TCO Stadium, earning the franchise's first-ever team victory. The squad also went 1–1 at the Western Conference Finals at PayPal Park.

When Tui was not on the field playing for the Retrievers, she was travelling around the States with PR7s, calling games in the broadcast booth during the Eastern Conference tournaments.

=== Return to fifteen-a-side ===
As a result of the COVID-19 pandemic, the international sevens series competition was cancelled. This led to Tui playing for the Ponsonby Fillies in the 2020 Auckland women's fifteen-a-side club rugby competition, which they won. She followed this up by playing on the wing for Counties Manukau in that year's Farah Palmer Cup competition and was their leading try scorer. In November 2021, Tui was named in the Chiefs squad for the inaugural 2022 season of Super Rugby Aupiki. In the final, Tui scored one of the decisive tries, which allowed her side to take the title.

Tui was selected for the Black Ferns squad that participated in the 2022 Pacific Four Series, during which she made her international debut on the wing against Australia at Tauranga on 6 June. She scored two tries against Canada in the Pacific Four Series.

She was selected for the August test series against Australia for the Laurie O'Reilly Cup.

==== 2021 Rugby World Cup ====
With only three test matches to her name, she was named in the Black Ferns 2021 Rugby World Cup 32-player squad. She made her debut with a try in the game against Wales; it was one of the three matches of the tournament in which she participated, the other two being against France in the semi-final (in which she scored a try) and England in the final, which was won by the Black Ferns. Following the game, she led the crowd in singing a Māori folk song, Tūtira Mai Ngā Iwi.

After receiving her gold medal, she spotted a young girl in the crowd and gave her the medal. The 11-year-old recipient had recently recovered from leukaemia and had been introduced to Tui at a fan engagement event earlier in the week. Tui was presented with a replacement gold medal at the World Rugby Awards in Monaco in November 2022.

==== Renews her contract with the New Zealand Rugby Union ====
Following the success of the World Cup, Tui did not return to playing for the Sevens team for the remainder of the 2022/2023 season. On 30 April 2023, Tui announced that she turned down enquiries from various overseas organisations to sign a two-year contract with the New Zealand Rugby Union. The contract allowed for her to take a sabbatical.

In 2023, Tui used her sabbatical to play in the United States for the Golden State Retrievers in the Premier Rugby Sevens (PR7s). One of the team's assistant coaches was Mere Baker, who had been one of Tui's earliest sevens coaches.

Tui was named in 2023 as a member of the Black Ferns team to contest the inaugural WV1 competition. Tui played against France, Wales (in which she scored four tries within the space of 13 minutes), and England.

In late 2023, Tui signed to play for Chiefs Manawa in the 2024 Super Rugby Aupiki competition.

==== Barbarians ====
Based on her performance providing commentary and analysis for the 2025 Rugby World Cup, she was invited to join Barbarian F.C. in May 2026. Having made herself available for World Cup selection, but missing out on making the team, her acceptance to the invitation saw her appear for the Barbarians against Wales at Allianz Stadium.

==== Move to the PWR ====
In August 2026 it was announced Tui had joined Premiership Women's Rugby club; Trailfinders Women on a one year contract.

== Television career ==
Tui started writing articles about women's rugby club in local Christchurch newspapers while studying for a media degree at the University of Canterbury. With the help of Melodie Robinson and Scotty Stevenson, she was able to obtain occasional assignments, commentating alongside Ken Laban on a Black Fern game. In February 2019, she became the first woman to commentate on a male World Sevens Tournament. In 2023, she commentated for Sky Sport on several games in the 2023 Super Rugby Aupiki competition, and in 2025 she was a pundit for the BBC at the Women's Rugby World Cup.

== Awards and honours ==
- 2017, Canada Sevens Langford dream team.
- 2019, HSBC Dream Team for the 2019 series.
- 2019, World Rugby Women's Sevens Player of the Year.
- 2022 World Rugby Women's 15s Breakthrough Player of the Year.
- 2022 World Rugby Women's 15s Dream Team of the Year.

== Personal life ==
Tui has three half-siblings, Lesh, Dane, and Nikki. In 2012, Tui completed a Bachelor of Arts degree, with a major in Media and Communication and another in English. Tui received a scholarship to study at Aoraki Polytechnic, where she completed a Certificate in Sports and Fitness in 2013.

For seven years until 2019, Tui was in a relationship with another woman.

On 27 September 2022, she released her autobiography, Straight Up. The book was written in conjunction with professional writer Margie Thomson and came about after Tui was approached by Jenny Hellen at publisher Allen & Unwin New Zealand. In the book, she describes her problematic family background, her sexuality, and the circumstances that repeatedly led her to consider abandoning her sporting career prematurely. At the 2023 Aotearoa Book Trade Industry Awards, the book won the Nielsen Bookdata New Zealand Bestseller Award for the best-selling New Zealand title published between April 2022 and March 2023.
