= Ollie Phillips (rugby union) =

English rugby union player

Ollie Phillips (born 8 September 1982 in Brighton) is an English former professional rugby union player. Phillips captained England Sevens and was named '7s World Rugby Player of the Year' in 2009, while also pursuing a professional career in 15s with four clubs in England and France, where he was voted 'Overseas Player of the Year' in 2011.

== Early life ==
Phillips was born in Brighton, and studied at Durham University, where he was a member of Van Mildert College, graduating in 2004. He later studied for an MBA at Cambridge, where he won a blue in the Varsity Match.

== Rugby ==
Phillips captained England Sevens to three World Series Cup victories - including in New Zealand - and six finals. In 2009, he was voted World Rugby Seven's player of the year.

He also played in 15-a-side rugby union at wing and full-back for Harlequins, Newcastle Falcons, Stade Français and Gloucester Rugby. In all, he played in three Heineken Cups, a European Cup Final, and was voted Best Overseas Player in France in 2011.

In 2022 it was announced that Phillips had taken up the role as head coach of the China rugby sevens team.

== Charity Adventures ==
Clipper Round the World Race - Phillips took part in September 2013. After 11 months and 40,000 miles, the team finished second overall.

Arctic Guinness World Record - Phillips headed to the North Pole for the 'Arctic Rugby Challenge', joining a 100-mile trek to the Magnetic North Pole where he hosted the 'Most Northerly Rugby Match', breaking the Guinness World Record.

== Rugby Awards ==
- IRB International Sevens Player of the Year 2009
- Voted French Overseas Player of the Year, 2011
