= Thomas du Toit =

South Africa international rugby union player

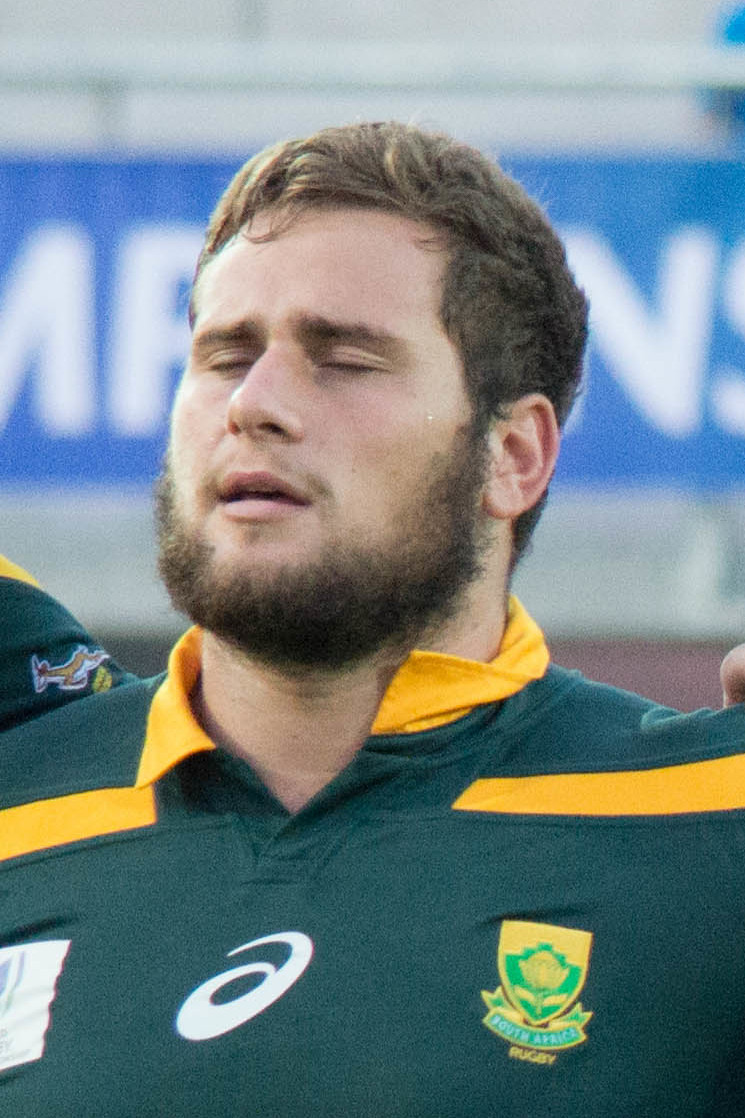
- Du Toit playing in 2015
- Full name: Thomas Joubert du Toit
- Born: 5 May 1995 (age 31) Cape Town, South Africa
- Height: 1.89 m (6 ft 2 1/2 in)
- Weight: 136 kg (21 st 6 lb; 300 lb)
- School: Paarl Boys' High School

Rugby union career
- Position: Prop
- Current team: Sharks
Youth career
- 2008: Boland Cavaliers
- 2011–2013: Western Province
Senior career
Years	Team	Apps	(Points)
2014–2016	Sharks XV	10	(10)
2014–2023	Sharks (Currie Cup)	48	(25)
2014–2023	Sharks	116	(60)
2016–2017	→ Munster	6	(0)
2019–2020	→ Stade Toulousain	1	(0)
2023–2026	Bath Rugby	69	(125)
2026–	Sharks		
- Correct as of 25 July 2026
International career
Years	Team	Apps	(Points)
2013	South Africa Schools	2	(0)
2014–2015	South Africa Under-20	9	(10)
2014–2015	Barbarians	4	(5)
2016–2017	South Africa 'A'	4	(0)
2018–	South Africa	32	(5)
- Correct as of 30 November 2025

Thomas Joubert du Toit (born 5 May 1995) is a South African professional rugby union player for the South Africa national team and Prem Rugby club Bath. His regular position is prop. His nickname is The Tank.

== Club career ==
With no prior first class rugby behind his name, Du Toit was a surprise inclusion in the Sharks squad for the 2014 Super Rugby season. Still finding himself behind the likes of Tendai Mtawarira in the pecking order, however, he dropped down to the Sharks XV squad for the 2014 Vodacom Cup season. He made his senior debut on 7 March 2014, against the Border Bulldogs in East London. He came on as a half-time substitute and scored his first senior try just 15 minutes after coming on. His first start came three weeks later against the Free State XV in Bloemfontein.

On 4 October 2016, it was announced that Du Toit would be joining Irish Pro14 side Munster on a three-month contract, following the completion of his Currie Cup commitments. On 26 November 2016, Du Toit made his competitive debut for Munster when he came on as a replacement in the sides 46–3 win against Benetton in a 2016–17 Pro12 fixture at Thomond Park.

On the 22nd of March 2023 Du Toit signed for English Premiership Rugby side Bath Rugby. Du Toit will officially join the team once the 2023 Rugby World Cup ends and he comes back from playing for South Africa. In October 2023, he made his league debut in a 34–16 victory over Newcastle Red Bulls. In the following game, he scored his first try for the club in a 25–16 victory against Saracens. In December 2023, he scored his first try for the club in the Champions Cup during a 37–14 victory against Ulster. Following an impressive season he was named in the Premiership Rugby Team of the Season for the 2023–24 campaign. In June 2024, he scored a try in the Premiership final before his side went on to lose 25–21 to Northampton Saints.

In January 2025, he scored two tries in the Champions Cup during a 40–21 victory against Clermont Auvergne. In June 2025, he was named in the Premiership team of the Season for a second consecutive year. That same month, he scored a try in his second consecutive Premiership final, this time a 23–21 victory over Leicester Tigers. In the same season, he also featured as the club went on to win a treble including European Challenge Cup and Premiership Rugby Cup.

On 16 October 2025, du Toit would return home to his hometown club Sharks back in South Africa on a long-term deal in the URC competition from the 2026-27 season.

== International career ==
=== Youth ===
Du Toit represented Boland at the Under-13 Craven Week competition in 2008 and Western Province at the 2011 Under-16 Grant Khomo Week and 2013 Under-18 Craven Week competitions. He played for the Paarl Boys' High School first team in 2012 and 2013, also captaining the side in 2013.

In 2013, Du Toit was included in the South African Schools side that played in three matches in August of that year. He made a substitute appearance in a 19–14 victory match over England in Crawford, played the entire second match – a 17–13 victory against France in George and was an unused substitute in their final match, a 14–13 win over Wales in Worcester.

Du Toit then opted to move to Durban to join the Sharks academy for 2014.

Du Toit was included in the South Africa Under-20 side for the 2014 IRB Junior World Championship.

In 2015, Du Toit was included in the South Africa Under-20 squad that toured Argentina. He started both of their tour matches and was then included in the final squad for the 2015 World Rugby Under 20 Championship. He started all three of their matches in Pool B of the competition; a 33–5 win against hosts Italy, a 40–8 win against Samoa which saw Du Toit score South Africa's first try of the match in the seventh minute and a 46–13 win over Australia to help South Africa finish top of Pool B to qualify for the semi-finals with the best record pool stage of all the teams in the competition. Du Toit started their semi-final match against England, but could not prevent them losing 20–28 to be eliminated from the competition by England for the second year in succession. He started their third-place play-off match against France, scoring his second try of the tournament to help South Africa to a 31–18 win to secure third place in the competition.

=== South Africa 'A' ===
In 2016, Du Toit was included in a South Africa 'A' squad that played a two-match series against a touring England Saxons team. He was named in the starting line-up for their first match in Bloemfontein, but ended on the losing side as the visitors ran out 32–24 winners. He also started the second match of the series, a 26–29 defeat to the Saxons in George. He captained the South Africa A-side on 10 November 2022 against Munster Rugby and then again against the Bristol Bears on 17 November 2022.

=== South Africa ===
Du Toit was not initially named in South Africa's squad for the 2019 Rugby World Cup. However he was called up to replace the injured Trevor Nyakane in the pool stage. South Africa went on to win the tournament, defeating England in the final.

In November 2022, he received a red card a dangerous tackle during a 27–13 victory against England in the 2022 Autumn Nations Series. While initially banned six weeks this was later reduced to three.

In November 2025, he was named in the World Rugby Dream Team of the Year.

== Honours ==
South Africa

- 2019 Rugby World Cup winner
- 2025 Rugby Championship winner

== Statistics ==
=== Test match record ===
As of 15 November 2026

Opponent	P	W	D	L	Try	Pts	%Won
Argentina	8	7	0	1	0	0	87.5
Australia	3	3	0	0	0	0	100
Canada	1	1	0	0	0	0	100
England	6	4	0	2	1	5	66.67
France	3	2	0	1	0	0	66.67
Georgia	1	1	0	0	0	0	100
Ireland	1	1	0	0	0	0	100
Italy	2	2	0	0	0	0	100
Namibia	1	1	0	0	0	0	100
New Zealand	6	4	0	2	0	0	66.67
Portugal	1	1	0	0	0	0	100
Scotland	2	2	0	0	1	5	100
Wales	4	1	0	3	0	0	25
Total	39	30	0	9	2	10	76.92

=== International tries ===
As of 4 July 2025

Try	Opposing team	Location	Venue	Competition	Date	Result	Score
1	Scotland	Edinburgh, Scotland	Murrayfield Stadium	2024 end-of-year test	10 November 2024	Win	15–32
2	England	Johannesburg, South Africa	Ellis Park Stadium	2026 Nations Championship	4 July 2026	Win	45–21
