= Braxton Sorensen-McGee =

NZ international rugby union player

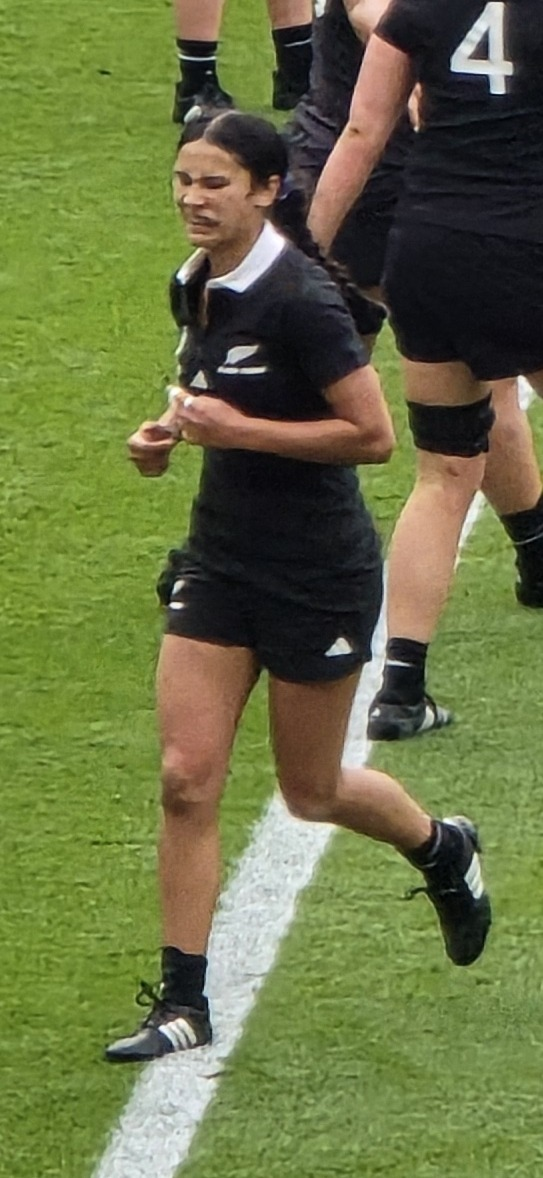
- 2025 Women's Rugby World Cup - New Zealand vs France
- Born: 26 October 2006 (age 20)
- Height: 169 cm (5 ft 7 in)
- Weight: 72 kg (159 lb; 11 st 5 lb)
- Notable relative(s): Scott Sorensen (second cousin); Kurt Sorensen; Dane Sorensen; Bill Sorensen

Rugby union career
- Position: Fullback
Provincial / State sides
| Years | Team | Apps | (Points) |
| 2023– | Auckland Storm | 13 | (52) |
Super Rugby
| Years | Team | Apps | (Points) |
| 2025– | Blues | 16 | (79) |
International career
| Years | Team | Apps | (Points) |
| 2025– | New Zealand | 17 | (185) |
National sevens team
| Years | Team | | Comps |
| 2025– | New Zealand 7s | | |
Medal record
Women's rugby union
Representing New Zealand
World Cup
| Bronze medal – third place | 2025 England | Team competition |

Braxton Sorensen-McGee (born 26 October 2006) is a New Zealand rugby union player. She plays as a fullback or wing for New Zealand (the Black Ferns) at international level and for the Blues in the Super Rugby Aupiki competition. She also represents Auckland Storm in the Farah Palmer Cup.

== Early life and career ==
Sorensen-McGee grew up in a rugby league household, with five relatives from her maternal side having played for the Kiwis. She attended Auckland Girls Grammar School where she played both rugby codes. She also played in several club and age-grade representative sides.

== Rugby career ==
In 2023, as a 16 year old, she was named ‘Rookie of the Year’ in her debut season for the Auckland Storm.

In December 2024, she co-captained the New Zealand women's under-18 sevens side at the Global Youth Cup which was played in Auckland. They finished third after losing to eventual champions Japan in the semifinal. She turned down a development contract from the New Zealand Warriors Women in the NRLW to commit to a rugby union career.

In 2025, she joined the Blues for her first season of Super Rugby Aupiki.

Sorensen-McGee was named in the Black Ferns squad for the 2025 Pacific Four Series. She scored two tries in her test debut for the Black Ferns against the Wallaroos at McDonald Jones Stadium in Newcastle on 10 May. She was selected again for the July series against the Black Ferns XV and the Wallaroos.

In July 2025, she was named in the Black Ferns squad to the Women's Rugby World Cup. She was named Player of the Match after she scored a hat-trick against Japan in their second World Cup game. She scored another hat-trick in her side's 40–0 victory over Ireland in their final pool match. Sorensen-McGee and Canada's Julia Schell became the only female players to have scored 2 hat tricks in the tournament’s history, both occurring during the 2025 tournament. Sorensen-McGee scored 3 tries in back to back matches against Japan and Ireland. She is one of only three rugby players in history (men’s and women’s) to have achieved 2 hat tricks in one World Cup tournament, the third being former All Black winger Julian Savea in the men’s 2015 World Cup. Sorensen-McGee also finished the 2025 Women's Rugby World Cup with the most tries scored (11), the most line breaks (15), and the leading points scorer with 69 points with her haul of tries and 7 conversions across the tournament.

She was named World Rugby Women's 15s Breakthrough Player of the Year for 2025.

=== Sevens ===
Sorensen-McGee made her international debut for the Black Ferns sevens side during the Dubai leg of the 2025–26 SVNS when she came on as a substitute during pool play against France, during which she kicked a conversion. New Zealand were the eventual winners of the tournament after beating Australia in the final.
