= Nicolás Pueta =

- Born: Nicolás Pueta; October 20, 1983 Buenos Aires, Argentina
- Height: 1.80 m (5 ft 11 in)
- Weight: 82 kg (181 lb)

Rugby union career
- Position: Flanker / Number 8
Amateur team(s)
Years	Team	Apps	(Points)
1997-07	Club San Andres		
2007-08	Whitley Bay Rockcliff RFC		
2008	Maastricht Maraboes		
2009-	Club San Andres		
- Correct as of 15 October 2015

Nicolás Pueta (born October 20, 1983, in Buenos Aires, Argentina) is a rugby union footballer and motivational speaker in Argentina. He plays for Saint Andrew's Former Pupils Club in the Buenos Aires Rugby Union (URBA) League.

== History ==
He was born with a femoral deficiency that meant that his left leg never grew to the same size as his right one. But that never stopped him from sport, specially his ultimate goal of playing rugby. "I've loved the game from the first day. I always accompanied my friends and class-mates to their games. But, when they took the field, I had to stay on the wrong side of the chalk line," said Pueta, whose father was coach and his two younger brothers also play rugby. One day, aged 15, he decided that it was time to give it a go, and despite medical and parental advise not taking no for an answer, he played his first game of rugby.

"I never assumed my handicap and if anything, as a kid not having a leg meant that my arms were much stronger," Pueta added. His right leg is stronger than a tree and he jumps all over the field–like a kangaroo–and will tackle everything that comes his way. His line-out jumping is also an asset to whatever team he plays in.

After getting a diploma in Translation, he travelled to Europe where he played rugby in England, for Whitley Bay Rockcliff Rugby Club where he completed the 2007–08 season. Soon after he moved to Netherlands and had a short spell in Dutch rugby playing for Maastricht Maraboes RC. Before the end of the season he returned to Argentina and his lifetime club, Club San Andres.

He worked in the communications department of Rugby World Cup 2007, and at the conclusion of the tournament, in front of a galaxy of rugby stars, was awarded the prestigious IRB Spirit of Rugby Award for his strength in pursuing his passion of rugby despite physical disadvantages. He repeated his Rugby News Service role in the international stage during the Rugby World Cup 2011 held in New Zealand, the Rugby World Cup 2015 in England and the Rugby World Cup 2019 in Japan.

Upon returning to his country in 2008, the Buenos Aires Rugby Union also awarded him with their Cap, and the television show Leyendas del Rugby (where Argentine rugby legends are recognized) gave him another accolade.

Nicolás currently works in the sports travel industry, and is a motivational speaker, making his audience understand about fighting for one's dreams, overcoming problems and ensuring the goal is reached by putting mind and body to the task.

== Honours ==
Season	Team	Title
2009	(Argentina) Club San Andrés	Promotion to Torneo de la URBA

== Individual ==
- IRB Awards: 1

– Spirit of Rugby Award

- Unión de Rugby de Buenos Aires: 1

– Cap Honorífico
