= Maddison Levi =

Australian rules football player

- Full name: Maddison Jade Levi
- Born: 27 April 2002 (age 24)
- Height: 183 cm (6 ft 0 in)
- Weight: 67 kg (148 lb; 10 st 8 lb)
- School: Miami State High School

Rugby union career
Youth career
- –2019: Miami State High School
Super Rugby
Years	Team	Apps	(Points)
2025	Queensland Reds		(0)
International career
Years	Team	Apps	(Points)
2026–	Australia	1	(0)
- Correct as of 25 Augtust 2026
National sevens team
Years	Team		Comps
2021–	Australia		254 tries 1270 points
Australian rules football career
Personal information
- Original teams: Bond University (QAFLW); Burleigh Bombettes (QFAW)
- Draft: No. 50, 2020 AFL Women's draft
- Position: Forward / Midfielder
Playing career^{1}
Years	Club	Games (Goals)
2021	Gold Coast	8 (3)
- ^{1} Playing statistics correct to the end of 2021.
Career highlights
- Gold Coast leading goalkicker (2021)
Medal record
Women's rugby sevens
Representing Australia
Rugby Sevens World Cup
Gold medal – first place	2022 Cape Town	Team competition
Commonwealth Games
Gold medal – first place	2022 Birmingham	Team competition

Maddison Jade Levi (born 27 April 2002) is a current player for the Australian women's sevens team. She is a former Australian rules footballer, having played for the Gold Coast Suns in the AFL Women's competition (AFLW). She is a two-time Olympian and the fastest Australian woman to score 100 tries on the World Sevens Series, having reached the milestone in just 15 events.

== Early life ==
Levi grew up on the Gold Coast and attended Miami State High School throughout her upbringing where she was a member of their Rugby Sevens Excellence Program. An accomplished junior rugby player, she represented Queensland as well as Australia in junior competitions and was named player of the tournament in the under-17 Youth Rugby Sevens National Championships. In 2018 Levi was asked to play Australian rules football for the first time with Miami High's AFLQ Schools Cup team and went on to play a pivotal role in the school's state championship win that year.

In 2019 she signed up to play club football for the first time with the Burleigh Bombettes and was placed in the Gold Coast Suns' developmental academy. Just months later, Levi was selected to represent Queensland as a bottom ager in the AFL Women's Under 18 National Championships. In 2020 she turned down a contract with Rugby Australia to pursue an AFLW career and switched clubs to play for Bond University in the top level QAFLW competition. Levi cemented her spot in Bond University's senior team in 2020 and was named in the bests multiple times throughout the QAFLW season. As a result of her 2020 performances, she was invited to take part in the AFLW Draft Combine, where she broke multiple national records including the 20-metre sprint and vertical jump.

== AFLW career ==
Levi was drafted to her hometown team, the Gold Coast Suns, with pick 50 in the 2020 AFL Women's draft. She made her AFLW debut for the Suns in Round 1 of the 2021 AFLW season and played every game for the Gold Coast that year while also being named equal leading goalkicker for the team in the 2021 season as well as finishing in the top 10 in the club's best and fairest count in her debut season. It was revealed Levi signed a two-year contract extension with Gold Coast on 10 June 2021, however, she was placed on the Suns' inactive list in October 2021 to pursue a full-time position with the national rugby sevens team.

== Rugby sevens career ==
In July 2021, Levi was announced as a shock inclusion for the Australian national rugby sevens team in the Tokyo Olympics competition at 19 years of age. The team came second in the pool round and was eliminated by Fiji 14-12 in the quarterfinals. She then committed to playing for the national team in the 2021–22 World Rugby Women's Sevens Series where she scored 24 tries on route to Australia securing its third championship which included titles in Canada, Spain and the United Arab Emirates.

Levi won a gold medal with the Australian sevens team at the 2022 Commonwealth Games in Birmingham. She was a member of the Australian team that won the 2022 Sevens Rugby World Cup held in Cape Town, South Africa in September 2022, scoring a hat-trick of tries in the final against New Zealand.

=== 2024 Summer Olympics ===
In 2024, Levi was named in Australia's sevens side for the sevens tournament at the Summer Olympics in Paris. Levi scored a tournament-high 14 tries which also made her the leading points scorer of the tournament. In the group stage, Levi scored 5 tries in the opening match against South Africa, followed by three more against Great Britain and one against Ireland. In the quarter-finals, Levi scored a hat-trick against Ireland. In the semi-finals she scored one try against Canada which was Australia's only try of the match. In the bronze medal match against USA, Levi scored both of Australia's tries. Levi scored 14 of Australia's 24 tries for the tournament. In November 2024, she was named as World Rugby Women's Sevens Player of the Year at the World Rugby Awards.

== Personal life ==
Her sister Teagan Levi also represents Australia in rugby sevens.
