= Jerry Tuwai =

Jerry Tuwai MOF
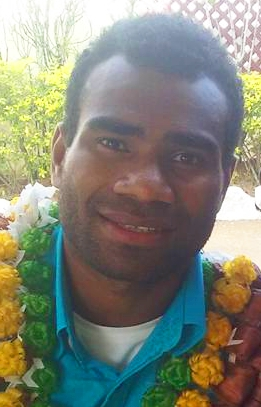
- Tuwai in 2016
- Full name: Seremaia Tuwai Vunisa
- Born: 23 March 1989 (age 37) Suva, Fiji
- Height: 1.70 m (5 ft 7 in)
- Weight: 81 kg (179 lb)

Rugby union career
National sevens team
Years	Team	Comps
2014–	Fiji	
Medal record
Men's rugby sevens
Representing Fiji
Olympic Games
Gold medal – first place	2016 Rio de Janeiro	Team
Gold medal – first place	2020 Tokyo	Team
Silver medal – second place	2024 Paris	Team
Rugby Sevens World Cup
Gold medal – first place	2022 Cape Town	Team competition
Commonwealth Games
Silver medal – second place	2018 Gold Coast	Team competition
Silver medal – second place	2022 Birmingham	Team competition

Seremaia Tuwai Vunisa MOF (born 23 March 1989), also known as Jerry Tuwai, is a Fiji rugby union player who plays for the Fiji national rugby sevens team. Tuwai made his debut for Fiji 7s at the 2014 Gold Coast Sevens. He was part of the Fiji Sevens team that won the gold medal at the 2016 Rio Olympics and the 2020 Tokyo Olympics. He was named World Rugby Sevens Player of the Year in 2019.

He was awarded player of the tournament at the 2014 World Club 7s where he played for the Davetalevu Club. He was also Player of the Final at the 2015 Dubai Sevens. Tuwai was also the stand out player at the 2015 Las Vegas Sevens final when Fiji 7s beat New Zealand 7s 35-19.

== Background ==
Tuwai was born in Newtown, a poor district in the outskirts of Suva, Fiji, to Poasa Vunisa and Seruwaia Vualiku. He was raised in a one bedroom corrugated iron house. Since rugby balls and sporting equipment were relatively expensive, a young Jerry would improvise by using empty water bottles or bundled up t-shirts. In his early teen years, he would often accompany his father for fishing trips and selling their wares by the roadside: a routine which he defines as "a very hard job". He then admits later on, that although he regrets dropping out of school, the rewards of his hard work on the field and back home are an equitable trade.

== Domestic rugby career ==
Tuwai grew up playing rugby in his school, but only took to the sport seriously at 18, after dropping volleyball. At that age he joined Newtown Rugby Club, his local club, where he quickly excelled for his speed and side stepping, which set him apart from the other players, according to his coach at the time, Meli Nakalivadra.

He was subsequently invited to join Marist Rugby Club's Sevens team, against whom he impressed during a match played in Suva. There he played well enough to get in the radar of the national sevens team's coaching staff and was subsequently invited to train with the national sevens squad, but only lasted one camp, before being discarded for being "too small to play international rugby".

== International rugby career ==
After two years, then Fiji Sevens coach Ben Ryan saw him playing in the Marist sevens, the biggest annual club tournament in Fiji, and invited him to train with the national squad, letting him know that he had to work hard on his all-round rugby skills if he was to play for Fiji, citing his low work rate off the ball as an issue to address, while also noting his insufficient training foundations. As a consequence of his lack of fitness, Tuwai would often quit training when it got too hard, even getting to the point where he was hiding in the bushes during sprints in order to skip training.

As Ryan recalls, "He was painfully shy. For a week I don’t think he uttered a word to anyone. And he was dreadfully unfit, with apparently minimal motivation to improve. He couldn’t get through a single training session without breaking down exhausted. A lot of the time he wouldn’t even turn up for a training session (...) He was full of excuses: I couldn’t get to training, I missed the bus; I was ill, I couldn’t move. When we did fitness drills in the sessions he did get to, his chin would always be on his chest as he ran. When he wasn’t running he was hiding in the bushes. He couldn’t understand the intensity of the work we were doing and he couldn’t connect it with the rugby that he loved to play. "

Despite this, Ryan saw his potential and took him under his wing in order for him to thrive in the ultra-competitive environment of professional sport, from fitness to nutrition, rest and mental skills. Tuwai credits Ryan for changing his mindset and preparing him for the rigours of being a professional rugby player and helping him get to that next level mentally and physically.

He made his debut for Fiji Sevens at the 2014 Gold Coast Sevens in Australia. His performance was praised by Ryan, saying that it was one of the best debuts that he had ever seen from a Sevens player. By the end of the season, he was named the best rookie of the sevens circuit season by World Rugby.

Tuwai was an integral part of the Fiji Sevens squad that competed at the 2016 Summer Olympics, where they beat Brasil, the USA, Argentina, New Zealand and Japan to qualify for the Olympic Rugby Sevens final, where they beat Great Britain by 43-7. It was the first time Fiji had won an Olympic medal, and gave the whole country something to cheer on after the devastation caused by Cyclone Winston, which hit Fiji in february of that same year.

Tuwai was part of the Fiji sevens team that won a silver medal at the 2022 Commonwealth Games. He also won a gold medal at the 2022 Rugby World Cup Sevens in Cape Town.

He was part of the Fijian side that won a silver medal at the 2024 Summer Olympics in Paris becoming the most decorated Olympian in Fiji's history.

== Playing style ==
Tuwai is known for his agility, sharp decision-making and his ability to step defenders without losing speed. He's also notable for his commitment for the physical side of the game, being a force at the breakdown and making an impact with his defence, despite being small for an average professional rugby player. This has led Fiji Sevens legend Waisale Serevi to declare that Tuwai's even a better player than he was in his prime

== Personal life ==
Tuwai credits his parents for his achievements on the rugby field, and cites them as his main motivation to perform and achieve accolades in rugby. When he was young, Tuwai's parents saved enough money to buy him his first pair of rugby boots. As she handed them over Tuwai's mother told him "this is your knife and fork". Tuwai declared "I did not know my Mum was saving some money for my rugby boots. I couldn’t believe it because I knew they weren’t earning big money. They bought me these boots and my mum told me 'this is your life – this is your knife and your fork.' It really touched me and from that time until now I always write on my boots when I am about to play – knife and fork. "When I get tired and want to give up, I just picture our house and my parents and me working for them. I just picture my Mom working and my Dad working hard on the farm."

Tuwai has credited his parents for keeping him grounded and humble. He goes back regularly to Newtown, the place where he grew up. A religious and upstanding man, Jerry hopes that his accomplishments will inspire the younger generation of his hometown.
