= Vernon Pugh Award for Distinguished Service =

- Awarded for: Outstanding service to their country and contribution to the International Game
- Date: 2001; 25 years ago
- Presented by: World Rugby
- First award: 2001
- Currently held by: (Georgia (country)) George Nijaradze (2023)

The Vernon Pugh Award for Distinguished Service, previously called the IRB Distinguished Service Award, is awarded by World Rugby at the World Rugby Awards. It has been awarded annually since 2001. It honours an individual, Union or group, male or female, who has given outstanding service to their country and contributed to the International Game in as many as possible of the following areas: Playing, Coaching, Management, Training, Administration, Media & Broadcast.

== Recipients ==
Year	Recipient	Ref
2001	(Republic of Ireland) Tom Kiernan	
2002	(Scotland) Alan Hosie	
2003	(New Zealand) Bob Stuart	
2004	(Republic of Ireland) Ronnie Dawson	
2005	(Australia) Peter Crittle	
2006	(New Zealand) Brian Lochore	
2007	(Spain) José María Epalza	
2008	(Australia) Nicholas Shehadie	
2009	(Republic of Ireland) Noel Murphy	
2010	(France) Jean-Claude Baqué	
2011	(New Zealand) Jock Hobbs	
2012	(Romania) Viorel Morariu	
2013	(South Africa) Ian McIntosh	
2014	(Wales) Ray Williams	
2015	(England) Nigel Starmer-Smith	
2016	(Republic of Ireland) Syd Millar	
2017	(France) Marcel Martin	
2018	(Japan) Yoshirō Mori	
2019	(France) Bernard Lapasset	
2021	(France) Jacques Laurans	
2022	(New Zealand) Dr. Farah Palmer	
2023	(Georgia (country)) George Nijaradze	
