= World Rugby Women's Sevens Player of the Year =

- Awarded for: Best Women's Sevens Player of the Year
- Sponsored by: HSBC
- Date: 2013; 13 years ago
- Presented by: World Rugby
- First award: 2013
- Currently held by: (New Zealand) Jorja Miller (2026)
- Website: HSBC SVNS

The World Rugby Women's Sevens Player of the Year is awarded annually at the World Rugby Awards by World Rugby. The award is based on the player's performance during the Women's SVNS tournament along with other international sevens tournaments during the year.

== Winners and nominees ==
Year	Image	Winning player	Other nominees	Ref(s)
2013		(New Zealand) Kayla McAlister	(Canada) Jennifer Kish (Netherlands) Kelly van Harskamp	
2014	—N/a	(Australia) Emilee Cherry	(Australia) Charlotte Caslick (New Zealand) Sarah Hirini (New Zealand) Kayla McAlister	
2015		(New Zealand) Portia Woodman	(Australia) Charlotte Caslick (New Zealand) Sarah Hirini (Russia) Nadezhda Kudinova	
2016		(Australia) Charlotte Caslick	(England) Emily Scarratt (New Zealand) Portia Woodman	
2017		(New Zealand) Michaela Blyde	(Canada) Ghislaine Landry (New Zealand) Ruby Tui	
2018		(New Zealand) Michaela Blyde	(New Zealand) Sarah Hirini (New Zealand) Portia Woodman	
2019		(New Zealand) Ruby Tui	(New Zealand) Sarah Hirini (New Zealand) Tyla Nathan-Wong	
2021		(France) Anne-Cécile Ciofani	(New Zealand) Sarah Hirini (Fiji) Alowesi Nakoci (Fiji) Reapi Uluinisau	
2022		(Australia) Charlotte Caslick	(Australia) Maddison Levi (Republic of Ireland) Amee-Leigh Murphy Crowe (Australia) Faith Nathan	
2023		(New Zealand) Tyla Nathan-Wong	(New Zealand) Michaela Blyde (Australia) Maddison Levi (Fiji) Reapi Ulunisau	
2024	—N/a	(Australia) Maddison Levi	(New Zealand) Michaela Blyde (New Zealand) Jorja Miller	
2025		(New Zealand) Jorja Miller	(Brazil) Thalia Costa (Australia) Maddison Levi	
2026		(New Zealand) Jorja Miller	(Australia) Maddison Levi (United States) Ariana Ramsey	

=== Winners with multiple nominations ===
Player	Wins	Nominations
(Australia) Charlotte Caslick	2 (2016, 2022)	4 (2014, 2015, 2016, 2022)
(New Zealand) Michaela Blyde	2 (2017, 2018)	3 (2017, 2018, 2023)
(New Zealand) Jorja Miller	2 (2025, 2026)	3 (2024, 2025, 2026)
(Australia) Maddison Levi	1 (2024)	5 (2022, 2023, 2024, 2025, 2026)
(New Zealand) Tyla Nathan-Wong	1 (2023)	2 (2023, 2019)
(New Zealand) Portia Woodman	1 (2015)	2 (2015, 2018)
(New Zealand) Kayla McAlister	1 (2013)	2 (2013, 2014)
