= World Rugby Referee Award =

- Awarded for: Distinguished long-term service to the game and refereeing
- Date: 2001; 25 years ago
- Presented by: World Rugby
- Formerly called: IRB Referee Award for Distinguished Service (2001–2014)
- First award: 2001
- Currently held by: (Scotland) Hollie Davidson (2025)
- Website: World Rugby

The World Rugby Referee Award (previously called IRB Referee Award for Distinguished Service) honours referees with a distinguished long-term service to the game and refereeing.

== Recipients ==
Year	Winner	Refs
2001	(England) Ed Morrison	
2002	(New Zealand) Colin Hawke	
2003	(Wales) Derek Bevan	
2004	(Scotland) Jim Fleming	
2005	(New Zealand) Paddy O'Brien	
2006	(Australia) Peter Marshall	
2007	(Australia) Dick Byres	
2008	(South Africa) André Watson	
2009	(France) Francis Palmade	
2010	(England) Colin High	
2011	(New Zealand) Keith Lawrence	
2012	(South Africa) Paul Dobson	
2013	(France) Michel Lamoulie	
2014	(New Zealand) Bob Francis	
2015	(Wales) Nigel Owens	
2016	(Spain) Alhambra Nievas	
2016	(South Africa) Rasta Rasivhenge	
2017	(Ireland) Joy Neville	
2018	(Australia) Angus Gardner	
2019	(England) Wayne Barnes	
2020	No award presented	
2021	(Australia) Andrew Cole	
2022	(South Africa) Tappe Henning	
2023	(Ireland) David McHugh	
2024	No award presented	
2025	(Scotland) Hollie Davidson	
