= World Rugby Team of the Year =

- Presented by: World Rugby
- First award: 2001
- Final award: 2019

The World Rugby Team of the Year is awarded by the World Rugby in the spring each year. From 2004 to 2007, the award was called the IRB International Team of the Year. In 2017 the New Zealand Black Ferns became the first women's team to win the award beating nominees England and the All Blacks.

== List of winners ==
Year	Winner
2001	Australia
2002	France
2003	England
2004	South Africa
2005	New Zealand
2006	New Zealand
2007	South Africa
2008	New Zealand
2009	South Africa
2010	New Zealand
2011	New Zealand
2012	New Zealand
2013	New Zealand
2014	New Zealand
2015	New Zealand
2016	New Zealand
2017	New Zealand (women's)
2018	Ireland
2019	South Africa
