= World Rugby Men's 15s Player of the Year =

- Date: 2001; 25 years ago
- Presented by: World Rugby
- Formerly called: IRB Player of the Year (2001–2013); World Rugby Player of the Year (2014–2019)
- First award: 2001
- Current holder: (South Africa) Malcolm Marx (2025)

Highlights
- Most awards: (New Zealand) Dan Carter (New Zealand) Richie McCaw (3 awards each)
- Website: World Rugby

The World Rugby Men's 15s Player of the Year is an award presented annually by World Rugby at the World Rugby Awards. It is given to honour "the achievements of those involved at the highest level of the world game on the field". First presented in 2001, it was initially named the IRB International Player of the Year; from 2007 until 2014 it was the IRB Player of the Year and in 2014 it was titled World Rugby Player of the Year, before being given its current name in 2016.

The winner receives a trophy at an annual awards ceremony. The voting panel select a list of nominees who can then be voted for by players, coaches, media representatives and the public via Twitter. Informed by the vote, the panel then select the winner. as of 2021 the voting panel comprises John Smit, George Gregan, Melodie Robinson, Maggie Alphonsi, Clive Woodward, Brian O'Driscoll, Richie McCaw, Thierry Dusautoir and Fiona Coghlan.

The first winner of the award was Ireland hooker Keith Wood. The winner for 2025 is South African hooker Malcolm Marx. New Zealand players have received the most awards, winning ten times. Two players have won three times – flanker Richie McCaw (2006, 2009 and 2010) and fly-half Dan Carter (2005, 2012 and 2015). Nominations for the award are dominated by players from Tier 1 nations; only United States' Joe Taufete'e has ever been nominated from a Tier 2 side. Flankers have won the award most often, with eight wins, followed by fly-halves with seven.

== Winners and nominees ==
Winners and nominees of the World Rugby Men's 15s Player of the Year
Year	Image	Winner	Country	Position	Other nominees	Ref(s)
2001	Keith Wood in 2012	Keith Wood	Ireland	Hooker	Australia – George Gregan (Scrum-half); Australia – George Smith (Flanker); England – Jonny Wilkinson (Fly-half); Ireland – Brian O'Driscoll (Centre)	
2002	Fabien Galthié in 2008	Fabien Galthié	France	Scrum-half	England – Jason Robinson (Wing); Ireland – Brian O'Driscoll (Centre); New Zealand – Richie McCaw (Flanker); South Africa – Joe van Niekerk (Flanker)	
2003	Jonny Wilkinson in 2007	Jonny Wilkinson	England	Fly-half	Australia – Phil Waugh (Flanker); England – Steve Thompson (Hooker); France – Imanol Harinordoquy (Number 8); New Zealand – Richie McCaw (Flanker)	
2004	Schalk Burger in 2008	Schalk Burger	South Africa	Flanker	Australia – Matt Giteau (Centre); France – Serge Betsen (Flanker); Ireland – Gordon D'Arcy (Centre); South Africa – Marius Joubert (Centre)	
2005	Dan Carter in 2011	Dan Carter	New Zealand	Fly-half	New Zealand – Richie McCaw (Flanker); New Zealand – Tana Umaga (Centre); South Africa – Bryan Habana (Wing); South Africa – Victor Matfield (Lock)	
2006	Richie McCaw in 2008	Richie McCaw	New Zealand	Flanker	Australia – Chris Latham (Full-back); Ireland – Paul O'Connell (Lock); New Zealand – Dan Carter (Fly-half); South Africa – Fourie du Preez (Scrum-half)	
2007	Bryan Habana in 2007	Bryan Habana	South Africa	Wing	Argentina – Felipe Contepomi (Centre); Argentina – Juan Martín Hernández (Fly-half); France – Yannick Jauzion (Centre); New Zealand – Richie McCaw (Flanker)	
2008	Shane Williams in 2008	Shane Williams	Wales	Wing	Italy – Sergio Parisse (Number 8); New Zealand – Dan Carter (Fly-half); Scotland – Mike Blair (Scrum-half); Wales – Ryan Jones (Number 8)	
2009	Richie McCaw in 2011	Richie McCaw	New Zealand	Flanker	Australia – Matt Giteau (Fly-half); England – Tom Croft (Flanker); Ireland – Jamie Heaslip (Number 8); Ireland – Brian O'Driscoll (Centre); South Africa – Fourie du Preez (Scrum-half); South Africa – François Steyn (Centre)	
2010	Richie McCaw in 2011	Richie McCaw	New Zealand	Flanker	Australia – Kurtley Beale (Centre); Australia – David Pocock (Flanker); France – Imanol Harinordoquy (Number 8); New Zealand – Mils Muliaina (Full-back); South Africa – Victor Matfield (Lock)	
2011	Thierry Dusautoir in 2012	Thierry Dusautoir	France	Flanker	Australia – Will Genia (Scrum-half); Australia – David Pocock (Flanker); New Zealand – Jerome Kaino (Flanker); New Zealand – Ma'a Nonu (Centre); New Zealand – Piri Weepu (Scrum-half)	
2012	Dan Carter in 2011	Dan Carter	New Zealand	Fly-half	England – Owen Farrell (Fly-half); France – Frédéric Michalak (Fly-half); New Zealand – Richie McCaw (Flanker)	
2013	Kieran Read in 2011	Kieran Read	New Zealand	Number 8	Italy – Sergio Parisse (Number 8); New Zealand – Ben Smith (Full-back); South Africa – Eben Etzebeth (Lock); Wales – Leigh Halfpenny (Full-back)	
2014	Brodie Retallick in 2014	Brodie Retallick	New Zealand	Lock	Ireland – Johnny Sexton (Fly-half); New Zealand – Julian Savea (Wing); South Africa – Willie le Roux (Full-back); South Africa – Duane Vermeulen (Number 8)	
2015	Dan Carter in 2015	Dan Carter	New Zealand	Fly-half	Australia – Michael Hooper (Flanker); Australia – David Pocock (Flanker); New Zealand – Julian Savea (Wing); Scotland – Greig Laidlaw (Scrum-half); Wales – Alun Wyn Jones (Lock)	
2016	Beauden Barrett in 2014	Beauden Barrett	New Zealand	Fly-half	England – Owen Farrell (Fly-half); England – Maro Itoje (Lock); England – Billy Vunipola (Number 8); Ireland – Jamie Heaslip (Number 8); New Zealand – Dane Coles (Hooker)	
2017	Beauden Barrett in 2017	Beauden Barrett	New Zealand	Fly-half	Australia – Israel Folau (Full-back); England – Owen Farrell (Fly-half); England – Maro Itoje (Lock); New Zealand – Rieko Ioane (Wing)	
2018	Johnny Sexton in 2015	Johnny Sexton	Ireland	Fly-half	New Zealand – Beauden Barrett (Fly-half); New Zealand – Rieko Ioane (Wing); South Africa – Faf de Klerk (Scrum-half); South Africa – Malcolm Marx (Hooker)	
2019		Pieter-Steph du Toit	South Africa	Flanker	England – Tom Curry (Flanker); New Zealand – Ardie Savea (Flanker); South Africa – Cheslin Kolbe (Wing); United States – Joe Taufete'e (Hooker); Wales – Alun Wyn Jones (Lock)	
2020	Not Awarded					
2021	Antoine Dupont in 2023	Antoine Dupont	France	Scrum-half	Australia – Michael Hooper (Flanker); England – Maro Itoje (Lock); Australia – Samu Kerevi (Centre)	
2022	Josh van der Flier in 2023	Josh van der Flier	Ireland	Flanker	South Africa – Lukhanyo Am (Centre); France – Antoine Dupont (Scrum-half); Ireland – Johnny Sexton (Fly-half)	
2023	Ardie Savea in 2018	Ardie Savea	New Zealand	Number 8	South Africa – Eben Etzebeth (Lock); France – Antoine Dupont (Scrum-half); Ireland – Bundee Aki (Centre)	
2024		Pieter-Steph du Toit	South Africa	Flanker	Ireland – Caelan Doris (Number 8); South Africa – Eben Etzebeth (Lock); South Africa – Cheslin Kolbe (Wing)	
2025	Malcolm Marx in 2021	Malcolm Marx	South Africa	Hooker	France – Louis Bielle-Biarrey (Wing); South Africa – Pieter-Steph du Toit (Flanker); South Africa – Ox Nche (Prop)	

== Statistics ==
Correct as of the 2024 awards

Multiple wins
3	Dan Carter	New Zealand
3	Richie McCaw	New Zealand
2	Beauden Barrett	New Zealand
2	Pieter-Steph du Toit	South Africa

Wins by position
8	Flanker
7	Fly-half
2	Hooker
2	Number 8
2	Scrum-half
2	Wing
1	Lock

Multiple nominations including wins
8	Richie McCaw	New Zealand
5	Dan Carter	New Zealand
3	Beauden Barrett	New Zealand
3	Antoine Dupont	France
3	Pieter-Steph du Toit	South Africa
3	Eben Etzebeth	South Africa
3	Owen Farrell	England
3	Maro Itoje	England
3	Brian O'Driscoll	Ireland
3	David Pocock	Australia
3	Johnny Sexton	Ireland
2	Fourie du Preez	South Africa
2	Matt Giteau	Australia
2	Bryan Habana	South Africa
2	Imanol Harinordoquy	France
2	Jamie Heaslip	Ireland
2	Michael Hooper	Australia
2	Rieko Ioane	New Zealand
2	Alun Wyn Jones	Wales
2	Cheslin Kolbe	South Africa
2	Malcolm Marx	South Africa
2	Victor Matfield	South Africa
2	Sergio Parisse	Italy
2	Ardie Savea	New Zealand
2	Julian Savea	New Zealand
2	Jonny Wilkinson	England

=== By country ===
Winners by country
11	New Zealand
5	South Africa
3	France
3	Ireland
1	England
1	Wales

Nominations including wins by country
31	New Zealand
25	South Africa
15	Australia
14	Ireland
13	England
9	France
5	Wales
2	Argentina
2	Italy
2	Scotland
1	United States

=== By club ===
Multiple wins
7	Crusaders	New Zealand
3	Hurricanes	New Zealand
2	Leinster	Ireland
2	Toulouse	France
2	Stormers	South Africa

Multiple nominations including wins
14	Crusaders	New Zealand
11	Hurricanes	New Zealand
11	Leinster	Ireland
7	Saracens	England
6	Toulouse	France
6	Bulls	South Africa
5	Stormers	South Africa
5	Sharks	South Africa
4	Stade Français	France
4	Ospreys	Wales
4	Brumbies	Australia
4	Waratahs	Australia
3	Blues	New Zealand
3	Force	Australia
3	Sale Sharks	England
2	Chiefs	New Zealand
2	Newcastle Falcons	England
2	Toyota Verblitz	Japan
2	Biarritz	France
2	Lions	South Africa
2	Reds	Australia
2	Tokyo Sungoliath	Japan
