= Rugby union trophies and awards =

List of rugby union awards

Rugby union trophies and awards have been given out to teams and participants from the very earliest days of the sport's history. In common with many other sports rugby union has an array of competitions, both domestic international, covering the spectrum of competition structures from season long leagues, to one-off matches. The list below is divided into sections such that trophies and awards competed for by national sides are grouped together, as are those competed for by club and provincial sides. In both cases, the type of award can differ. The award might be a perpetual trophy, which is one competed for in perpetuity by two sides such that on each occasion they meet, which may or may not be on a regular basis, that honour is contested. The award may be one that is given to the winner of a tournament, or as a subset of this, as an award for a particular honour attained in that tournament. Additionally, the sport of rugby union bestows certain honours on individual players, and these too have their own dedicated section below.

== International Trophies ==
=== Current international ===
Rugby union international trophies
Name of trophy	First Contested	Last Contested	Type	Record	Current holders	Notes
Webb Ellis Cup	1987	2023	Tournament Trophy	Only winning sides listed: South Africa – 4 New Zealand – 3 Australia – 2 England – 1	South Africa	Trophy received for winning the Rugby World Cup. Named after William Webb Ellis, who supposedly invented the sport
Melrose Cup	1993	2022	Tournament Trophy	Only winning sides listed: Fiji – 3 New Zealand – 3 England – 1 Wales – 1	Fiji	The main prize of the Rugby World Cup Sevens
Six Nations Championship Trophy	2000	2026	Tournament Trophy	England – 7 France – 8 Wales – 6 Ireland – 6 Italy – 0 Scotland – 0	France	The trophy received for winning the Six Nations Championship
Triple Crown	1883	2026	Tournament Honour	England – 26; Wales – 22; Ireland – 15; Scotland – 10	Ireland	The Triple Crown as a term was first recorded in 1884. The cup was known as the invisible cup because no trophy existed until one was commissioned in 2006.
Calcutta Cup	1879	2026	Perpetual Trophy	England – 72; Scotland – 45 drawn – 16	Scotland	Named after the Calcutta Football Club which withdrew the club's Silver Rupees from the bank, and had them melted down and made into a cup which they presented to the RFU in 1878 to be competed for annually.
Millennium Trophy	1988	2026	Perpetual Trophy	England– 21; Ireland – 18 drawn – 0	Ireland	Contested as part of the Six Nations Championship. It was initiated in 1988 as part of Dublin's millennial celebrations. The trophy in the shape of a horned Viking helmet.
Centenary Quaich	1989	2026	Perpetual Trophy	Ireland – 23; Scotland – 14 drawn – 1	Ireland	Awarded as part of the Six Nations Championship. Although the two countries have played each other on 121, the cup has only been presented to the winners of the fixture since 1989.
Giuseppe Garibaldi Trophy	2006	2026	Perpetual Trophy	France – 17; Italy – 2 drawn – 1	France	Awarded as part of the Six Nations Championship. The trophy, designed by former French international and professional sculptor Jean-Pierre Rives, was awarded for the first time on 3 February 2007 to France as part of the celebrations of the bicentenary of the birth of Italian national hero Giuseppe Garibaldi in Nice.
Auld Alliance Trophy	2018	2026	Perpetual Trophy	France – 5 Scotland – 4	Scotland	Awarded as part of the Six Nations Championship. The trophy commemorates the French and Scottish rugby players who were killed during the conflict, in particular the captains of the two nations in the last matches played before the First World War – Eric Milroy (Scotland) and Marcel Burgun (France).
Doddie Weir Cup	2018	2026	Perpetual Trophy	Wales – 4 Scotland – 5	Scotland	The cup was created to bring awareness to Motor Neurone Disease. Former Scotland international lock Doddie Weir was diagnosed with illness and the cup was named in his honour.
Cuttitta Cup	2022	2026	Perpetual Trophy	Scotland – 3 Italy – 2	Italy	The Trophy is to commemorate Massimo Cuttitta, a former Italian captain and Scotland scrum coach, who died of COVID-19 in 2021 aged 54.
Rugby Championship trophy	2012	2025	Tournament Trophy	New Zealand – 9 Australia – 1 South Africa – 3 Argentina – 0	South Africa	The trophy received for winning The Rugby Championship
Bledisloe Cup	1931	2025	Perpetual Trophy	New Zealand – 53; Australia – 12	New Zealand	Named after Lord Bledisloe, the former Governor-General of New Zealand who donated the trophy in 1931.
Mandela Challenge Plate	2000	2025	Perpetual Trophy	Australia – 13; South Africa – 9	South Africa	Named after South Africa's first post-apartheid president, Nelson Mandela.
Freedom Cup	2004	2024	Perpetual Trophy	New Zealand – 16; South Africa – 4	South Africa	The trophy is contested between South Africa and New Zealand, during the Tri-nations tournament. It was first contested in 2004, the 10 year anniversary of South African democracy.
Puma Trophy	2000	2026	Perpetual Trophy	Australia – 14; Argentina – 3	Australia	
Trophée des Bicentenaires	1989	2026	Perpetual Trophy	Australia – 14; France – 9	France	To celebrate the bi-centenaries of Australia and the French Revolution, in 1988 and 1989 respectively, the French Rugby Union donated the Trophée des Bicentenaires to be played in perpetuity between the two countries. It is a bronze sculpture featuring two players in a tackle. Although the trophy dates from 1988, it was first contested in 1989.
Ella–Mobbs Trophy	2022	2026	Perpetual Trophy	Australia – 1 England – 3	England	Cup named after Mark Ella and Edgar Mobbs. Replaced the Cook Cup.
Hopetoun Cup	1998	2025	Perpetual Trophy	Australia – 8 Scotland – 7	Scotland	Named after the Seventh Earl of Hopetoun, a Scotsman, who, as the then Governor-General of Australia, presided over the Federation of Australia in 1901.
Lansdowne Cup	1999	2026	Perpetual Trophy	Ireland – 9 Australia – 8	Ireland	Donated by the Lansdowne Club of Sydney, which was named after Lansdowne Road, the home of Ireland rugby for over a century until its demolition in 2007 to make way for Aviva Stadium.
James Bevan Trophy	2007	2024	Perpetual Trophy	Australia – 13; Wales – 3	Australia	
Dave Gallaher Trophy	2000	2026	Perpetual Trophy	New Zealand – 14; France – 3	New Zealand	Named after Dave Gallaher, the famous 1905–06 All Blacks captain who was killed in Belgium during World War I. Introduced in 2000, it is awarded to the winner of a selected challenge match in any given year.
Hillary Shield	2008	2022	Perpetual Trophy	New Zealand – 8 England – 1	New Zealand	The trophy is named in memory of the New Zealand mountaineer and explorer, Sir Edmund Hillary.
Prince William Cup	2007	2022	Perpetual Trophy	South Africa – 9 Wales – 3	South Africa	Celebrates 100 years of rugby union history between Wales and South Africa. It is named after the Vice Royal Patron of the WRU, Prince William.
Admiral Brown Cup	2012	2026	Perpetual Trophy	Ireland – 7 Argentina – 0	Ireland	Admiral Guillermo Brown was born in 1777 in Foxford, County Mayo. He emigrated at an early age, first to Philadelphia and then to Buenos Aires. He led the Argentinean navy in the wars for independence against the Spanish and Brazilian empires. The Republic of Argentina honors this Irishman as a national hero and many cities, partidos, streets and parks, including clubs and sports stadiums throughout Argentina are named in his honour.
Tom Richards Trophy	2001	2013	Perpetual Trophy	Australia – 1 Lions – 1	Lions	
British & Irish Lions–South Africa Series Trophy	2009	2021	Perpetual Trophy	South Africa – 2 Lions – 0	South Africa	
Lions Series Trophy	2025	2025	Perpetual Trophy	Lions – 1 Australia – 0 New Zealand – South Africa –	Lions	A new trophy created ahead of the 2025 Lions tour of Australia. This new trophy will be contested in all upcoming Lions series.
Killik Cup	2009	2016	Perpetual Trophy	Barbarians – 5 Int. sides – 5 Drawn – 1	Barbarians; South Africa (Shared result)	
Douglas Horn Trophy	2008	2018	Perpetual Trophy	Scotland – 3 Canada – 0	Scotland	Douglas Horn is the Father of Alan Horn, a board member of Rugby Canada, while the trophy is essentially to recognize the long-standing relationship between Canada and Scotland in both the rugby world and international relations.
Antim Cup	2002	2026	Perpetual Trophy	Georgia – 20; Romania – 6	Georgia	Named after Anthim the Iberian, a native of Georgia who became one of the most important Orthodox ecclesiastical figures in Wallachia, one of the predecessor states of modern Romania.
Asian Rugby Championship	1969 / 2015	2026	Tournament Trophy	Only winning sides listed: Japan – 25; South Korea – 5 Hong Kong – 7	Hong Kong	Annual international rugby union competition held in Asia. This tournament had previously existed, between 1969 and 2007, but was changed to the now defunct Asian Five Nations. The competition was brought back in 2015, with a changed format. The overall champion is dictated by who wins the Tri Nations tournament, despite there being divisions below the Tri Nations.
Pacific Nations Cup	2006	2026	Tournament Trophy	Only winning sides listed: Fiji – 7 Japan – 4 Junior All Blacks – 3 Samoa – 4 Māori – 1	Fiji	
South American Rugby Championship	1951	2025	Tournament Trophy	Only winning sides listed: Argentina – 29; Uruguay – 5 Chile – 1 Brazil – 1 Argentina XV – 7	Uruguay	Annual international rugby union competition held in South America. The overall champion is dictated by who wins the Division A tournament.
Americas Rugby Championship	2009	2026	Tournament Trophy	Only winning sides listed: Argentina XV – 7 United States – 2 Chile – 1	Chile	
Africa Cup	2000	2025	Tournament Trophy	Only winning sides listed: Namibia – 9 SA Amateurs – 3 Zimbabwe – 3 Kenya – 2 Morocco – 2 Uganda – 1	Zimbabwe	Organised by the Confederation of African Rugby (CAR), the tournament prior to being renamed the Africa Cup in 2006, was known as the CAR Top 9 and CAR Top 10. The over winner is dictated by who wins the top division, despite there being divisions below Division 1.
Pershing Cup	2014	2025	Perpetual Trophy	United States – 4 Romania – 2	Romania	Named after General John J. Pershing, for organizing the Inter-Allied Games, where a Romanian team, selected from members of the military, played the first ever international test for Romania, the first match being played against the Americans.
Kiselyov Cup	2021	2021	Perpetual Trophy	Russia – 1 Romania – 0	Russia	Named after count Pavel Kiselyov, the leader of Danubian Principalities and commander of Russian troops in Wallachia and Moldavia
Siam Cup	1920	2020	Perpetual Trophy	Jersey – 62; Guernsey – 16 drawn – 1	Jersey	Made from coinage of Siam ticals at the behest of King Rama VI within the Royal Crown Silversmith

=== Past international trophies ===
Rugby union international trophies
Name of trophy	First Contested	Year ceased	Type	Record	Last holders	Notes
Home Nations Championship Trophy	1883 / 1932	1910 / 1939	Tournament Trophy	Scotland – 11; Wales – 11; England – 9 Ireland – 8	England; Ireland; Wales	The final edition of this tournament in its Home Nations format was in 1939, although it did change in 1932 with the addition of France. Although France withdrew from the competition in 1931 reducing it back to just the Home Nations. France re-entered in 1947, with the tournament returning to the Five Nations Championship format.
Five Nations Championship Trophy	1910 / 1947	1931 / 1999	Tournament Trophy	England – 23; Wales – 23; France – 20; Ireland – 11; Scotland – 11	Scotland	The final edition of this tournament in its Five Nations format was in 1999. Although, it did cease in 1931 when France withdrew from the tournament, but re-entered in 1947.
Tri Nations Trophy	1996	2011	Tournament Trophy	New Zealand – 10; Australia – 3 South Africa – 3	Australia	The final edition of this tournament in its original format was in 2011. With Argentina's entry in 2012, the tournament was renamed The Rugby Championship.
ARFU Asian Rugby Series	2003	2007	Tournament Trophy	Only winning sides listed: Japan – 3 South Korea – 1	Japan	The final edition of this tournament was in 2007, when the ARFU combined the then Asian Rugby Championship with this tournament to create the now defunct Asian Five Nations.
Churchill Cup	2003	2011	Tournament Trophy	Only winning sides listed: England A – 6 Māori – 2 Ireland Wolfhounds – 1	England A	The tournament, whose final edition was held in 2011, was contested by teams from Canada, England, and the United States, and other invited teams. It was named after former British Prime Minister Winston Churchill. Churchill's mother, Jennie Jerome was an American, born in Brooklyn.
Asian Five Nations	2008	2014	Tournament Trophy	Only winning sides listed: Japan – 7	Japan	The final edition of this tournament was in 2014, when the ARFU changed the format and rebranded the competition.
Cornwall Cup	2008	2008	Perpetual Trophy	Australia – 1 Barbarians – 0	Australia	
Ustinov Cup	2014	2014	Perpetual Trophy	Russia – 1 Hong Kong – 0	Russia	Replaced by World Rugby Cup of Nations with Russia joining the cup
Autumn Nations Cup	2020	2020	Tournament Trophy	Only winning sides listed: England – 1	England	A one-off tournament played to replace the 2020 end of year internationals due to the effects of the COVID-19 pandemic
European Nations Cup	2000	2016	Tournament Trophy	Only winning sides listed: Georgia – 9 Romania – 4 Portugal – 1	Georgia	European Championship for tier 2 and tier 3 rugby union nations, with winners of each division promoted up to the next and loser demoted down. The overall winner is dictated by who wins the 1A division, despite there being divisions below 1A.
CONSUR Cup	2014	2016	Tournament Trophy	Only winning sides listed: Argentina – 3	Argentina	Annual rugby union tournament held in South America, where the top 2 teams from the South American Rugby Championship, play CONSUR leading team, Argentina.
World Rugby Pacific Challenge	2006	2024	Tournament Trophy	Only winning sides listed: Fiji Warriors – 10; Savaii Samoa – 2 (Tonga) Tautahi Gold – 1 (Argentina) Pampas XV – 2 Junior Japan – 2	Fiji Warriors	Organised by World Rugby, the tournament prior to being renamed the Pacific Challenge in 2015, was known as the Pacific Rugby Cup. National 'A' teams from the Asia-Pacific region have competed for the trophy since 2011. From 2006 to 2010, two selected representative sides from each of Fiji, Samoa, and Tonga played for the cup.
Elgon Cup	2004		Perpetual Trophy			
Victoria Cup	2010		Tournament Trophy			
CAR Castel Beer Trophy			Tournament Trophy			
PARA Pan American Championship			Tournament Trophy			
Cook Cup	1997	2021	Perpetual Trophy	Australia – 10; England – 13	England	Cup named after Captain James Cook. Retired and replaced by the Ella-Mobbs Cup for the 2022 England Tour of Australia

== International Honours not represented by Trophies ==
Rugby union Honours
Name of trophy	First Contested	Last Contested	Type	Participants (no. of wins in brackets)	Current holders	Notes
Le Crunch	1906	2023	Perpetual Contest	England – 60; France – 43 drawn – 7	France	This is merely a traditional name for the tie. There is no physical trophy.
Grand Slam		2023	Tournament Honour	England – 13; Wales – 12; France – 10; Ireland – 4 Scotland – 3 Italy – 0	Ireland	
Wooden Spoon		2023	Tournament Honour	Ireland – 25; Scotland – 24; England – 19; Italy – 18; Wales – 17; France – 13	Wales	This is "awarded" to the team that finishes the Six Nations Championship at the bottom of the table.

== Domestic and Club Trophies ==
=== Current Domestic and Club Trophies ===
Rugby union domestic and club trophies
Name of trophy	First Contested	Last Contested	Type	Image	Record	Current holders	Notes
United Hospitals Challenge Cup	1874	2022	Tournament	–	GKT RFC – 51; Imperial Medicals RFC – 51; Barts and The London RFC – 25; St George's RFC – 3 RUMS RFC – 2 Royal Vets RFC – 0	Barts and The London RFC	The United Hospitals Challenge Cup is contested by the six medical schools in London and is most notable for being the oldest rugby cup competition in the world.
Waratah Shield	1963	2016	Tournament		For record of Waratah Shield champions, see Waratah Shield#Number of victories	St Augustine's College	The Waratah Shield is a knock-out competition for high school teams from New South Wales, Australia.
Shute Shield	1923	2022	Domestic		For record of Shute Shield champions, see Shute Shield#Premiership results	Sydney Uni	The Shute Shield is awarded to the winning team from the Sydney premiership grand final held at the end of the club rugby season.
Ranfurly Shield	1902	2022	Domestic Challenge		New Zealand provinces. For a list of holders, see Ranfurly Shield#Past shield-holders.	Northland	Named after Uchter Knox, 5th Earl of Ranfurly, the Governor of New Zealand who donated the trophy to the New Zealand Rugby Football Union in 1901. The NZRFU decided to award it to the winner of its 1902 season, and then make it subject to a challenge system.
Super Rugby Pacific Trophy	2022	2022	Tournament		Provincial teams from New Zealand, Australia, Pacific Islands and Fiji	Crusaders	A brand new Super Rugby competition created by Sanzaar in late 2021. This will be the first full Super Rugby comp that will not involve teams from South Africa, Argentina and Japan.
Super Rugby Trophy	2011	2019	Tournament		Provincial teams from New Zealand, Australia and South Africa	Crusaders	
Super 12 Trophy	1996	2005	Tournament		Provincial teams from New Zealand, Australia and South Africa	Crusaders	
Super 14 Trophy	2006	2010	Tournament		Provincial teams from New Zealand, Australia and South Africa	Bulls	
Currie Cup	1892	2021	Domestic		South Africa provinces See Currie Cup#Overall winners	Blue Bulls	South Africa's premier domestic rugby union competition, featuring teams representing either entire provinces or substantial regions within provinces. Named after Sir Donald Currie, owner of Union-Castle Lines, who instructed the touring British Isles team of 1891 to hand this trophy over to the team in South Africa that gave them the best game.
MacTier Cup	1998	2018	Domestic		Rugby Canada Super League; Canadian Rugby Championship	Ontario Blues	Prior to 2009, was awarded to the winner of the RCSL. From 2009 onwards, was awarded to the winner of the CRC.
Meads Cup	2006	2019	Domestic		New Zealand second-level provinces. See Heartland Championship#Winners.	North Otago	The top-tier trophy awarded in New Zealand's second-level domestic competition, the Heartland Championship. Named after iconic All Black Colin Meads.
Lochore Cup	2006	2019	Domestic		New Zealand second-level provinces. See Heartland Championship#Winners.	South Canterbury	The second-tier trophy awarded in the Heartland Championship. Named after another All Black great, Brian Lochore.
Hanan Shield	1946	2016	Domestic		New Zealand provinces		Competed for on a challenge system between North Otago, South Canterbury and Mid Canterbury
Rundle Cup	1911	2018	Domestic		New Zealand provinces		Awarded to the winner of the match between West Coast and Buller
Bouclier de Brennus	1892	2021	Domestic		(France) French League; For winners see Top 14#Total wins	Toulouse	Trophy awarded to the winners of the French rugby union domestic league. Named after Charles Brennus, cofounder of France's original rugby governing body, USFSA, who created the shield based on a design by the other cofounder, Pierre de Coubertin. The original trophy is no longer presented. Due to its increasingly battered condition, it was decided in 2003 to restore the trophy and place it on permanent static display. In each season since 2003, with the exception of 2004 when the original was used one final time, a replica of the original shield has been presented.
European Rugby Champions Cup	1996	2022	Tournament		Clubs from England, France, Ireland, Italy, Scotland and Wales. For winners see Heineken Cup records and statistics.	(France) Stade Rochelais	Known as the Heineken Champions Cup for sponsorship reasons
European Rugby Challenge Cup	1996	2022	Tournament		Clubs from England, France, Ireland, Italy, Scotland and Wales which do not qualify for the Champions Cup, along with clubs knocked out in the group stage of the Champions Cup; For winners, see European Challenge Cup finals.	(France) Lyon OU	Formerly known for sponsorship reasons as the Amlin Challenge Cup.
National Rugby Championship Trophy	2014	2019	Domestic		Australia's top-level clubs	Western Force	Australia's premier domestic rugby union competition.
Horan-Little Shield	2015	2019	Domestic Challenge		Australia's top-level clubs	NSW Country Eagles	Challenge trophy named after Tim Horan and Jason Little. It is contested by Australian clubs within the National Rugby Championship.
1872 Cup	2007–08	2020–21	Domestic Challenge		(Scotland) Glasgow Warriors (Scotland) Edinburgh Rugby	Edinburgh	The 1872 Cup is so named to mark the history of the world's oldest representative match. (This was between Glasgow District and Edinburgh District, the amateur provincial sides that became Glasgow Warriors and Edinburgh Rugby on professionalism. This first 'inter-city' – as it later dubbed – match was played at Burnbank Park, Glasgow on 23 November 1872; Edinburgh District won this first match.) The 1872 Cup between the professional sides started in 2007–08 season; with usually either 2 or 3 legs to win the cup.
URC Regional Shields	2022	2022	Domestic		United Rugby Championship clubs	(Ireland) Irish Shield: Leinster (Wales) Welsh Shield: Ospreys South African Shield: Stormers (Scotland) / (Italy) Scottish/Italian Shield: Edinburgh	Four regional shields for each of Wales, Ireland, South Africa and Scotland/Italy.

=== World Rugby Awards ===
- World Rugby Player of the Year
- World Rugby Team of the Year
- World Rugby Coach of the Year
- World Rugby Junior Player of the Year
- World Rugby Sevens Player of the Year
- IRB International Sevens Team of the Year
- IRB Award for Distinguished Service
- IRB Chairman's Award
- IRB Development Award
- IRB Distinguished Service Award
- World Rugby Hall of Fame
- IRB International U21 Player of the Year
- IRB International U19 Player of the Year
- IRB International Women’s Personality of the Year
- World Rugby Women's Player of the Year
- IRB International Young Player of the Year
- IRB Referee Award for Distinguished Service
- IRB Spirit of Rugby Award
- IRPA Special Merit Award
- IRPA Try of the Year
- Vernon Pugh Award for Distinguished Service

==== Halls of Fame ====
- World Rugby Hall of Fame
- International Rugby Hall of Fame
- World Rugby Museum Wall of Fame

== See also ==
- Laurie O'Reilly Cup, trophy competed for by the women's rugby union teams of Australia and New Zealand
- List of international rugby rivalries
