= World Rugby Women's Sevens Rookie of the Year =

- Awarded for: Best Women's Sevens Rookie of the Year
- Date: 2022; 4 years ago
- Presented by: World Rugby
- First award: 2022
- Currently held by: (France) Anaick Konyi (2026)
- Website: HSBC SVNS

The World Rugby Sevens Rookie of the Year is awarded by World Rugby each year. It was first awarded in 2022. The award is based in large part on the player's performance over the course of the World Rugby Sevens Series, along with other Sevens tournaments during the year.

== List of winners ==
Year	Image	Winner	Country	Other nominees	Ref(s)
2022	—N/a	Maddison Levi	Australia	(Fiji) Reapi Ulunisau (Australia) Alysia Lefau-Fakaosilea	
2023		Jorja Miller	New Zealand	(Fiji) Younis Bese (United States) Sammy Sullivan	
2024	—N/a	Carissa Norsten	Canada	(Spain) Juana Stella (Australia) Kaitlin Shave	
2025	—N/a	Nia Toliver	United States	(Australia) Kahli Henwood (Fiji) Vika Nakacia	
2026	—N/a	Anaick Konyi	France	(Canada) Kennedi Stevenson (United States) Tahna Wilfley	

== Other World Rugby Awards ==
- World Rugby Men's 15s Player of the Year
- World Rugby Men's Sevens Player of the Year
- World Rugby Men's Sevens Rookie of the Year
- World Rugby Team of the Year
- World Rugby Coach of the Year
- World Rugby Junior Player of the Year
- World Rugby Women’s 15s Player of the Year
- World Rugby Women's Sevens Player of the Year
- IRB Spirit of Rugby Award
- Vernon Pugh Award for Distinguished Service
- World Rugby Referee Award
- IRB Development Award
- IRB Chairman's Award

== See also ==
- World Rugby Sevens Series § Player awards by season
