= Lionel Beauxis =

France international rugby union player

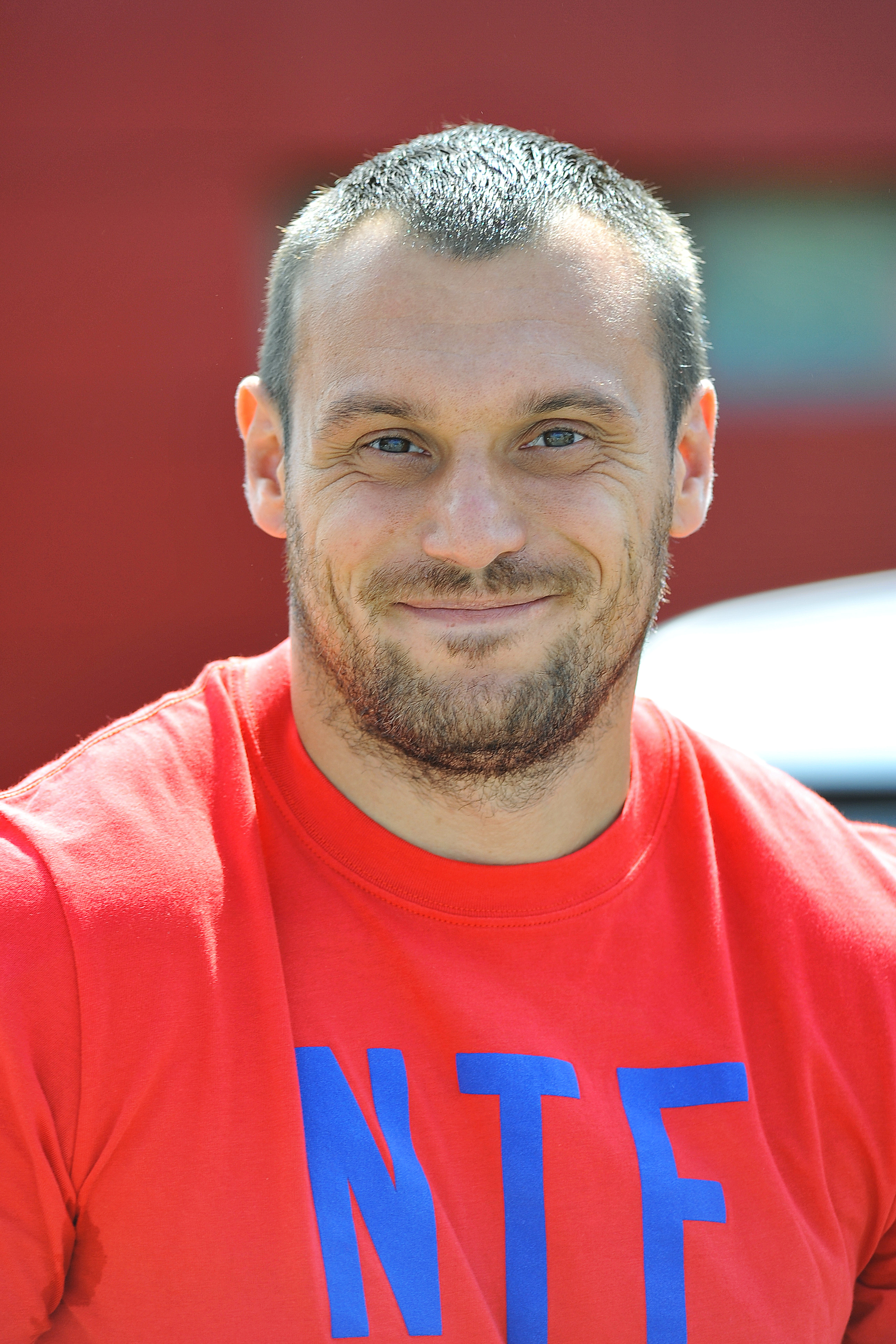
- Born: 24 October 1985 (age 41) Tarbes, France
- Height: 1.80 m (5 ft 11 in)
- Weight: 86 kg (13 st 8 lb)

Rugby union career
- Position: Fly-half
Senior career
Years	Team	Apps	(Points)
2002–2006	Pau	29	(325)
2006–2011	Stade Français	119	(889)
2011–2014	Toulouse	60	(536)
2014–2017	Bordeaux Bègles	54	(295)
2017–2019	Lyon	40	(281)
2019–2021	Oyonnax	19	(168)
2021–2022	Béziers	11	(65)
International career
Years	Team	Apps	(Points)
2007–2018	France	24	(128)

Lionel Beauxis (French pronunciation: [ljɔnɛl boksis]), born on 14 October 1985 in Tarbes (Hautes-Pyrénées), is a former French rugby union player who primarily played as a fly-half.

Beauxis began his career at Section Paloise and went on to play for Stade Français, Stade Toulousain, Union Bordeaux Bègles, Lyon OU, Oyonnax Rugby, and AS Béziers.

In 2006, he won the 2006 Under 21 Rugby World Championship, and he was a member of the France national rugby union team from 2007 to 2012, making a notable return for the 2018 Six Nations Championship. Renowned for his long and precise kicking abilities, Beauxis has made a significant impact in the world of rugby.

== Biography ==
=== Youth and training ===
Lionel Beauxis was born on 24 October 1985 in Tarbes, located in southwestern France. He grew up in Louey, a village nearby, where his father, Patrick, played rugby for Rugby Club Louey Marquisat. His aunt was the club president until 2020. Lionel started playing rugby at this club when he was five years old.

As a child, Lionel's father took him to watch Section Paloise’s European matches in Pau during the late 1990s. This inspired Lionel, and he became a fan of players David Aucagne and Philippe Bernat-Salles.

In 2001, Lionel joined Section Paloise's youth team, achieving his childhood dream. He played alongside future professionals like Fabien Cibray, Arnaud Epito, Grégory Puyo, and Sébastien Tillous-Borde. With the Béarn youth selection, he won the Roger Taddéï Cup, a major youth rugby tournament in France.

He was then selected for the French Under-18 national team. The half-back partnership he formed with Fabien Cibray was seen as particularly promising in French rugby.

=== Debut in Top 14 with Section Paloise ===
Lionel Beauxis and Fabien Cibray were carefully nurtured by Section Paloise's management, who extended their contracts at Stade du Hameau. In 2003, Beauxis joined the professional squad alongside Jean-Baptiste Peyras, who was named as the IRB International U19 Player of the Year.

At the start of the 2003–04 Top 16 season, Beauxis was fully integrated into the team. Since he had not yet reached the age of majority, he couldn't play for the first team until late October 2003, frustrating his coaches.

Beauxis made his first appearance on 22 November 2003 in a friendly against AS Béziers at Stade de la Méditerranée, replacing his idol David Aucagne.

The following week, Beauxis made his official debut in the championship at Stade Amédée-Domenech against CA Brive. Under the guidance of Thierry Ducès, he had a remarkable start, scoring 19 points and matching up well against an experienced Alain Penaud. Beauxis quickly became a key starter at fly-half for Section Paloise, known for his powerful and precise kicking. He was often paired with Philippe Carbonneau at half-back.

Starting in 2004, Section faced financial difficulties. Key players Imanol Harinordoquy and Damien Traille left, and many young players were promoted without proper guidance. Despite these challenges, Beauxis helped lead Section Paloise to the final of the 2004–05 European Challenge Cup.

In 2006, Beauxis was the starting fly-half for the French Under-21 team, which won the 2006 Under 21 Rugby World Championship. Paired with Sébastien Tillous-Borde (replacing the injured Fabien Cibray), Beauxis scored all 24 points in the final against South Africa and was named the tournament's best player by the International Rugby Board.

However, Pau was relegated in the 2005–06 Top 14 season under unclear circumstances during the final match against Castres. Beauxis attempted a missed drop goal when a try could have avoided relegation. Senior players supported him, stating they were unaware of Aviron Bayonnais's score and that Beauxis followed bench instructions.

Beauxis became a scapegoat, particularly criticized by manager Pierre Bouisset, who mentioned a youthful mistake in a press conference.

While Cibray stayed another year in Pro D2, Beauxis left the club with a heavy heart. Section Paloise eventually returned to the top tier of French rugby in the 2015–16 Top 14 season after ten years in Pro D2.

=== Stade Français ===
After winning the World Cup, Lionel Beauxis moved to Stade Français, where he was seen as a key player, vying with Juan Martin Hernandez for the outside half berth. His debut for France came in the 2007 Six Nations, and he was later included in the World Cup squad. He performed well, notably in the quarter-final and semi-final, but struggled with injuries the following season, affecting his club and international appearances.

=== Stade Toulousain ===
He returned to regular play with Stade Toulousain and was recalled to the French team in 2012 but did not make a lasting impact. Beauxis then played for Union Bordeaux Bègles and Lyon Olympique Universitaire, where he was briefly a medical joker. In 2018, he was recalled to the French team after a six-year absence.

He finished his career with AS Béziers Hérault in 2021 and regretted not concluding his career at Section Paloise.

== Notes ==
- "Lionel Beauxis".

Preceded by Tatafu Polota-Nau	IRB International U21 Player of the Year; 2006	Succeeded by Current
