= IRB International U21 Player of the Year =

International U21 Player of the Year
- Presented by: IRB
- First award: 2001
- Final award: 2006

The IRB International U21 Player of the Year was awarded by the International Rugby Board (now World Rugby) in the autumn each year from 2001 to 2006. In 2008, it was combined with the IRB International U19 Player of the Year to create the IRB Junior Player of the Year award.

== List of winners ==
| Year | Winner | Country |
|---|---|---|
| 2001 | Richie McCaw | New Zealand |
| 2002 | Pat Barnard | South Africa |
| 2003 | Ben Atiga | New Zealand |
| 2004 | Jerome Kaino | New Zealand |
| 2005 | Tatafu Polota-Nau | Australia |
| 2006 | Lionel Beauxis | France |

== List of other IRB Awards ==
- World Rugby Player of the Year
- World Rugby Team of the Year
- World Rugby Coach of the Year
- IRB International U19 Player of the Year
- IRB International Sevens Team of the Year
- World Rugby Sevens Player of the Year
- Spirit of Rugby Award
- Vernon Pugh Award for Distinguished Service
- IRB Referee Award for Distinguished Service
- IRB International Women's Personality of the Year
- IRB Development Award
- IRB Chairman's Award
