= Lloyd Walker =

Lloyd Walker may refer to:

- Lloyd Walker (rugby union) (born 1959), Australian rugby union international
- Lloyd Walker, Democratic primary candidate in the 1970 Idaho gubernatorial election
