= IRB International Sevens Team of the Year =

- Presented by: World Rugby
- First award: 2002
- Final award: 2007

The IRB International Sevens Team of the Year was awarded by the International Rugby Board in the November or December each year from 2002 to 2007. In 2002 and 2003, the award was called the IRB Sevens Team of the Year.

== List of winners ==
- 2002: New Zealand
- 2003: New Zealand
- 2004: New Zealand
- 2005: Fiji
- 2006: Fiji
- 2007: New Zealand

== List of other IRB awards ==
- IRB International Player of the Year
- IRB International Team of the Year
- IRB International Coach of the Year
- IRB International U19 Player of the Year
- IRB International U21 Player of the Year
- IRB International Sevens Player of the Year
- Spirit of Rugby Award
- Vernon Pugh Award for Distinguished Service
- IRB Referee Award for Distinguished Service
- IRB International Women's Personality of the Year
- IRB Development Award
- IRB Chairman's Award
