= Matraville Sports High School =

Location
- Anzac Parade; Chifley, New South Wales, 2036; Australia; 33°57′54″S 151°14′41″E

Information
- Former name: Matraville High School
- Type: Government-funded co-educational comprehensive and specialist secondary day school
- Motto: Endeavour
- Established: January 1960; 66 years ago (as Matraville High School); December 2001; 24 years ago (as Matraville Sports High)
- School district: Botany Bay; Metropolitan South
- Educational authority: New South Wales Department of Education
- Specialist: Sports school
- Principal: Nerida Walker
- Years: 7–12
- Enrolment: 479 (2024)
- Campus type: Suburban
- Colours: Navy and sky blue
- Affiliation: NSW Sports High School Association
- Website: matrasport-h.schools.nsw.gov.au

Matraville Sports High School (abbreviated as MSHS) is a government co-educational comprehensive and specialist secondary school, with speciality in sports, located on Anzac Parade, Chifley, in the Eastern Suburbs of Sydney, New South Wales, Australia.

Established in 1960 as Matraville High School, the school became a specialist high school in December 2001 and caters for approximately 479 students from Year 7 to Year 12. The school is operated by the New South Wales Department of Education; the principal is Nerida Walker. Its alumni include Bob Carr and a number of professional sportsmen and women, with its tradition in producing prominent rugby league and rugby union players earning the school the description as a "great rugby nursery". Matraville Sports High School is a member of the NSW Sports High Schools Association.

== History ==
In the years consequent upon the Second World War, the Eastern Suburbs of Sydney saw increasing population growth and, as a result, increasing demands for infrastructure to assist that growth. At the time, the closest high schools in the area were South Sydney Boys' High School and Maroubra Junction Girls' High School. As a result, the local member and Minister for Education, Bob Heffron, made the decision to establish a new high school in Matraville. The site on the corner of Anzac Parade and Franklin Street in southern Matraville was secured by the Department of Education in 1957. The original school site was covered in virgin Banksia scrub growing on low sand hills bordered by houses on Mitchell Street. The southern part of Matraville became the suburb of Chifley in 1964.

At Heffron's instigation, the new school would be co-educational, in a period when the vast majority of NSW secondary schools were sex segregated. Prior to 1960, Robert E. Mobbs, a former Second World War army officer who had also helped establish Fairfield Boys' High and Arthur Phillip High, was appointed as the school's first headmaster. However, a lack of funding restricted the start of construction and it was not until well after the first 200 students had been accepted in 1960 that building began. Therefore, the first students were housed at Daceyville Public School and the 1961 intake of students were sent to Gardeners Road Public School. Designed by the New South Wales Government Architect, in February 1961 the NSW Department of Public Works awarded the contract of £247,740 to build stages I and II of the school to Monier Builders Pty Ltd of Villawood. Construction was finished by early 1962, which allowed the students to finally move in, and was officially opened by the local Member of Parliament for Maroubra and NSW Premier, Bob Heffron, on 27 September 1963.

The school soon generated a reputation for excellence in sports, with a particular emphasis on rugby that was developed by sports master and coach, Geoff Mould. The Waratah Shield, the state knockout competition for Rugby Union, was won by Matraville in 1972, 1976, 1977, 1983 and 2007 and the ARL Schoolboy Cup was also won in 2007. In recognition of the school's excellence in this area, in December 2001, Matraville High was re-established as a specialist sports high, thus becoming "Matraville Sports High School".

== School details ==
In 2024, there were 479 students enrolled in the school from Years 7 through to Year 12. Of these, 179 students were girls and 309 were boys. The school has an enrolment of 28% Aboriginal and Torres Strait Islander students, and 36% of students have a language background other than English. There were approximately 43 teaching staff at the school.

== Notable alumni ==
- Josh Addo-Carr – rugby league player for the Canterbury Bulldogs
- Bayleigh Bentley-Hape – rugby league player for the South Sydney Rabbitohs
- Fred Briggs – rugby league player for Canterbury Bulldogs
- Bob Carr – dux of 1964 and Premier of New South Wales (1995–2005), later Australian Minister for Foreign Affairs.
- Boyd Cordner – rugby league player for the Sydney Roosters and NSW Blues
- Kobie Dee – rapper and musician.
- Tallis Duncan – rugby league player for the South Sydney Rabbitohs
- Sandor Earl – rugby league player for the Sydney Roosters and Penrith Panthers and model
- Mark Ella, and brothers Glen and Gary – rugby union players for the Wallabies.
- Marcia Ella-Duncan – netball player; first Indigenous Australian to play netball for Australia.
- Kane Evans – rugby league player for the Sydney Roosters and Parramatta Eels
- Russell Fairfax – rugby union player; rugby league player for the Sydney Roosters and South Sydney Rabbitohs.
- Addin Fonua-Blake – rugby league player for the Cronulla-Sutherland Sharks
- Sean Garlick – rugby league player for the Sydney Roosters and South Sydney Rabbitohs
- Emre Guler – rugby league player for the St. George Illawarra Dragons
- Mawene Hiroti – rugby league player for the Cronulla-Sutherland Sharks
- Eddie Jones – rugby union player for the NSW Waratahs and Randwick; rugby union coach for the ACT Brumbies, Wallabies, and England
- Martin Kennedy – rugby league player for the Sydney Roosters
- David Knox – rugby union player for the Wallabies
- Maurice Longbottom – rugby union player for the Wallabies
- Davvy Moale – rugby league player for Melbourne Storm
- Willis Meehan – rugby league player for the Sydney Roosters
- Jacob Miller – rugby league player for the Wests Tigers
- Dominique Peyroux – rugby league player for the Gold Coast Titans, New Zealand Warriors and St Helens
- Adem Poric – former football player for Sheffield Wednesday F.C.
- Adam Reynolds – rugby league player for the Brisbane Broncos
- Ky Rodwell – rugby league player for the Wakefield Trinity
- Paul Sait – rugby league player for South Sydney.
- Patrice Siolo – rugby league player for the Cronulla-Sutherland Sharks
- Ken Stewart – rugby league player for South Sydney and Parramatta.
- Daniel Suluka-Fifita – rugby league player for the Canterbury-Bankstown Bulldogs
- James Tamou – rugby league player for the Wests Tigers
- Willie Tonga – rugby league player for the North Queensland Cowboys, Canterbury Bulldogs, and Parramatta Eels
- Dylan Walker – rugby league player for the Manly Warringah Sea Eagles
- Lloyd Walker – rugby union player with the Wallabies.

== See also ==
- List of government schools in New South Wales
- Selective school (New South Wales)
- Education in Australia
