= Isaia Toeava =

New Zealand rugby union player

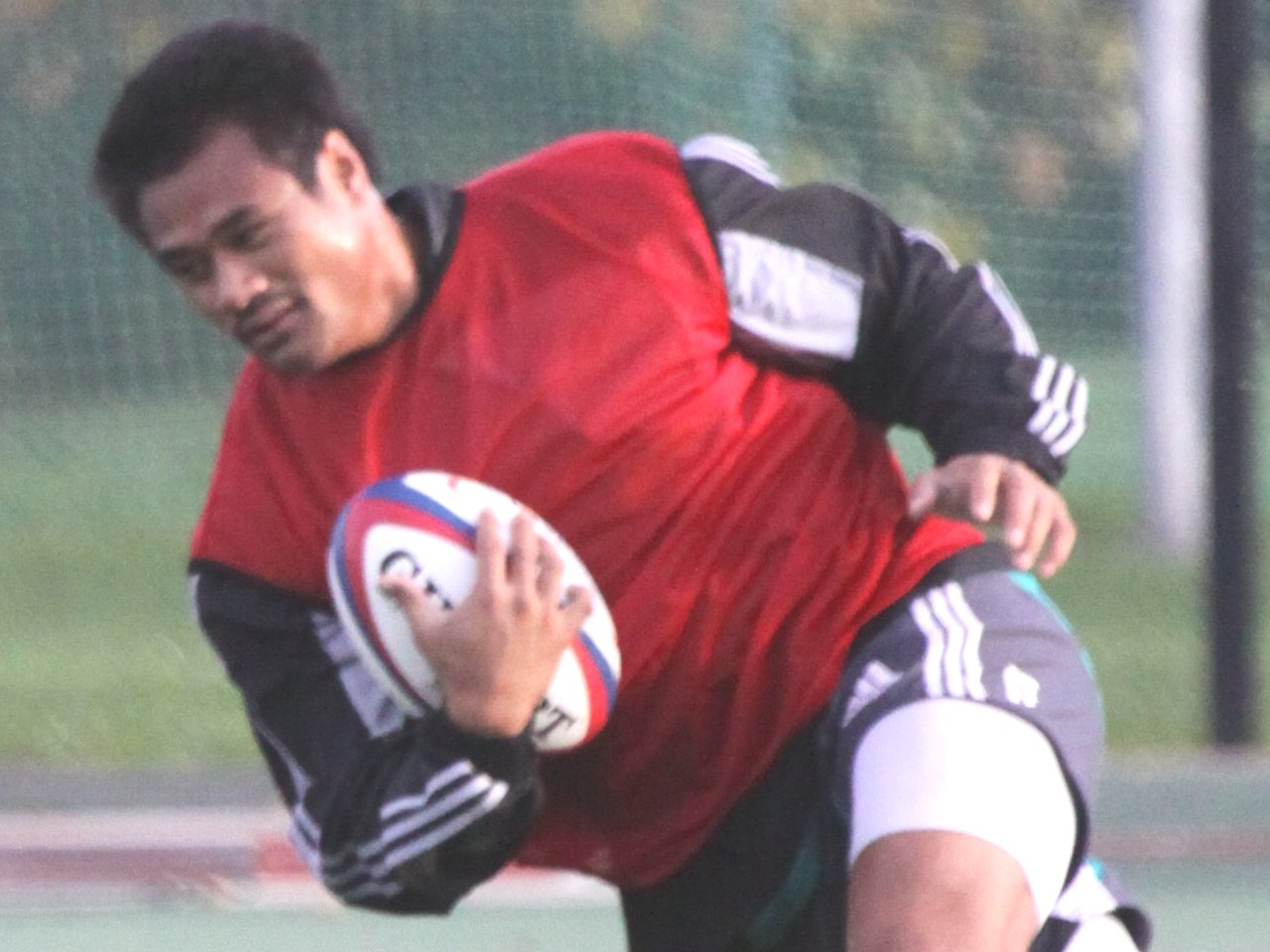
- Toeava during a New Zealand training session, November 2010
- Born: 15 January 1986 (age 40) Moto'otua, Samoa
- Height: 181 cm (5 ft 11 in)
- Weight: 100 kg (220 lb; 15 st 10 lb)
- School: De La Salle College
- Notable relative: Elisapeta Toeava (sister)

Rugby union career
- Position(s): Fullback, Centre, First five-eighth
- Current team: Toulon
Senior career
Years	Team	Apps	(Points)
2005–2011	Auckland	22	(32)
2006	Hurricanes	14	(15)
2007–2012	Blues	61	(91)
2012–2014	Canon Eagles	18	(20)
2014–2016	Kubota Spears	19	(45)
2016–2020	Clermont	65	(55)
2020–2021	Toulon	18	(10)
2021–22	Bayonne	7	(5)
- Correct as of 08 December 2024
International career
Years	Team	Apps	(Points)
2005–2011	New Zealand	37	(40)
2011	Barbarian F.C.	1	(0)
- Correct as of 08 December 2024
National sevens team
Years	Team		Comps
2005	New Zealand		3
- Correct as of 08 December 2024

Isaia "Ice" Toeava (born 15 January 1986) is a former professional rugby union player from New Zealand. He was a part of the 2007 Rugby World Cup and World Cup-winning 2011 Rugby World Cup squads for New Zealand.

== Early career ==
Toeava was born in Samoa but moved to New Zealand in 1994 to live with his grandmother. He attended De La Salle College, Mangere East, he played alongside Taniela Moa in the school's First XV rugby team. He represented New Zealand U-19, where he was named the IRB's Under-19 2005 player of the year. He played at second-five for New Zealand Under 19. Other early career highlights include playing second five for the Championship-winning Auckland Marist Under 21 side, coached by Peter Tubberty. His sister, Peta, is an international netball player having debuted for the Silver Ferns in 2018.

== Career ==
Toeava played for the All Blacks and represented New Zealand in Sevens rugby.

In 2005, Toeava was a shock selection for the All Blacks Grand Slam tour at only 19 years of age. He had had no Super 14 experience, and limited Provincial experience with just eight games for Auckland, and only a solitary start at first-five against Northland.

He played his first-class rugby mainly at centre, wing and fullback. He played his provincial rugby for Auckland in the Air New Zealand Cup and was drafted to the Hurricanes in the 2006 Super 14 season. He played for the Blues for the 2007 season.

He was instrumental in the success of the Blues in the 2007 Super 14 season, scoring four tries and setting up many others from the outside centre position. He was later nominated for Rebel Sport Super 14 Player of the Year at the 2007 Steinlager Rugby Awards.

Toeava played the final two games of the 2011 Tri-Nations tournament. At the 2011 Rugby World Cup, Toeava played in pool matches against Tonga (at left wing), Japan (at fullback), and Canada (coming off the bench in the second half).

In July 2012, Toeava signed a two-year contract with the Tokyo-based Canon Eagles.

In March 2016, Toeava joined Clermont as a medical joker to cover an injury crisis and subsequently established himself at the club. His performances helped guide Clermont to the French Top 14 title and to the top of their pool in the Champions Cup in January 2017. However, an arm injury requiring surgery later ruled him out for the remainder of the season.

On 16 June 2020, Toeava signs for Top 14 rivals Toulon ahead of the 2020–21 season. On 25 November 2021, he signed for another French side Bayonne in the second-tier Pro D2 ahead of the 2021–22 season.

== NZRU Annual Awards ==
- NZRU Age-Grade Player of the Year, 2005

== New Zealand Representative Teams ==
- New Zealand Secondary Schools in 2003
- New Zealand Sevens rugby in 2005
- New Zealand Under 19 in 2005
- All Blacks in 2005–07, 2010

== Career Notes ==
- Played every match in his first Super 14 season for the Hurricanes.
- Scored two tries against Northland in his only start of the season for Auckland in the 2005 Air New Zealand NPC.
- Received the 2005 IRB Under-19 Player of the Year award, announced in November 2005 in Paris.
- Scored 62 points in four matches for New Zealand Under 19 at the IRB Under 19 World Championships in South Africa in 2005, including five tries and 37 points from the boot.

Awards
Preceded by (New Zealand) Jeremy Thrush	IRB International U19 Player of the Year; 2005	Succeeded by (Australia) Josh Holmes
