= Josh Holmes (rugby union) =

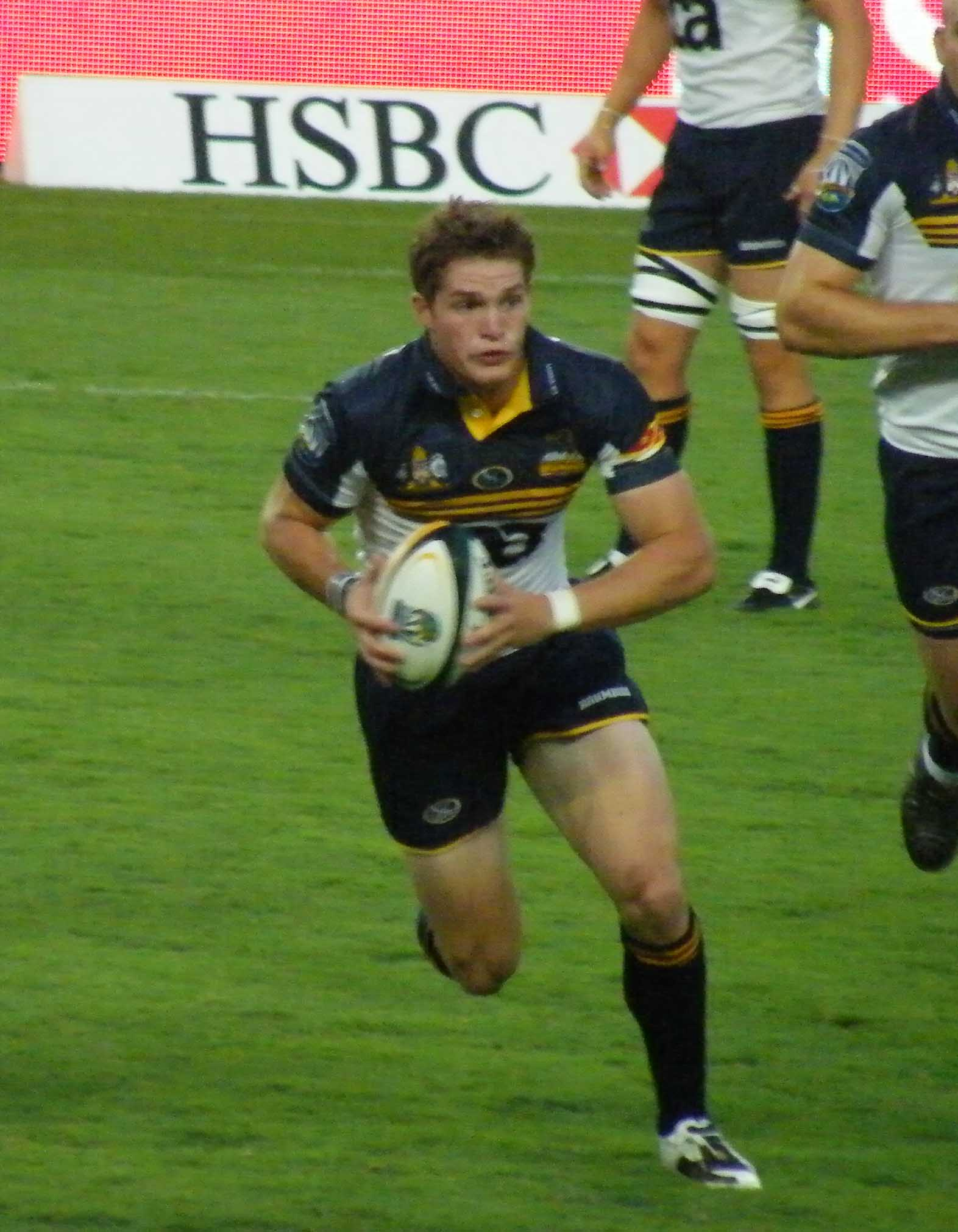
- Born: 6 January 1987 (age 39) Newport, NSW
- Height: 1.87 m (6 ft 2 in)
- Weight: 94 kg (207 lb)

Rugby union career
- Position: Scrum half
Senior career
Years	Team	Apps	(Points)
2007	Western Sydney Rams	8	(10)
2011–12	Bourgoin	19	(20)
2014−	North Harbour Rays	16	(50)
- Correct as of 4 November 2015
Super Rugby
Years	Team	Apps	(Points)
2007	Waratahs	4	(5)
2008–09	Brumbies	26	(15)
2010–11	Waratahs	16	(20)
2012	Force	10	(5)
2014	Rebels	1	(0)
- Correct as of 4 June 2014

Josh Holmes (born 6 January 1987, in Sydney) is an Australian rugby union player. He has played Super Rugby for the Western Force, Brumbies, and New South Wales Waratahs. His preferred position is scrum half.

== Career ==
Holmes made his provincial debut for the Waratahs as an 18-year-old in 2005, but did not play Super 14 until 2007, when he made his debut for the Waratahs against the Brumbies. He racked up 4 caps before moving to the Brumbies in the wake of George Gregan's departure.

Holmes was competing with Patrick Phibbs for the starting position at the Brumbies side, but spent the next two seasons with playing in every game, whether starting or on the bench.

In 2010, he returned to the Waratahs on a two-year deal. He joined the Western Force in April 2012 to cover injured players James Stannard and Justin Turner. In May 2014, he signed a short-term contract with the Melbourne Rebels as injury replacement for Nic Stirzaker.

== Family ==
Holmes' older brother Luke also plays Super Rugby. He is married to Sarah Holmes.

Awards
Preceded by (New Zealand) Isaia Toeava	IRB International U19 Player of the Year; 2006	Succeeded by (New Zealand) Robbie Fruean
