= Rugby League World Cup records =

Rugby League World Cup records have been accumulating since the first Rugby League World Cup tournament was held in 1954.

== Team records ==
=== All-time record ===
This all-time table compares national teams that have participated in the Rugby League World Cup by a number of criteria including matches, wins, losses, draws, total points for, total points against, etc.

This table also shows accumulated points, which treats each match as a group stage match (2 points for a win, 1 point for a draw, 0 points for a loss) and accumulates them together.

As of 2026 World Cup

Team	Part	Pld	W	D	L	PF	PA	PD	Pts	Ref
Australia	17	88	76	1	11	2,968	842	+2,126	153	
Cook Islands	4	7	2	1	9	180	546	-366	5	
England	8	41	26	2	13	1,239	602	+637	54	
Fiji	7	27	13	0	14	620	796	-176	26	
France	17	66	16	3	47	699	1,766	-1,067	35	
Great Britain	9	41	25	3	13	897	487	+410	53	
Greece	1	3	0	0	3	20	200	-200	0	
Ireland	5	16	7	0	10	324	370	-46	14	
Italy	3	9	3	1	5	168	266	-98	7	
Jamaica	1	3	0	0	3	20	190	-170	0	
Lebanon	4	14	4	1	9	269	421	-152	9	
New Zealand	17	79	40	3	36	2,061	1,410	+651	83	
Aotearoa Māori (Note: Aotearoa Māori were not a national team, but a representative side made up of players with Māori heritage.)	1	3	1	0	2	49	67	-18	2	
Papua New Guinea	9	38	10	1	27	631	1,222	-591	21	
Russia	1	3	0	0	3	20	224	-204	0	
Samoa	7	27	13	1	13	708	632	+76	27	
Scotland	5	16	3	2	11	194	537	-343	8	
South Africa	2	6	0	0	6	36	322	-286	0	
Tonga	7	24	15	1	8	706	415	+291	31	
United States	2	7	2	0	5	76	288	-212	4	
Wales	6	25	8	0	17	386	637	-251	16	

=== Top four finishes ===
Top four finishes
Team	Champions	Runners-up	Third / fourth / losing semi-finalists
Australia	13 (1957, 1968, 1970, 1975, 1977, 1988, 1992, 1995, 2000, 2013, 2017, 2021, 2026)	3 (1960, 1972, 2008)	1 (1954)
Great Britain	3 (1954, 1960, 1972)	4 (1964, 1970, 1977, 1992)	2 (1968, 1988)
New Zealand	1 (2008)	4 (1985–88, 2000, 2013, 2026)	11 (1954, 1957, 1960, 1968, 1970, 1972, 1975, 1977, 1992, 1995, 2021)
England		3 (1975, 1995, 2017)	4 (2000, 2008, 2013, 2021)
France		2 (1954, 1968)	6 (1957, 1960, 1970, 1972, 1977, 1992)
Samoa		1 (2021)	1 (2026)
Wales			3 (1975, 1995, 2000)
Fiji			3 (2008, 2013, 2017)
Tonga			2 (2017, 2026)
Papua New Guinea			1 (1988)

- Tournaments 1954–1992 did not feature semi-final and quarter-final rounds.

=== Title win rate ===
Team	Win rate
Australia	76.47%
Great Britain	33.33%
New Zealand	5.59%

=== Biggest wins ===
Biggest margin of victory
Rank	Winner	Score	Loser	Points	Year
1	Australia	110–4	Russia	106	2000
2	England	94–4	Greece	90	2021
3	Australia	84–0	Scotland	84	2021
4	Tonga	92–10	Cook Islands	82	2021
5	England	82–0	France	82	2026

== Individual records ==
=== Most appearances ===
All-time top player appearances
Rank	Player	Country(s)	Years	Apps
1	Cameron Smith	Australia	2008–2017	17
2	Chris Hill	England	2013–2022	16
2	Apisai Koroisau	Fiji	2013–2026	16
4	Bob Fulton	Australia	1968–1975	15

=== Top try scorers ===
All-time top try scorers
Rank	Player	Country(s)	Years	Tries
1	Billy Slater	Australia	2008–2017	16
2	Jarryd Hayne	Australia; Fiji	2008–2017	14
2	Ryan Hall	England	2013–2022	14
2	Dominic Young	England	2022–2026	14
2	Valentine Holmes	Australia	2017–2022	14
5	Bob Fulton	Australia	1968–1975	13

=== Top points scorers ===
All-time top point scorers
Rank	Player	Country(s)	Years	Points
1	Johnathan Thurston	Australia	2008–2013	124
2	Jamayne Isaako	New Zealand	2018–2026	229
3	Mick Cronin	Australia	1975–1977	108
3	Michael O'Connor	Australia	1986–1990	108
5	George Fairbairn	Great Britain; England	1975–1977	92

=== Most tries in a single tournament ===
- Valentine Holmes – 12 (Australia, 2017)
- Josh Addo-Carr – 12 (Australia, 2022)

=== Most tries in a match ===
- Valentine Holmes – 6 (for Australia vs. Fiji, 24 November 2017)

=== Most points in a single tournament ===
- Michael O'Connor – 100 (Australia, 1985–1988)

=== Most points in a match ===
- Ryan Girdler – 46 (for Australia vs. Russia, 4 November 2000)

== Miscellaneous ==
=== Winning captains and coaches ===
A foreign coach has never managed a World Cup-winning team.

Year	Captain	Coach	Team
1954	(Scotland) Dave Valentine	(England) G Shaw	Great Britain
1957	Dick Poole	Dick Poole	Australia
1960	(England) Eric Ashton	(England) William Fallowfield	Great Britain
1968	Johnny Raper	Harry Bath	Australia
1970	Ron Coote	Harry Bath	Australia
1972	(Wales) Clive Sullivan	(England) Jim Challinor	Great Britain
1975	Arthur Beetson	Graeme Langlands	Australia
1977	Arthur Beetson	Terry Fearnley	Australia
1988	Wally Lewis	Don Furner	Australia
1992	Mal Meninga	Bob Fulton	Australia
1995	Brad Fittler	Bob Fulton	Australia
2000	Brad Fittler	Chris Anderson	Australia
2008	Nathan Cayless	Stephen Kearney	New Zealand
2013	Cameron Smith	Tim Sheens	Australia
2017	Cameron Smith	Mal Meninga	Australia
2021	James Tedesco	Mal Meninga	Australia
2026	Isaah Yeo	Kevin Walters	Australia

== Attendance records ==
The 2013 Rugby League World Cup final at the Old Trafford stadium in Manchester, England, drew a world record international rugby league attendance of 74,468.

=== Top 5 match attendances ===
Year	Venue	City/country	Event	Result	Attendance
2013	Old Trafford	Manchester, England	Final	Australia def. New Zealand 34–2	74,468
1989–92	Wembley Stadium (1923)	London, England	Final	Australia def. Great Britain 10–6	73,631
2013	Wembley Stadium	London, England	Semi final (double header)	Australia def. Fiji 64–0; New Zealand def. England 20–18	67,575
1995	Wembley Stadium (1923)	London, England	Final	Australia def. England 16–8	66,540
1968	Sydney Cricket Ground	Sydney, Australia	Group stage	Australia def. Great Britain 25–10	62,256

=== Top 5 World Cup final attendances ===
Year	Venue	City/country	Result	Attendance
2013	Old Trafford	Manchester, England	Australia def. New Zealand 34–2	74,468
1992	Wembley Stadium (1923)	London, England	Australia def. Great Britain 10–6	73,631
1995	Wembley Stadium (1923)	London, England	Australia def. England 16–8	66,540
1968	Sydney Cricket Ground	Sydney, Australia	Australia def. France 20–2	54,290
2026	Suncorp Stadium	Brisbane, Australia	Australia def. New Zealand 32–12	52,461

=== Highest attendance per host nation ===
Country	Year	Venue	City	Event	Result	Attendance
England	2013	Old Trafford	Manchester	Final	Australia def. New Zealand 34–2	74,468
Australia	1968	Sydney Cricket Ground	Sydney	Group stage	Australia def. Great Britain 25–10	62,256
New Zealand	1988	Eden Park	Auckland	Final	Australia def. New Zealand 25–12	47,363
Wales	2013	Millennium Stadium	Cardiff	Group stage (double header)	Italy def. Wales 32–16; Australia def. England 28–20	45,052
France	1954	Stadium de Toulouse	Toulouse	Group stage	France drew with Great Britain 13–13	37,471
Papua New Guinea	1986	Lloyd Robson Oval	Port Moresby	Group stage	Australia def. Papua New Guinea 62–12	17,000
Ireland	2013	Thomond Park	Limerick	Group stage	Australia def. Ireland 50–0	5,021
Northern Ireland	2000	Windsor Park	Belfast	Group stage	Ireland def. Samoa 30–16	3,207
Scotland	2000	Firhill Stadium	Glasgow	Group stage	Aotearoa Māori def. Scotland 17–16	2,008
