= Glen Ella =

Australian former rugby union player

- Born: Glen Joseph Ella; 5 June 1959 (age 67) La Perouse, New South Wales, Australia
- School: Matraville High School
- Notable relatives: Mark Ella (brother); Gary Ella (brother)

Rugby union career
- Position: Fullback
Amateur team(s)
Years	Team	Apps	(Points)
1978–1988	Randwick		
1989–Unknown	Manly		
Provincial / State sides
Years	Team	Apps	(Points)
- New South Wales
International career
Years	Team	Apps	(Points)
1982–1985	Australia	4	(0)

Glen Joseph Ella (born 5 June 1959) is a former Australian rugby union player and coach. Ella played as a Fullback for Randwick, Manly and New South Wales. Ella also represented Australia in the 1980s, however, did not play at the first Rugby World Cup in the 1987 Rugby World Cup.

== Biography ==
Born in La Perouse, New South Wales, Ella was one of 12 children. Two of his brothers, Mark (his twin) and Gary, and one of his sisters, Marcia, represented Australia in sports – his brothers in rugby union and his sister in netball. He attended school at Matraville High School.

== Playing career ==
Ella took up playing at Matraville High School, soon representing New South Wales in schoolboy rugby.

He made his test debut for Australia in a 7–12 loss against Scotland at Ballymore Stadium in 1982, starting at fullback. He played his second test for the Wallabies against Italy in 1983 in Rovigo, winning 7–29. Ella played his last two games for Australia in 1985 against Canada and Fiji respectively. Both matches Australia won convincingly.

== Coaching career ==
Glen Ella was Wallabies assistant coach during the 1995 Rugby World Cup in South Africa. Ella moved with his family to England and he coached Stourbridge for six months. He was a technical adviser to the Brumbies and also coached the Australian Sevens.

According to ESPN, "He also served as Wallabies assistant coach under Eddie Jones and took on a similar role with Canada ahead of their 2007 Rugby World Cup campaign. In 2009 he was appointed to a four-man Fiji Rugby Union selection panel."

In 2016, the England team that toured Australia under coach Eddie Jones engaged Ella's coaching services to develop England’s attacking play, and backs skills.
