= Josh Addo-Carr =

Australian rugby league footballer (born 1995)

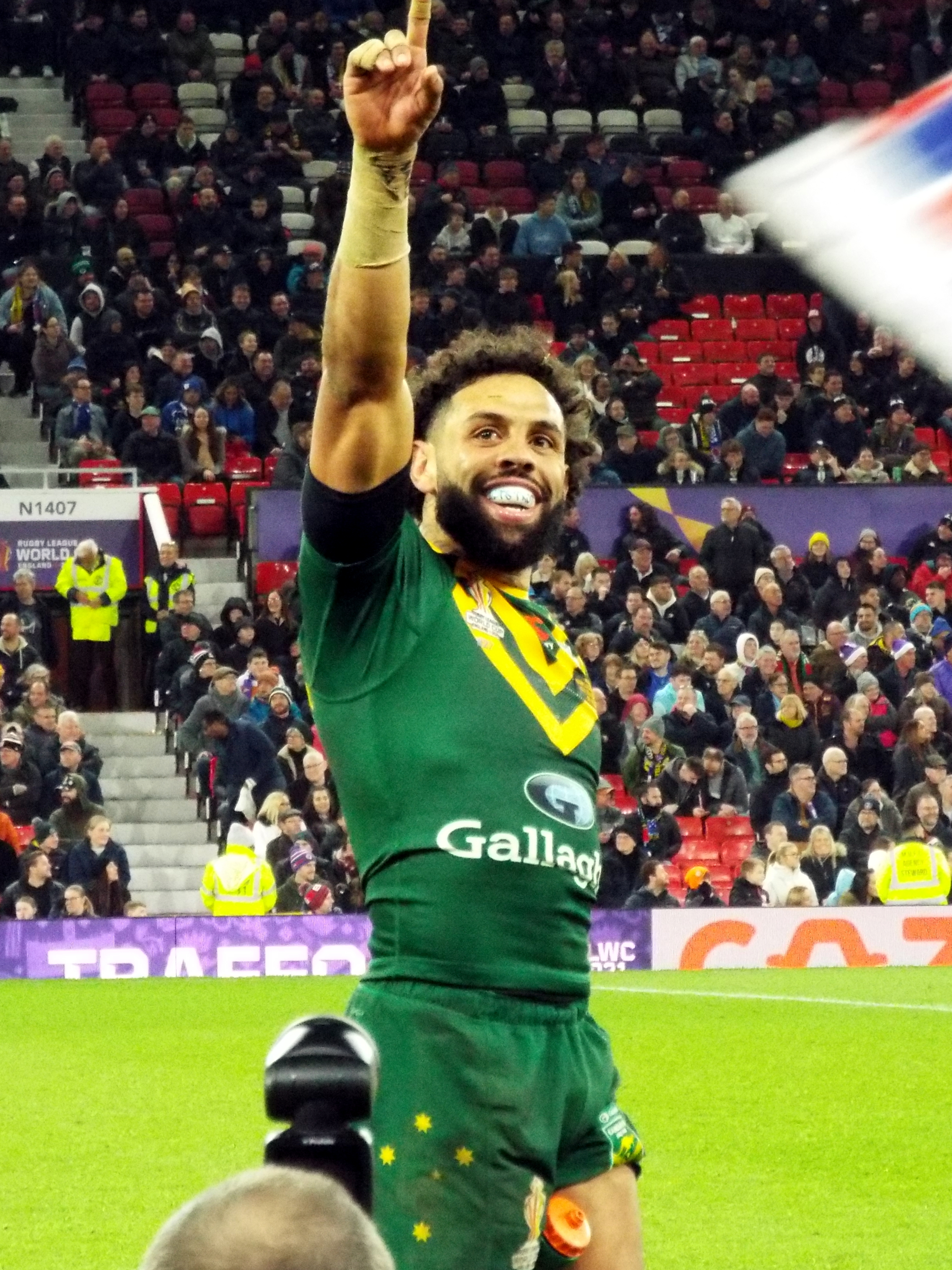

Personal information
- Full name: Joshua Addo-Carr
- Born: 28 July 1995 (age 31) Blacktown, New South Wales, Australia
- Height: 183 cm (6 ft 0 in)
- Weight: 90 kg (14 st 2 lb)

Playing information
- Position: Wing
Club
Years	Team	Pld	T	G	FG	P
2016	Wests Tigers	9	6	0	0	24
2017–21	Melbourne Storm	118	96	1	0	386
2022–24	Canterbury Bulldogs	52	38	0	0	152
2025–	Parramatta Eels	45	27	0	0	108
	Total	224	167	1	0	670
Representative
Years	Team	Pld	T	G	FG	P
2017	NSW City	1	0	0	0	0
2018–23	New South Wales	15	11	0	0	44
2019–25	Australia	10	14	0	0	56
2019	Australia 9's	4	4	0	0	16
2019–26	Indigenous All Stars	5	5	0	0	20
2022	Prime Minister's XIII	1	1	0	0	4
- Source: As of 6 September 2026
- Education: Matraville Sports High School
- Relatives: Tyrone Munro (cousin); Wally Carr (grandfather)

Joshua Addo-Carr (born 28 July 1995), nicknamed "The Fox", is an Australian professional rugby league footballer who plays as a winger for the Parramatta Eels in the National Rugby League and Australia at international level. Addo-Carr is a dual premiership winner 2017 and 2020 with the Melbourne Storm and 2021 World Cup winner.

He began his career with the Wests Tigers in the NRL. Addo-Carr won the 2017 and the 2020 NRL Premiership with the Storm. At representative level he has played for the Indigenous All Stars, NSW City and helped New South Wales win the 2018 State of Origin in his Origin debut series. He is known as one of the fastest players in the NRL.

== Early life ==
Addo-Carr was born in Blacktown, New South Wales, Australia, and is of Aboriginal descent from Gunggandji, Birrbay and Wiradjuri people.

Addo-Carr first picked up a football playing for the Doonside Roos as a three-year-old, before his family moved to Earlwood, New South Wales, where he began playing rugby league for the Earlwood Saints.

Addo-Carr attended Matraville Sports High School and played his junior rugby league for the La Perouse Panthers and Moore Park. In 2012, Addo-Carr played with the South Sydney Rabbitohs SG Ball team before being released due to an off-field incident. He was then signed by the Cronulla Sharks.

Addo-Carr is the grandson of Australian former boxer, Wally Carr.

== Playing career ==
=== Early career ===
In 2014 and 2015, Addo-Carr played for the Cronulla Sharks' National Youth Competition team where he scored 28 tries in 44 matches. On 23 September 2015, he signed a one-year contract with the Wests Tigers starting in 2016.

=== 2016: Wests Tigers ===
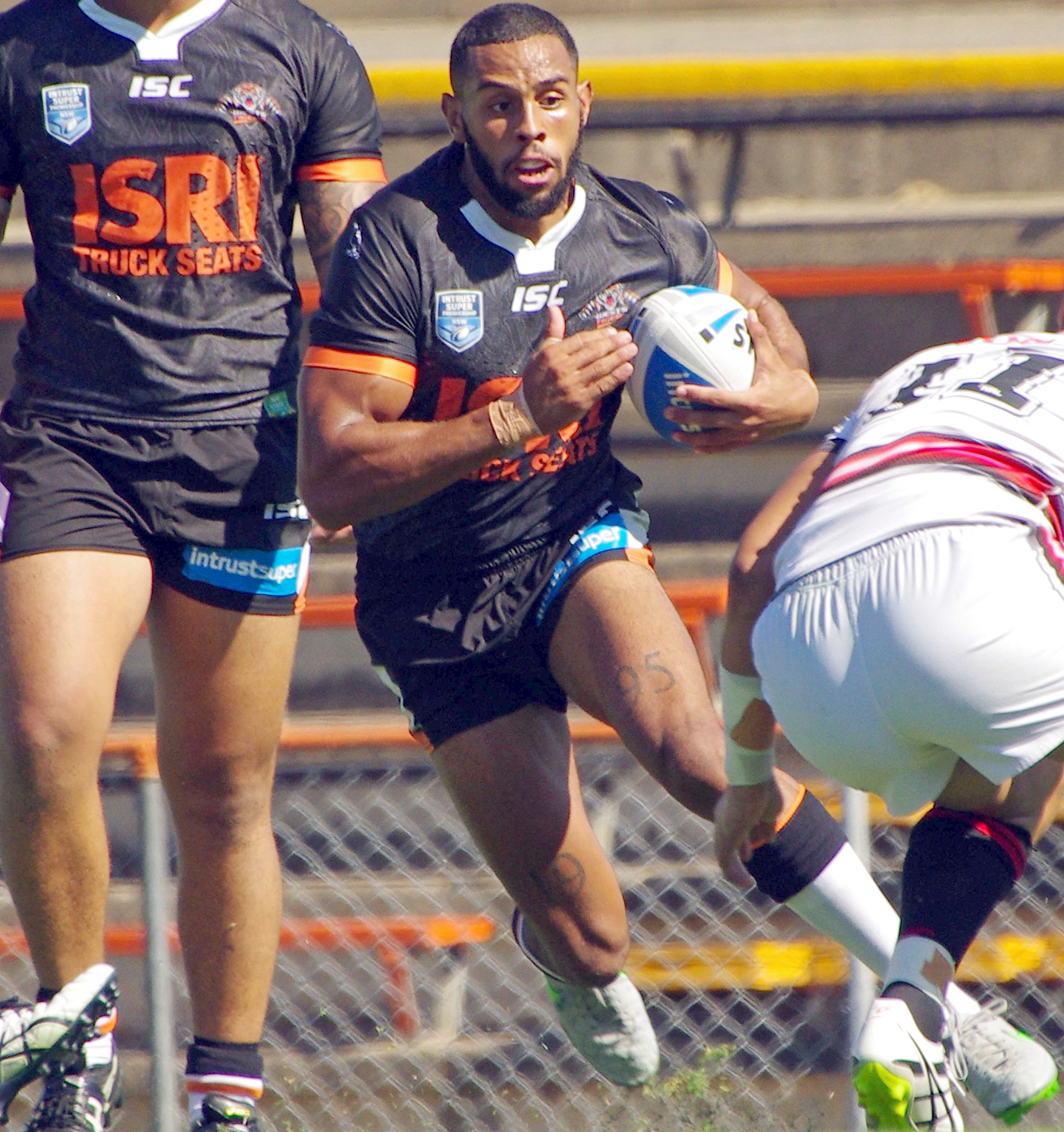
Addo-Carr playing in the Wests Tigers NSW Cup team in 2016

In Round 7, Addo-Carr made his NRL debut for the Wests Tigers against the Melbourne Storm, scoring a try. Coincidentally, Suliasi Vunivalu made his debut on that same day opposite Addo-Carr for the Storm, also scoring a try on debut, Vunivalu would go on to be Addo-Carr's wing partner during his tenure at the Melbourne-based club.

On 6 June, he signed a three-year contract with the Melbourne Storm starting in 2017.

In September, he was named on the wing in the 2016 Intrust Super Premiership NSW Team of the Year.

=== 2017–2021: Melbourne Storm ===
Addo-Carr made his Melbourne Storm debut in round 1 of the season against the Canterbury-Bankstown Bulldogs at Belmore Sports Ground. In Round 3 against the Brisbane Broncos, Addo-Carr scored his first club try for Melbourne in the final minutes to win the match 14–12 at AAMI Park. On 7 May, he represented City Origin against Country Origin, playing on the wing in the 20–10 win at Mudgee. In round 25 against the South Sydney Rabbitohs, Addo-Carr scored his first career hat-trick of tries in the 64–6 win at AAMI Park. On 31 August 2017, Addo-Carr extended his contract with Melbourne to the end of the 2021 season. He went on to play in 2017 NRL Grand Final and scored two tries to help seal the premiership for the Storm.

In 2018, Addo-Carr was selected to play for New South Wales in the 2018 State of Origin series. He played in all three games as New South Wales won their first origin shield since 2014. In the 2018 NRL Grand Final, Carr scored an 85-metre intercept try in the 21–6 loss to the Sydney Roosters, bringing his year tally to 18 tries from 25 games.

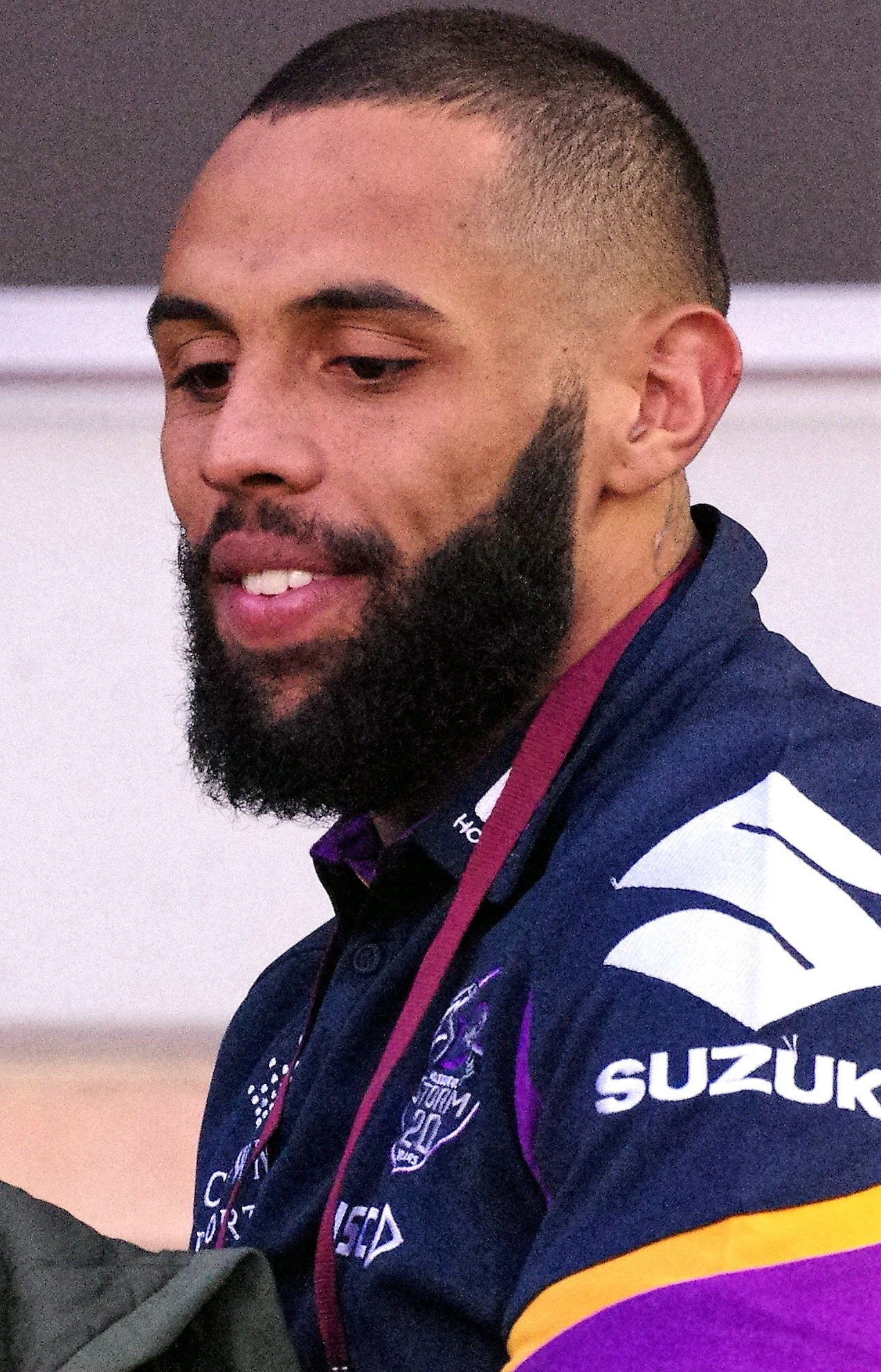
Addo-Carr with Melbourne in 2019

Before the start of the 2019 State of Origin series, Addo-Carr was one of the New South Wales players who declared they would not sing the Australian National Anthem. He played in all 3 games as New South Wales won 2–1 and retained the shield for the first time since 2005. At club level, Addo-Carr made 23 appearances and scored 16 tries as Melbourne finished as minor premiers. Melbourne would go on to reach the preliminary final against the Sydney Roosters but were defeated 14–6.

On 7 October 2019, Addo-Carr Made his international debut for Australia Kangaroos in squads for both the 2019 Rugby League World Cup 9s and Oceania Cup fixtures.

On 27 April, Addo-Carr was fined $1000 by the NRL and placed under investigation after he broke strict lockdown protocols with fellow player Latrell Mitchell by going on a weekend camping trip during the Coronavirus pandemic. He was also placed in further scrutiny for use of a firearm after he posed with and fired a gun in a video posted on his Instagram page. The next day, he was fined an additional $50,000 by the NRL for breaching strict self isolation protocols and for bringing the game into disrepute.

At club level, he went on to win the 2020 NRL Grand Final at Melbourne, finishing his season with 16 tries in 21 appearances. He was later on selected on the wing to represent New South Wales in the 2020 State of Origin series, scoring two tries in their 14–18 loss in game 1, and two tries in the 34–10 victory in game 2. NSW would end up losing the series 2–1 after defeat to Queensland in Game 3. On 16 December 2020, he signed a four-year deal to join Canterbury-Bankstown from 2022 onwards.

In round 9 of the 2021 NRL season, Addo-Carr scored six tries in Melbourne's 50–0 win over the South Sydney Rabbitohs. In scoring six tries in a single game, Addo-Carr set a new Melbourne Storm club record and became the first player in Australia in 71 years to do so; the last was Jack Troy in 1950 while playing for Newtown.

On 30 May, he was selected for game one of the 2021 State of Origin series. In game two of the series, he scored two tries as New South Wales defeated Queensland 26-0. Addo-Carr played a total of 22 games for Melbourne in the 2021 NRL season and scored 23 tries as the club won 19 matches in a row and claimed the Minor Premiership. He played in the preliminary final where Melbourne suffered a shock 10-6 loss against eventual premiers Penrith.

=== 2022–2024: Canterbury-Bankstown Bulldogs ===
In round 1 of the 2022 NRL season, Addo-Carr made his club debut for Canterbury in their 6–4 victory against North Queensland at the Queensland Country Bank Stadium.

In round 6, Addo-Carr scored his first try for Canterbury in their 36–16 loss against South Sydney. In round 8, Addo-Carr captained the Canterbury side and scored two tries in their upset 16–12 victory over the Sydney Roosters.

On 29 May 2022, Addo-Carr was not selected by New South Wales coach Brad Fittler for game one of the 2022 State of Origin series.

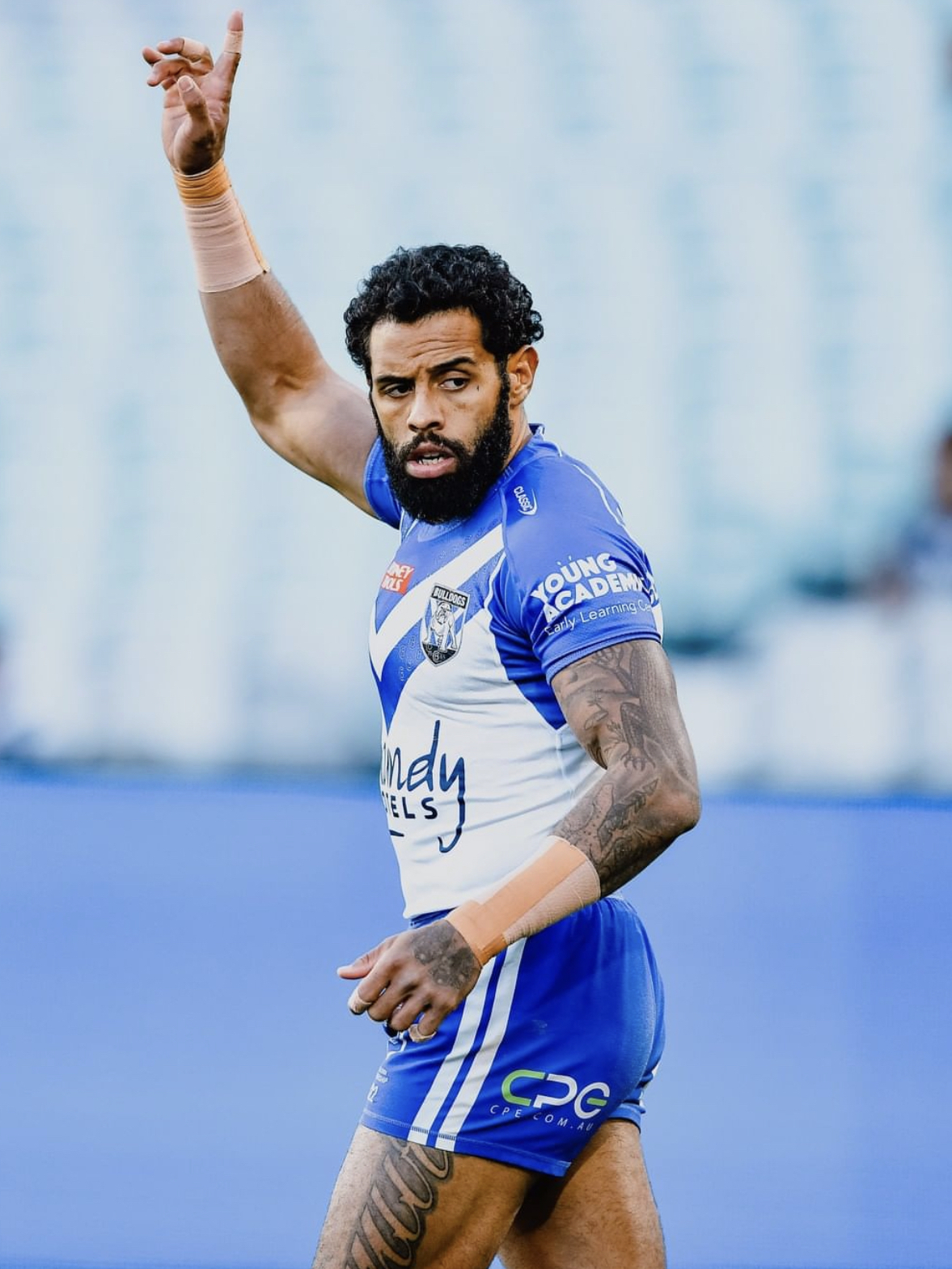
Addo-Carr playing for the Canterbury Bulldogs in 2022

In round 13, Addo-Carr scored two tries for Canterbury in a 30–18 loss against a depleted Penrith side.

In round 14, Addo-Carr scored a hat-trick in Canterbury's 34–4 victory over arch-rivals Parramatta. On 19 June, Addo-Carr was not selected for game two of the State of Origin series despite his good form at club level with coach Brad Fittler opting to retain the out of form Daniel Tupou. In round 19, Addo-Carr scored a hat-trick in Canterbury's 36–26 victory over the hapless Gold Coast.

Addo-Carr was selected in the 24-man squad for the Australian Kangaroos by Mal Meninga to travel to England to compete in the 2021 Rugby League World Cup. He proved the critics wrong, as journalist Paul Crawley said in response to Brad Fittler's controversial decision to not select him for the 2022 State of Origin series: "so from a Canterbury recruitment perspective and Gus is talking about having all this money that is available in 2024, what rep player or future rep player with half a clue would want to go to the Bulldogs knowing it could be the end of your representative career if you go there?" He was accompanied by Canterbury-Bankstown Bulldogs five-eighth Matt Burton, both representing the Belmore-based club.

Addo-Carr played on the wing against Fiji Bati at Headingley Stadium in Leeds scoring a double as the Kangaroos won 42-8. Addo-Carr's first try was a spectacular 98 metre run beating Fiji fullback Sunia Turuva. For the second, Addo-Carr in a roaming role picked up a grubber kick from Harry Grant to score next to the posts. After the game, the media posed serious questions to Fittler for making the call not to pick Addo-Carr for the Blues in 2022, in a series they would ultimately lose.

After scoring four tries against Scotland including a "world class" try in the final minute, the "Foxx" was labelled a star, unstoppable and a "freaky man". In the quarter-final of the 2021 Rugby League World Cup, Addo-Carr scored five tries for Australia in a 48–4 victory over Lebanon. In the semi-final of the 2021 Rugby League World cup, Addo-Carr scored one try against the New Zealand Kiwis in a 16-14 win. The try was a cross-field kick by hooker Ben Hunt that was picked up by Addo-Carr and put down on the left side of the field, which equalled the World Cup record of most tries scored in one tournament, set by Valentine Holmes in the 2017 Rugby League World Cup.

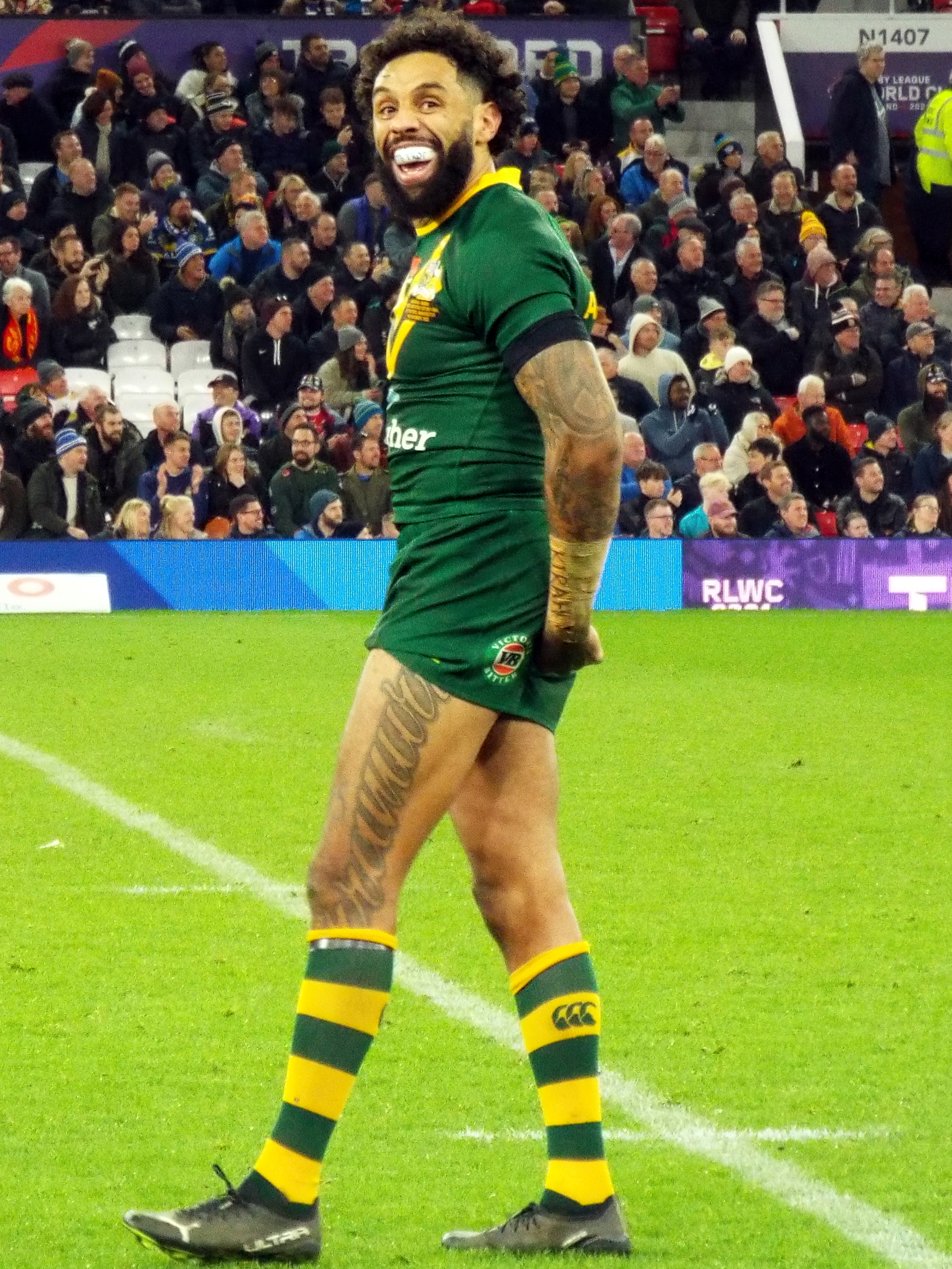
Addo-Carr during the closing stages of the 2021 RLWC Final in 2022

Addo-Carr played for Australia in their 2021 Rugby League World Cup final victory over Samoa. In November he was named in the 2021 RLWC Team of the Tournament.

In round 3 of the 2023 NRL season, Addo-Carr scored two tries in Canterbury's 26-22 victory over the Wests Tigers at Belmore Sports Ground. In round 6 of the 2023 NRL season, Addo-Carr was taken from the field during Canterbury's 50-16 loss against South Sydney with a leg injury. The following day it was confirmed that Addo-Carr would require surgery and was ruled out for eight weeks, adding to an already extensive injury list for Canterbury. After dropping out the week before, Addo-Carr made his return in round 12, in Canterbury's 20-18 victory over the Gold Coast Titans, scoring a try in Indigenous Round. In Round 14, Addo-Carr scored a double in Canterbury's 25-24 loss to the Sydney Roosters. On 22 May 2023, Addo-Carr was selected by New South Wales for game one of the 2023 State of Origin series. In game 2 of the series, Addo-Carr was sent to the sin bin just before full-time for punching Queensland player Reece Walsh. New South Wales would lose the game 32-6. In round 27 of the 2023 NRL season, Addo-Carr scored a hat-trick in Canterbury's 34-30 loss against the Gold Coast.

In round 1 of the 2024 NRL season, Addo-Carr suffered a serious shoulder injury in Canterbury's 28-6 loss against Parramatta. In round 6, Addo-Carr scored a hat-trick in Canterbury's narrow 16-14 loss against his former club Melbourne. Addo-Carr was overlooked by New South Wales selectors ahead of the 2024 State of Origin series. In round 13, Addo-Carr scored two tries but was later taken during the field in Canterbury's 32-2 victory over Newcastle. It was revealed after the match that Addo-Carr had torn his hamstring and was ruled out for a minimum of eight weeks. On 18 November, Addo-Carr signed a two-year deal to join the Parramatta Eels.

==== Drug driving and sacking ====
On 10 September 2024, it was reported that Addo-Carr had been pulled over by police as part of a random alcohol and drug test a week earlier. It was alleged that he had failed the roadside drug test and informed Canterbury the following day. Addo-Carr was tested a second time, with that sample sent away for further analysis. The following day, he stood himself down from playing in the club's elimination final against Manly.

On 13 September, police advised that the second sample was positive. Addo-Carr did not contest a $682 fine and a three-month suspension from driving (without having a conviction recorded) after testing positive to cocaine, but claimed that he did not knowingly take any drugs. On 25 October, it was reported that Canterbury had issued Addo-Carr with a show cause notice. On 31 October, Addo-Carr was sacked by Canterbury due to breaches of his playing contract and lack of transparency when he faced the board. After being sacked by Canterbury, Addo-Carr began working a labouring job.

=== 2025: Parramatta ===
Following his sacking by Canterbury, Addo-Carr signed a two-year deal with arch-rivals Parramatta. In round 3 of the 2025 NRL season, Addo-Carr made his club debut for Parramatta and scored a try in their 16-8 loss against his former club Canterbury. In round 7 of the 2025 NRL season, he scored two tries during Parramatta's 38-22 victory over the Wests Tigers. In round 9, Addo-Carr scored two tries for Parramatta in their 28-18 loss against Cronulla at Magic Round. In round 21, Addo-Carr scored his 150th first grade try in Parramatta's shock 22-20 victory over Brisbane. In round 27, Addo-Carr scored a hat-trick in Parramatta's 66-10 victory over wooden spooners Newcastle. Addo-Carr finished the season as the club's top try scorer with 19 tries as the club finished 11th on the table. In February 2026, Addo-Carr was ruled out for at least a month with a broken thumb. Addo-Carr played 23 matches for Parramatta in the 2026 NRL season as the club finished 13th on the table. In September 2026, Addo-Carr was allegedly pulled over police and tested positive for Cocaine. The Parramatta club later released a statement which read "The Parramatta Eels are aware of an alleged incident involving Josh Addo-Carr, The club has notified the NRL Integrity Unit and is co-operating with the appropriate processes, as well as providing welfare support to Josh and his family Parramatta Eels will not be commenting further until the matter has been finalised". In November 2026, the prosecution dropped their case against Addo-Carr after a second laboratory test returned a negative result. Prior to the withdrawal, Addo-Carr was tipped to receive a mandatory 12 game suspension and contract termination. Addo-Carr is expected to front the Parramatta Eels board that will determine his future NRL career.

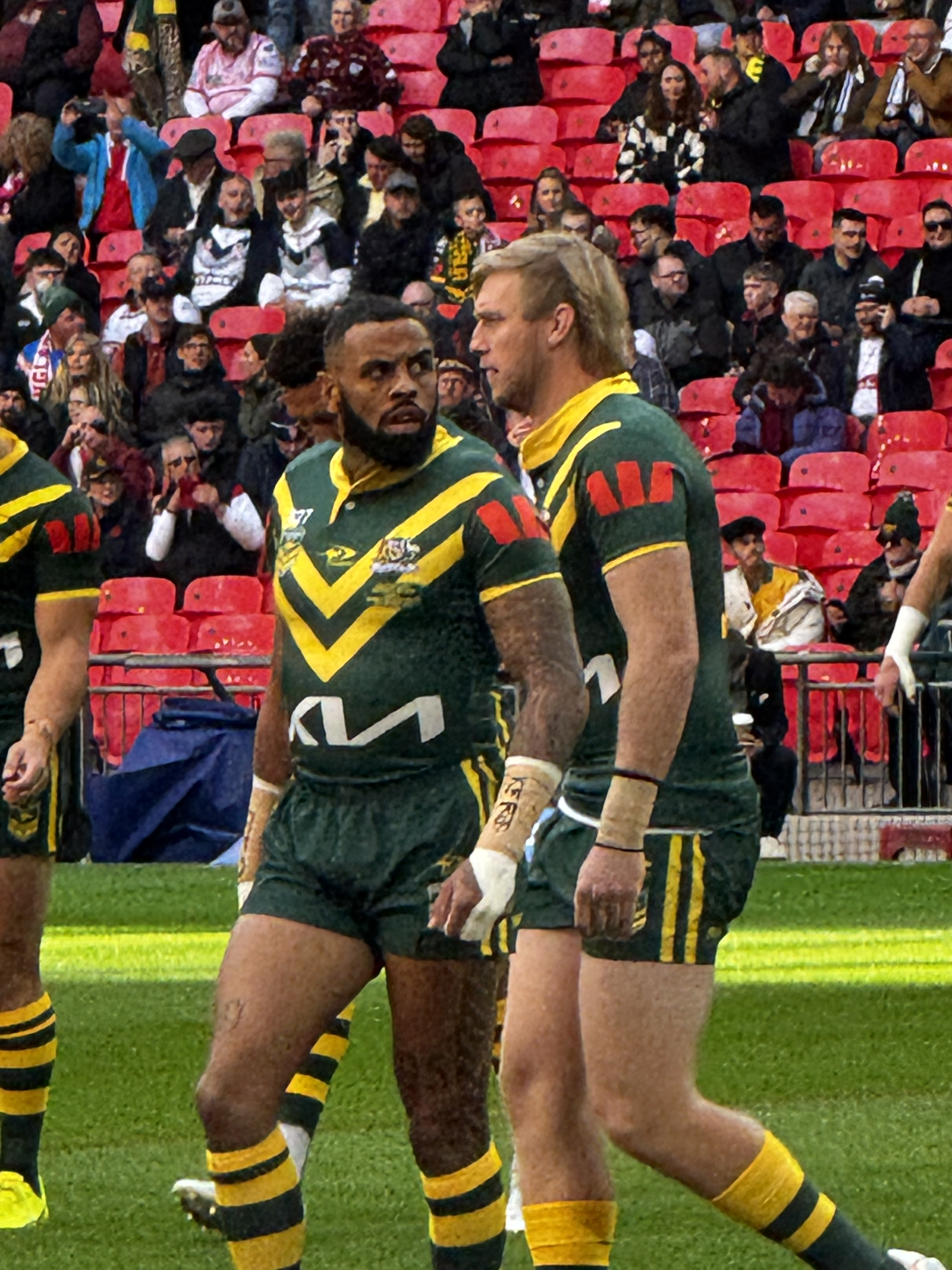
Addo-Carr warming up alongside Lindsay Smith for Australia in 2025

== Honours ==
Club: Melbourne Storm

- 2017 Minor Premiership Winners
- 2017 NRL Grand Final Winners
- 2018 World Club Challenge Winners
- 2019 Minor Premiership Winners
- 2020 NRL Grand Final Winners
- 2021 Minor Premiership Winners

Representative

- 2018 State of Origin series Winners
- 2019 State of Origin series Winners
- 2021 State of Origin series Winners

International

- 2019 Rugby League World Cup 9s Winners
- 2021 Rugby League World Cup winners

== Statistics ==
Year	Team	Games	Tries	Goals	Pts
2016	Wests Tigers	9	6		24
2017	Melbourne Storm	27	23		92
2018	Melbourne Storm	25	18		72
2019	Melbourne Storm	23	16		64
2020	Melbourne Storm	21	16		64
2021	Melbourne Storm	22	23	1	94
2022	Canterbury-Bankstown Bulldogs	23	16		64
2023	Canterbury-Bankstown Bulldogs	15	11		44
2024	Canterbury-Bankstown Bulldogs	14	11		44
2025	Parramatta Eels	22	19		76
2026	Parramatta Eels	6	4		16
	Totals	207	163	1	654
