= Waratah Shield =

Rugby union competition in Australia

The Waratah Shield is a rugby union knock-out competition for high school teams from New South Wales and the Australian Capital Territory, Australia. First contested in 1963, it is organised by New South Wales Rugby Union in conjunction with NSW Schools' Rugby Union and NSW Combined High Schools and attracts around 100 entries each year.

St Edmund's College, Canberra is the most successful school with fourteen victories, until 2004, when the ACT was released due to their dominance. The NSW Schools Rugby Union asked ACT schools to 'show cause' as to why they should stay in the competition. The injustice of the exclusion was the subject of an adjournment statement from House of Representative Member for Canberra Annette Ellis in the Australian Parliament.

The Shield was not contested from 2018 until it was relaunched in 2022. Finals have been live streamed on NSW Rugby TV. Replays and highlights from the 2023 Final are also available.

== Notable players ==
Many notable rugby players, including Wallaby greats, took part in the Waratah Shield in their youth. Many came from St Edmund's College in Canberra, shield winners 14 times. They include Ricky Stuart in their first title win in 1984 at the Sydney Cricket Ground which brought him to the attention of the sporting public, Matt Giteau, David Furner, George Gregan, Matt Henjak, Anthony Fainga'a and Saia Fainga'a. Other notable players include Joe Roff also from Canberra who played in Marist College, Canberra's 1992 and 1993 victories, George Smith, Gordon Bray, Mark Ella, Gary Ella, Glen Ella and Lloyd Walker among others.

== Number of victories ==
A total of 18 schools have won the Waratah Shield since it began in 1963. St. Edmund's College, Canberra is the most successful school in the history of the Waratah Shield with a total of 14 victories, seven more than the next most successful schools, St Augustine's College, Brookvale, with eight titles.

School	Victories	Years won
St. Edmund's College, Canberra	14	1984, 1985, 1986, 1987, 1989, 1991, 1997, 1998, 1999, 2000, 2001, 2002, 2003, 2004
St Augustine's College, Brookvale	9	2008, 2009, 2011, 2012, 2013, 2014, 2015, 2016, 2017
Matraville Sports High School	5	1972, 1976, 1977, 1983, 2007
Randwick Boys High School	4	1963, 1975, 1978, 1982
St Stanislaus' College	4	1974, 1980, 1981, 1995
Epping Boys High School	3	1967, 1968, 1969
Marist College, Canberra	3	1988, 1992, 1993
Manly Boys High School	2	1966, 1970
North Sydney Boys High School	2	1971, 1973
Hurlstone Agricultural College	1	1964
Homebush Boys High School	1	1965
James Ruse Agricultural High School	1	1979
The Scots College	1	1990
Oakhill College	1	1994
St Patrick's College, Strathfield	1	1996
Westfields Sports High School	1	2005
Barker College	1	2006
The Hills Sports High School	1	2010
Hunter Valley Grammar School	1	2022
Central Coast Grammar School	1	2023
Farrer Memorial Agricultural High School	1	2024

== Waratah Shield premiers ==
The following table sets out winners and notable players over the history of the Waratah Shield.

Year	Champions	Runners-up	Score	Notable players
1963	Randwick Boys High School			
1964	Hurlstone Agricultural College			
1965	Homebush Boys' High School	Oakhill College	8–3	Gordon Bray
1966	Manly Boys' High School			
1967	Epping Boys' High School	Normanhurst Boys High School	9 -6	
1968	Epping Boys' High School	Manly Boys' High School		
1969	Epping Boys' High School	Matraville Sports High School		
1970	Manly Boys' High School			
1971	North Sydney Boys' High School	Randwick Boys High School		
1972	Matraville Sports High School			
1973	North Sydney Boys' High School	Randwick Boy's High School	6–3	
1974	St Stanislaus' College, Bathurst	Lyneham High School, Canberra	16–10	
1975	Randwick Boys' High School	St Stanislaus' College, Bathust	17–13	
1976	Matraville High School	North Sydney High	12–3	Gary Ella, Mark Ella, Glen Ella Lloyd Walker
1977	Matraville High School	Randwick Boys' High School	25–3	Mark Ella
1978	Randwick Boys' High School	Chevalier College	7–0	
1979	James Ruse Agricultural High School	Birrong Boys High	15–7	
1980	St Stanislaus' College, Bathurst	North Sydney Boys High	26–15	
1981	St Stanislaus' College, Bathurst	Matraville High School		James Grant
1982	Randwick Boys' High School	St Edmund's College, Canberra	10–6	
1983	Matraville High School	St. Stanislaus' College, Bathurst	13–9	
1984	St Edmund's College, Canberra	Cranbrook School, Sydney	14–4	Ricky Stuart
1985	St Edmund's College, Canberra	Oakhill College	22–4	
1986	St Edmund's College, Canberra	Killarney Heights High School	38–0	David Furner, Matt Pini
1987	St Edmund's College, Canberra	Randwick Boy's High	11–3	
1988	Marist College, Canberra	Oakhill College	13–3	
1989	St Edmund's College, Canberra	St Stanislaus' College, Bathurst	9–6	George Gregan
1990	The Scots College	St Edmund's College, Canberra	6–0	
1991	St Edmund's College, Canberra	Scots College, Sydney	25–18	
1992	Marist College, Canberra	St Stanislaus College, Bathurst	38–8	Joe Roff
1993	Marist College, Canberra	Oakhill College	29–14	
1994	Oakhill College	Marist College, Canberra	24–20	
1995	St Stanislaus' College, Bathurst	Daramalan College, Canberra	22–15	
1996	St Patrick's College, Strathfield	Marist College, Canberra	24–23	
1997	St Edmund's College, Canberra	St Patrick's College, Strathfield	50–7	
1998	St Edmund's College, Canberra	Cromer High School	45–22	George Smith
1999	St Edmund's College, Canberra	St Patrick's College, Strathfield	27–15	Matt Giteau, Matt Henjak
2000	St Edmund's College, Canberra			
2001	St Edmund's College, Canberra			
2002	St Edmund's College, Canberra	St. Stanislaus' College, Bathurst	41–22	
2003	St Edmund's College, Canberra	Prairiewood High School	51–0	Anthony Fainga'a, Saia Fainga'a
2004	St Edmund's College, Canberra	Rankwick Boys High School		
2005	Westfields Sports High School	Barker College		
2006	Barker College			
2007	Matraville Sports High School			
2008	St. Augustine's College, Brookvale	St. Stanislaus' College, Bathurst	26–16	
2009	St. Augustine's College, Brookvale	St. Stanislaus' College, Bathurst	18–13	
2010	The Hills Sports High School	St. Augustine's College, Brookvale	38–18	
2011	St. Augustine's College, Brookvale	The Hills Sports High School	20–13	
2012	St. Augustine's College, Brookvale	Oakhill College	27–17	
2013	St. Augustine's College, Brookvale	Oakhill College	64–21	
2014	St. Augustine's College, Brookvale	Oakhill College	20–13	
2015	St. Augustine's College, Brookvale	Hills Sport High School	26–16	
2016	St. Augustine's College, Brookvale	Oakhill College	13–10	
2017	St. Augustine's College, Brookvale	Hills Sport High School	forfeit	
2018	Not contested			
2019	Not contested			
2020	Not contested			
2021	Not contested			
2022	Hunter Valley Grammar School	Randwick Boys High School	22-12	
2023	Central Coast Grammar School	Randwick Boys High School	25-18	(*18-18 at full time, match won in extra time)
2024	Farrer Memorial Agricultural High School	Central Coast Grammar School	7-0	

== See also ==
- Rugby union trophies and awards
