= IRB International U19 Player of the Year =

International U19 Player of the Year
- Presented by: IRB
- First award: 1999
- Final award: 2007

The IRB International U19 Player of the Year was awarded by the International Rugby Board in the autumn each year from 2002 to 2007. In 2008, it was combined with the IRB International U21 Player of the Year into the IRB Junior Player of the Year award.

== List of winners ==
Year	Winner	Country
1999	Jerry Collins	New Zealand
2000	Gerrard Fasavalu	New Zealand
2001	Gavin Henson	Wales
2002	Luke McAlister	New Zealand
2003	Jean-Baptiste Peyras-Loustalet	France
2004	Jeremy Thrush	New Zealand
2005	Isaia Toeava	New Zealand
2006	Josh Holmes	Australia
2007	Robert Fruean	New Zealand

== List of other IRB Awards ==
- IRB International Player of the Year
- IRB International Team of the Year
- IRB International Coach of the Year
- IRB International U21 Player of the Year
- IRB International Sevens Team of the Year
- IRB International Sevens Player of the Year
- Spirit of Rugby Award
- Vernon Pugh Award for Distinguished Service
- IRB Referee Award for Distinguished Service
- IRB International Women's Personality of the Year
- IRB Development Award
- IRB Chairman's Award
