= Lloyd Walker (rugby union) =

Australian rugby union international

- Full name: Lloyd Frederick Walker
- Born: 7 January 1959 (age 67) Sydney, Australia
- Height: 5 ft 10 in (178 cm)
- Weight: 187 lb (85 kg)

Rugby union career
- Position: Centre / Fly-half
International career
Years	Team	Apps	(Points)
1988–89	Australia	8	(8)

Lloyd Frederick Walker (born 7 January 1959) is an Australian former rugby union international.

An Indigenous Australian (Bidjigal), Walker was born and raised in Sydney, attending Matraville High School. He was captain of the school's 1st XV and featured in two Waratah Shield wins.

Walker was capped eight times for the Wallabies, debuting at fly-half in the 1988 Bledisloe Cup matches. The rest of his appearances were as an inside centre and included three caps on the 1989 British Lions tour to Australia. He played 225 first-grade matches for Randwick and was a member of nine premiership teams.

== See also ==
- List of Australia national rugby union players
