= Pershing Cup =

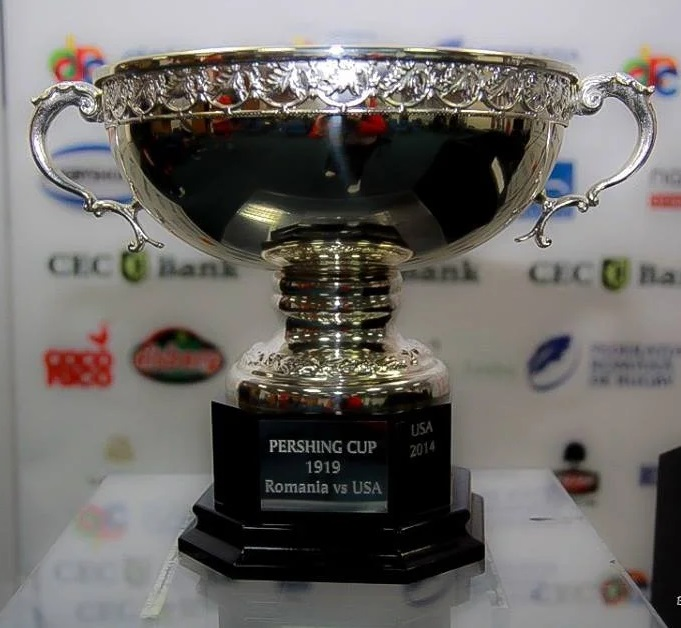
Pershing Cup Trophy.

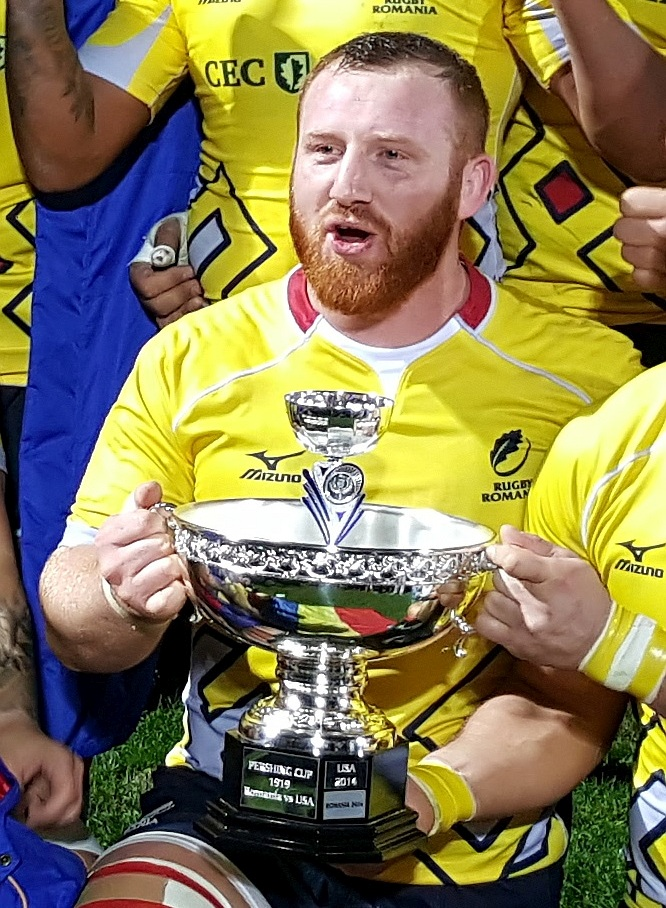
Romanian prop Ionel Badiu, with the Pershing cup trophy, in 2016.

The Pershing Cup is a trophy contested between the rugby union teams of Romania ("The Oaks") and the United States ("The Eagles").

The cup is named after US Army General John J. Pershing, who organized the Inter-Allied Games, a one-off multi-sport event held from 22 June to 6 July 1919 in Paris. A Romanian team of military personnel, played their first ever international test against American military members. The USA military were 21-0 winners.

The cup was established in 2014 by the FRR. The Pershing Cup is contested each time USA and Romania meet in a senior international test match. The holder retains the cup unless the challenger wins the match in normal time. In the event of a draw, the previous winner retains the trophy. The trophy has been contested seven times since its inception with the USA leading the series 5–2. Prior to the establishment of the cup, the sides had met six times between 1919 and 2012, with the USA winning five times and Romania winning once.

== Summary ==
Host	P	Romania	United States	D	Romania points	United States points
Romania	6	1	5	0	104	178
United States	1	1	0	0	22	20
Overall	7	2	5	0	126	198

=== Records ===
Note: Date shown in brackets indicates when the record was or last set. Updated (14 November 2026)

Record	Romania	United States
Longest winning streak	1 (5 Jul 2024)	2 (15 Nov 2025 – present)
Largest points for
Home	23 (12 Nov 2016)	20 (5 Jul 2024)
Away	22 (5 Jul 2024)	53 (14 Nov 2026)
Largest winning margin
Home	13 (12 Nov 2016)	—N/a
Away	2 (5 Jul 2024)	29 (14 Nov 2026)

== Previous winners ==
Year	Date	Home	Score	Away	Cup Winner	Venue	Ref
2014	8 November	Romania	17–27	United States	United States	Stadionul Arcul de Triumf, Bucharest	
2016	12 November	Romania	23–10	United States	Romania	Stadionul Arcul de Triumf, Bucharest	
2018	17 November	Romania	5–31	United States	United States	Stadionul Arcul de Triumf, Bucharest	
2023	5 August	Romania	17–31	United States	United States	Stadionul Arcul de Triumf, Bucharest	
2024	5 July	United States	20–22	Romania	Romania	SeatGeek Stadium, Bridgeview, Illinois	
2025	15 November	Romania	18–26	United States	United States	Stadionul Arcul de Triumf, Bucharest	
2026	14 November	Romania	24–53	United States	United States	Stadionul Arcul de Triumf, Bucharest	
