= Jean-Baptiste Peyras-Loustalet =

French rugby union player (born 1984)

- Born: 5 January 1984 (age 42) Pau, France
- Height: 1.88 m (6 ft 2 in)
- Weight: 93 kg (14 st 9 lb)

Rugby union career
- Position: Wing
Senior career
Years	Team	Apps	(Points)
2002–2005	Pau	35	(30)
2005–2007	Castres	38	(65)
2005–2007	Bayonne	70	(130)
2011–2012	Montpellier	10	(0)
2012–2013	Béziers	4	(0)
2013	Bordeaux Bègles	2	(0)
2013–	Béziers	77	(68)
- Correct as of 04:29, 1 March 2010 (UTC)
International career
Years	Team	Apps	(Points)
2008	France	1	(0)
- Correct as of 04:29, 1 March 2010 (UTC)

Jean-Baptiste Peyras-Loustalet (born 5 January 1984) is a French rugby union player. Peyras-Loustalet, who is a winger, plays his club rugby for Montpellier after signing from Bayonne. He made his debut for France against Australia on 5 July 2008.

In 2003 Peyras-Loustalet was named as the IRB International U19 Player of the Year.
