= Fabien Cibray =

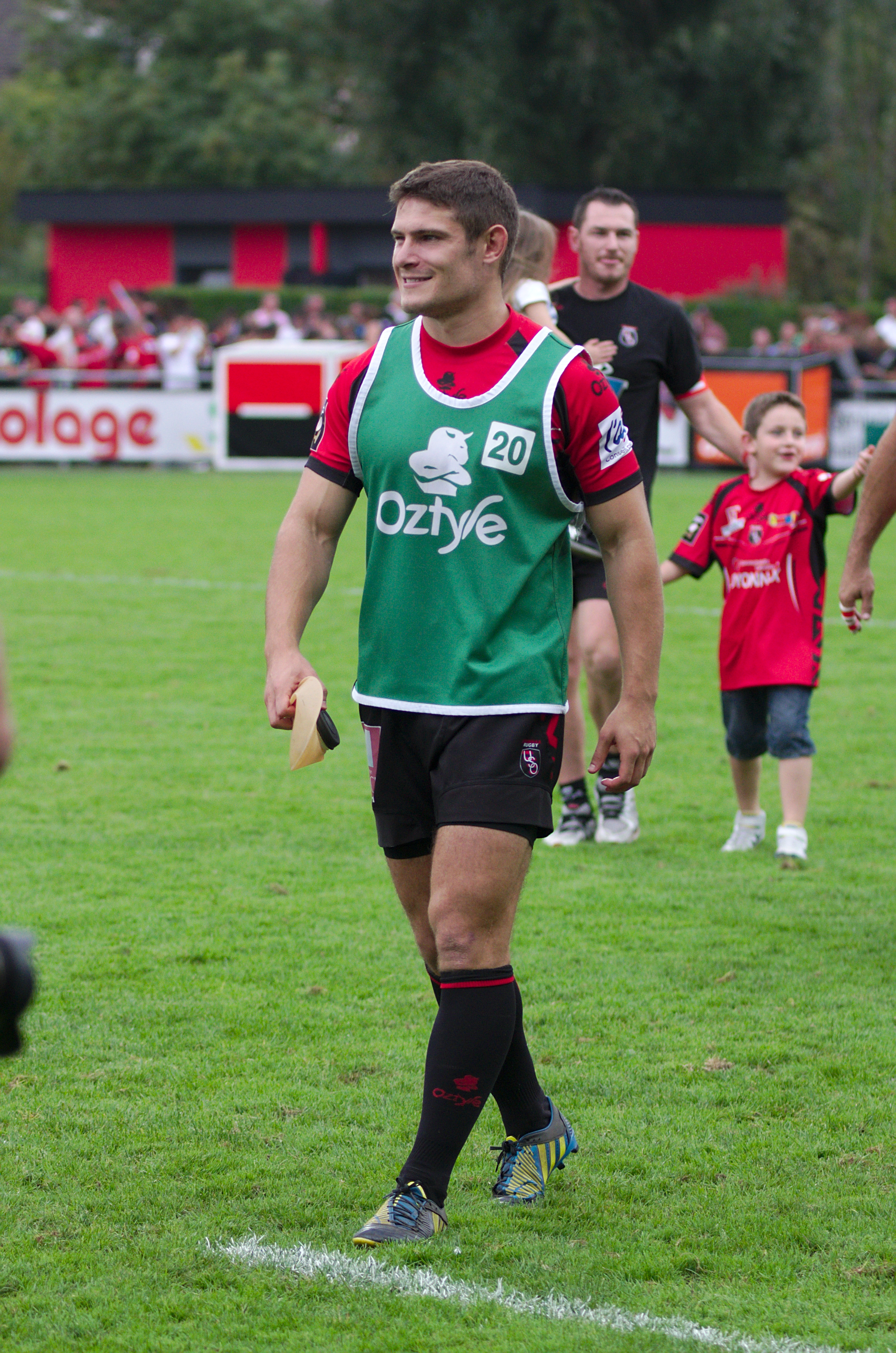
- Born: 15 October 1985 (age 41) Auch, France
- Height: 1.78 m (5 ft 10 in)
- Weight: 81 kg (12 st 11 lb)

Rugby union career
- Position: Scrum-half
Senior career
Years	Team	Apps	(Points)
2003–2007	Pau	61	(26)
2007–2010	Biarritz	30	(28)
2010–2012	Toulon	30	(29)
2012–2013	Lyon	25	(20)
2013–2017	Oyonnax	97	(45)
2017–2018	Provence	18	(10)
Coaching career
- Years: Team
- 2018–: Provence

Fabien Cibray (born 15 October 1985) is a former French rugby union player and current coach. His position was scrum-half and he currently manages Provence Rugby in the Rugby Pro D2. He began his career with Pau before moving to Biarritz Olympique in 2007. He joined Toulon in 2010. He moved to Lyon OU in the second division in 2012.
