= Super Rugby Trophy =

The Super Rugby Trophy is a sterling silver trophy awarded to the winner of the Super Rugby, a rugby union competition, final. It is a rotating trophy, held only during the offseason and returned to the competition organisers in time for it to be awarded to the next season's champions.

Super Rugby Trophy
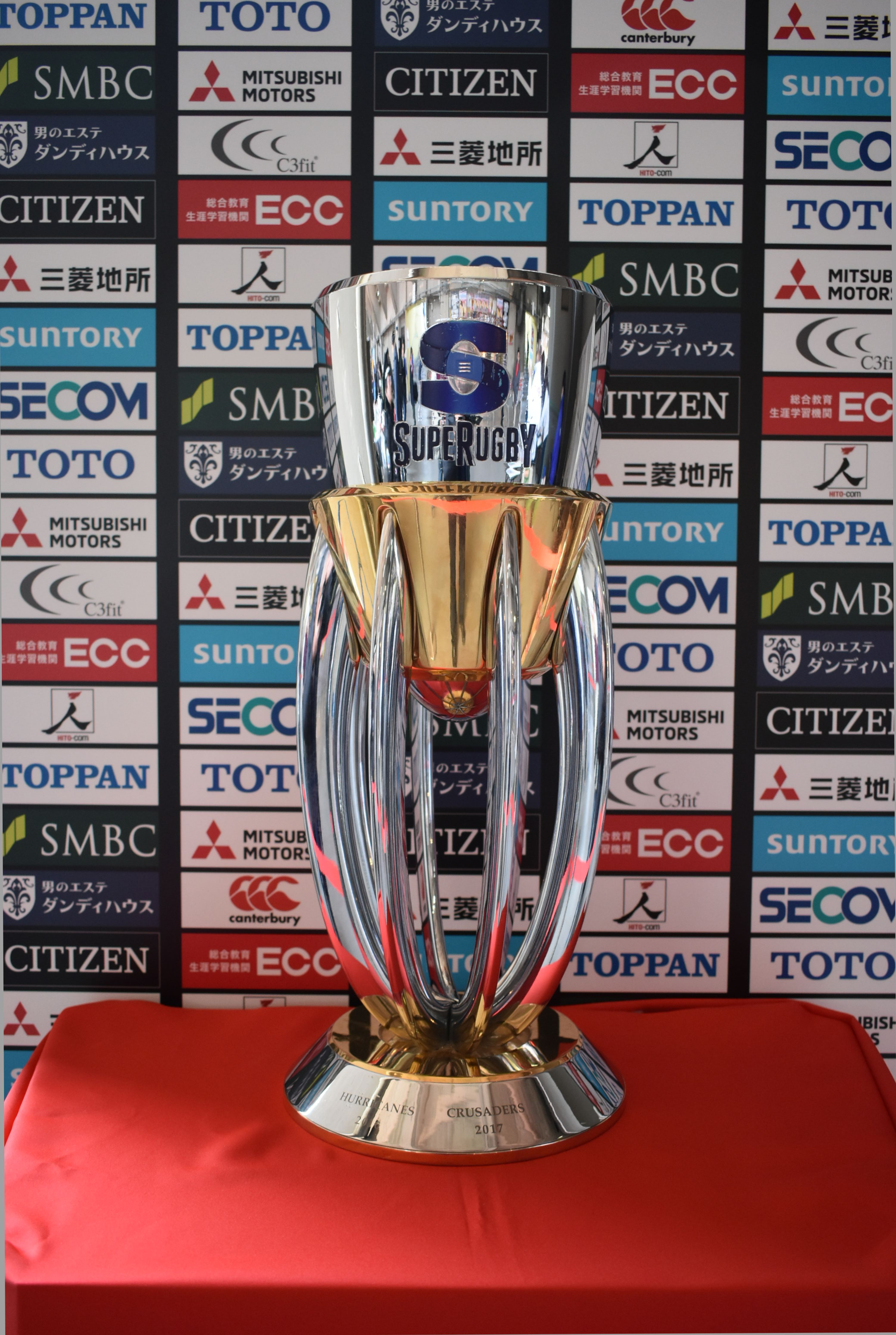
Trophy in Japan, 2019.

== Original trophy ==
Jens Hansen of Nelson, New Zealand, made the original trophy by hand, and it was first awarded to the Crusaders after winning the 2006 Super 14 Final. The same workshop made the gold ring in Peter Jackson's The Lord of the Rings trilogy. Three different silversmiths constructed the trophy. This required soldering together a number of silver sheets as well as sanding, buffing and polishing. The trophy is 49 cm high and weighs 2.7 kg.

The trophy was unveiled in Wellington for the first time on Tuesday, 7 February 2006. The public was able to view the trophy for the first time on 10 February when the Blues played the Hurricanes in the Super 14's opening match in Auckland. The 2006 Super 14 season was the first season that the trophy was used.

== 2011 trophy ==
In 2011, a new trophy was announced that featured the Super 14 logo on a globe, itself on a four-sided twisted spiral. Fraser Holland, the New Zealand Rugby Union sponsorship and marketing manager, oversaw the construction of the trophy. On 30 June 2011, SANZAR unveiled the new trophy which would first be awarded to the winners of the Super Rugby final scheduled for Saturday, 9 July 2011.

The trophy was crafted from solid stainless steel and polished to a mirror finish. It has a height of 65 cm and a mass of 18 kilograms and was designed by the company responsible for the 2000 Olympic Torch, Blue Sky Design of Sydney. The three curved legs, represent the Conferences involved in the Super Rugby competition, and the colour on each leg corresponds to the Conferences with gold for Australia, black for New Zealand, and green for South Africa.

== See also ==
- List of Super Rugby champions
