= Gary Ella =

Australian rugby union player

- Born: Gary Albert Ella; 23 July 1960 (age 66) La Perouse, New South Wales, Australia
- Notable relative(s): Glen Ella (brother); Mark Ella (brother)

Rugby union career
Amateur team(s)
| Years | Team | Apps | (Points) |
| 1978–91 | Randwick | | |
Provincial / State sides
| Years | Team | Apps | (Points) |
| 1981–88 | New South Wales | 26 | (16) |
International career
| Years | Team | Apps | (Points) |
| 1982–88 | Australia | 6 | (8) |
- Correct as of 20 October 2016

Gary Albert Ella (born 23 July 1960) is an Australian former rugby union player. Ella represented Australia six times between 1982 and 1988.

Gary moved to Lake Macquarie in 2022 and has joined forces with first-grade coach Seru Rainima at Lake Macquarie Rugby Club. Gary will work with Seru and mainly look after the backline coaching.
