= World Rugby Junior Player of the Year =

- Presented by: World Rugby
- First award: 2008
- Final award: 2019

The World Rugby Junior Player of the Year is an accolade awarded annually by the World Rugby. It is awarded to the player of the tournament in that year's World Rugby Under 20 Championship. It replaces the now defunct U21 Player of the Year and the U19 Player of the Year. From 2008 until 2013, it was the IRB Junior Player of the Year. Since 2014, following the International Rugby Board becoming World Rugby, the award has been titled the World Rugby Junior Player of the Year.

== List of Winners and Nominees ==
Year	Winner	Other nominees	Ref
2008	Luke Braid (New Zealand)	(New Zealand) Chris Smith (England) Joe Simpson	
2009	Aaron Cruden (New Zealand)	(New Zealand) Winston Stanley (England) Carl Fearns (Australia) Richard Kingi	
2010	Julian Savea (New Zealand)	(New Zealand) Tyler Bleyendaal (Australia) Robbie Coleman (Argentina) Ignacio Rodriguez Muedra	
2011	George Ford (England)	(New Zealand) Luke Whitelock (New Zealand) Sam Cane	
2012	Jan Serfontein (South Africa)	(Ireland) JJ Hanrahan (South Africa) Shaun Adendorff	
2013	Sam Davies (Wales)	(New Zealand) Ardie Savea (England) Jack Clifford	
2014	Handré Pollard (South Africa)	(Ireland) Garry Ringrose (New Zealand) Tevita Li (England) Nathan Earle	
2015	James Chisholm (England)	(New Zealand) Akira Ioane (New Zealand) Tevita Li (Australia) Jonah Placid	
2016	Max Deegan (Ireland)	(England) Harry Mallinder (New Zealand) Shaun Stevenson (Japan) Ataata Moeakiola (South Africa) Curwin Bosch	
2017	Juarno Augustus (South Africa)	(England) Zach Mercer (New Zealand) Will Jordan (New Zealand) Tiaan Falcon (England) Gabriel Ibitoye	
2018	Jordan Joseph (France)	(France) Romain Ntamack (England) Gabriel Ibitoye (England) Jordan Olowofela	
2019	Juan Pablo Castro (Argentina)	(Australia) Fraser McReight (France) Louis Carbonel (South Africa) Jaden Hendrikse	
