= IRB Development Award =

- Presented by: World Rugby
- First award: 2002
- Final award: 2012

The IRB Development Award was previously presented by the IRB from 2002 to 2012.

== Recipients ==
Year	Recipients	Refs
2002	(England) John Broadfoot	
2003	(Cambodia) Tan Theany (France) (Cambodia) Philippe Monnin	
2004	(Senegal) Guedel Ndiaye	
2005	(France) Robert Antonin	
2006	(Canada) Mike Luke	
2007	(Jamaica) Jacob Thompson	
2008	Tag Rugby Development Trust (England) Martin Hansford	
2009	(Taiwan) Lin Chia-Sheng	
2010	(Australia) Brian O’Shea	
2011	(United States) Rookie Rugby	
2012	(South Africa) South African Rugby Union	
