= IRB Chairman's Award =

Chairman's Award
- Presented by: IRB
- First award: 2001
- Final award: 2005

The IRB Chairman's Award was awarded by World Rugby until 2005.

== List of winners ==
Year	Name
2001	(New Zealand) Kath McLean (New Zealand) Sir Terry McLean; Albert Farasse (Australia) John Eales
2002	(Scotland) Bill McLaren; George Pippos (posthumously)
2003	(Wales) Vernon Pugh
2004	(France) Marcel Martin
2005	(Wales) Sir Tasker Watkins V.C., G.B.E, D.L
