= List of sport awards =

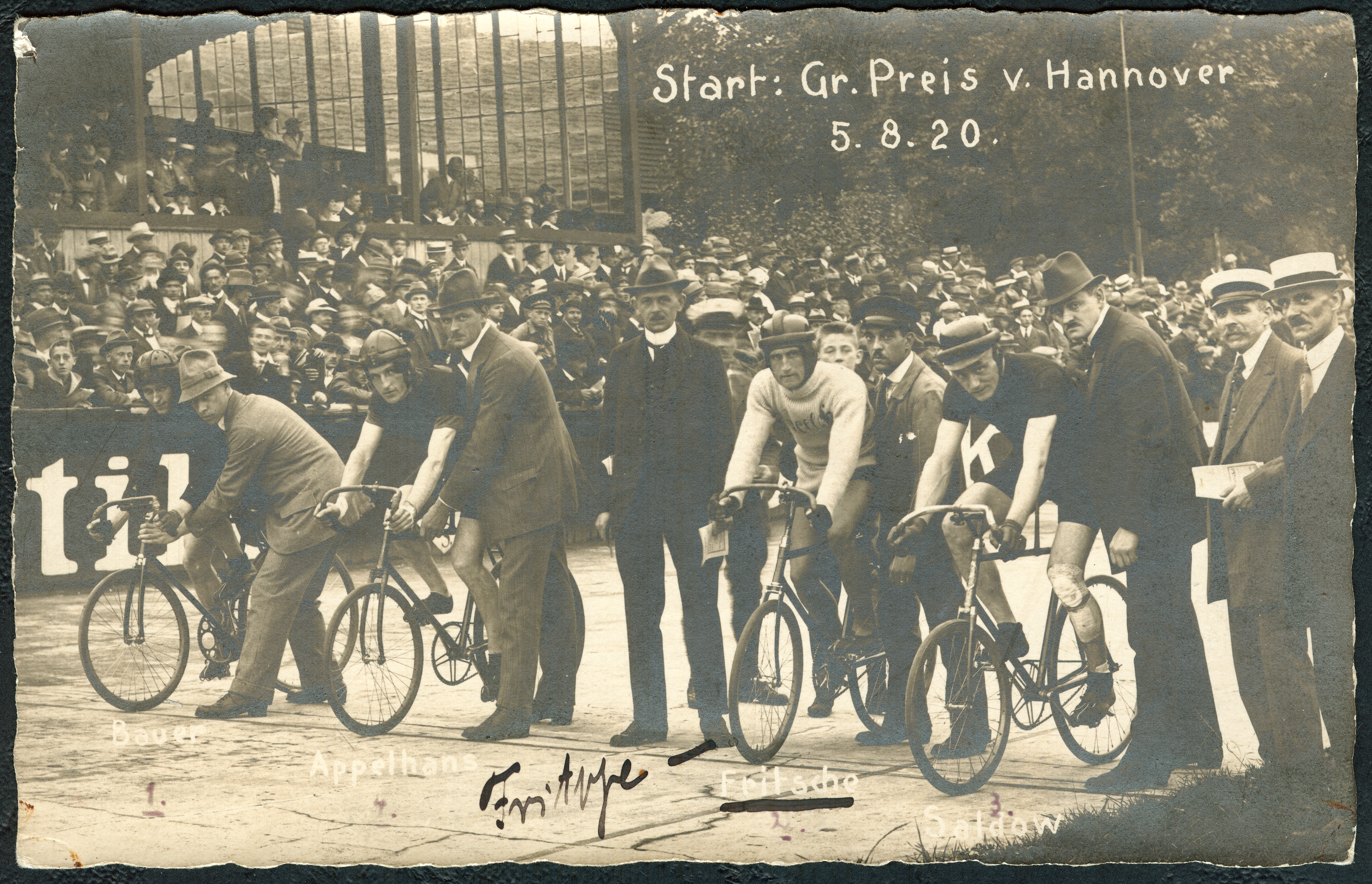
Start of the Hanover Grand Prix on August 5, 1920

This list of sport awards is an index to articles about notable medals, prizes, and other awards in the field of sport. It is organized by sport. For a given sport, awards are often given for the best players or teams in each country.

== General and miscellaneous ==
- BBC Sports Personality of the Year:
  - BBC Overseas Sports Personality of the Year
  - BBC Sports Personality of the Year Coach Award
  - BBC Sports Personality of the Year Helen Rollason Award
  - BBC Sports Personality of the Year Lifetime Achievement Award
  - BBC Sports Personality Team of the Year Award
  - BBC Sports Unsung Hero Award
  - BBC Young Sports Personality of the Year
- Egebergs Ærespris – to athletes who excel in more than one sport (Norway)
- ESPY Awards
- Golden Globes (Portugal)
- James E. Sullivan Award – to outstanding amateur athletes in the United States (Amateur Athletic Union)
- Kids' Choice Sports Awards
- Laureus World Sports Awards
- NACDA Directors' Cup – to the colleges and universities with the most success in collegiate athletics (National Association of Collegiate Directors of Athletics)
- NXT Year-End Awards
- Olympic Cup – to an association or institution which has rendered distinguished service to sport or contributed successfully to the promotion of the Olympic idea (International Olympic Committee)
- Slammy Awards

== American football and Canadian football ==
- Associated Press College Football Player of the Year – to the most outstanding collegiate football player in the United States (Associated Press)
- Grey Cup – to the champions of the Canadian Football League
- Heisman Trophy – to outstanding college football players whose performance best exhibits the pursuit of excellence with integrity (Heisman Trophy Trust)
- Pro Football Hall of Fame
- Vince Lombardi Trophy – to the winning team of the National Football League's championship game, the Super Bowl

== Association football ==
A–E

- Albo Panchina d'Oro – to the best Italian coach of the Serie A
- Best European Goalkeeper
- Best Male Soccer Player ESPY Award
- Best Soccer Player ESPY Award
- Bota de Prata – to the top scorer in the Portuguese Primeira Liga
- Brian Clough Trophy – to the winners of any league, cup or friendly match between Derby County and Nottingham Forest
- CAF Clubs of the 20th Century – a ranking of the most successful clubs of the 20th century in Africa
- CNID Awards – to players and coaches in the Portuguese Primeira Liga and to Portuguese players and coaches in other countries
- Coach of the Year (Romania)
- Copa Libertadores – to the winners of the Copa Libertadores
- Copa Sudamericana – to the winners of the Copa Sudamericana
- CSL Golden Boot – to the top goalscorer in the Canadian Soccer League
- Det Gyldne Bur – to the best goalkeeper in Danish football
- DZFoot d'Or – to the Algerian player considered to have performed the best over the previous year
- European Champion Clubs' Cup – to the winners of the UEFA Champions League
- European Golden Shoe – to the leading goalscorer in league matches from the top division of every European national league

F

- FA Cup – to the winners of the FA Cup
- FAM Football Awards (Malaysia)
- FIFA Ballon d'Or – given annually to the player who is considered to have performed the best in the previous season
- FIFA Clubs of the 20th Century – a ranking of the most successful clubs of the 20th century
- FIFA Development Award – for the development of football in countries judged to need it most
- FIFA Fair Play Award – for exemplary civil or sporting behavior
- FIFA Order of Merit – for significant contributions to football
- FIFA Player of the Century – to the greatest player of the 20th century
- FIFA Presidential Award
- FIFA Puskás Award – to the player judged to have scored the most aesthetically significant and "most beautiful" goal of the year
- FIFA World Cup awards
- FIFA World Cup Dream Team – an all-star squad published in 2002 and composed of some of the best players of all time
- FIFA World Cup – to the winners of the FIFA World Cup
- FIFA World Player of the Year – to the players who were thought to be the best in the world; replaced by the FIFA Ballon d'Or
- Footballer of the Year (Argentina)
- Footballer of the Year (Austria)
- Footballer of the Year (Azerbaijan)
- Footballer of the Year (Baltic and Commonwealth of Independent States)
- Footballer of the Year (Belgium)
- Footballer of the Year (Bulgaria)
- Footballer of the Year (Chile)
- Footballer of the Year (Croatia)
- Footballer of the Year (Czech Republic)
- Footballer of the Year (Czechoslovakia)
- Footballer of the Year (Denmark)
- Footballer of the Year (Estonia)
- Footballer of the Year (Finland)
- Footballer of the Year (Georgia)
- Footballer of the Year (Germany)
- Footballer of the Year (Ireland, Republic of)
- Footballer of the Year (Israel)
- Footballer of the Year (Kazakhstan)
- Footballer of the Year (Latvia)
- Footballer of the Year (Liechtenstein)
- Footballer of the Year (Lithuania)
- Footballer of the Year (Luxembourg)
- Footballer of the Year (Macedonia)
- Footballer of the Year (Moldova)
- Footballer of the Year (Netherlands)
- Footballer of the Year (Norway)
- Footballer of the Year (Paraguay)
- Footballer of the Year (Portugal)
- Footballer of the Year (Romania)
- Footballer of the Year – given by Futbol (Russia)
- Footballer of the Year – given by Sport-Express (Russia)
- Footballer of the Year (Serbia)
- Footballer of the Year (Slovakia)
- Footballer of the Year (Soviet Union)
- Footballer of the Year (Sweden)
- Footballer of the Year (Switzerland)
- Foreign Footballer of the Year (Romania)
- Football Manager of the Year (Germany)

G–M

- Goal of the Month (Germany)
- Goal of the Year (Germany)
- Golden Ball (Czech Republic)
- Golden Ball (Portugal)
- Golden Foot – to players who stand out for their athletic achievements and personality
- Guerin d'Oro – to the player in the Italian Serie A with at least 19 games played who has obtained the best average media rating
- Heart of Hajduk Award – to Croatian club HNK Hajduk Split's best player
- Hong Kong Top Footballer Awards
- IFFHS World's Best Goalkeeper
- Iran football awards
- Lennart Johanssons Pokal – to the winners of the Swedish Allsvenskan
- MLS Golden Boot – to Major League Soccer's regular season leading scorer

N–Z

- Norwegian Football Association Gold Watch – to players who reach 25 caps for the Norwegian national team
- NTF football awards – to players and coaches in Norwegian football
- Oscar del Calcio – to players and coaches in Italian football
- Pallone d'Argento – to the Serie A player deemed to have displayed the best civil and sporting behavior over the previous season
- Piłka Nożna plebiscite awards – to players and coaches in Polish football
- Premier League Golden Boot – to the top goalscorer at the end of the Premier League season
- Prva HNL Player of the Year – to the best player in Croatian football
- PSAP Awards (Greece):
- PSL Awards (South Africa):
  - PSL Club Rookie of the Year
  - PSL Coach of the Season
  - PSL Footballer of the Year
  - PSL Goalkeeper of the Season
  - PSL Player of the Season
  - PSL Players' Player of the Season
  - PSL Referee of the Season
- Rinus Michels Awards (Netherlands)
- Silver Ball – for the best goal scored for the Estonian national team
- Sportske Novosti award – to the best player in the world (Croatia)
- Sportske novosti Yellow Shirt award – to the best player in the Croatian Prva HNL
- Ubaldo Fillol Award – to the goalkeeper with the lowest goals-to-games ratio in the Argentine Primera División
- UEFA Best Player in Europe
- UEFA Cup – to the winners of the UEFA Europa League
- Women's Professional Soccer awards
- World Team of the 20th Century – an all-star squad published in 1998 and composed of some of the best players of all time
- Young Player of the Year (Ireland, Republic of)

== Australian rules football ==
- AFL Army Award – to players who produce significant acts of bravery or selflessness to promote the cause of their team during a game
- AFL Rising Star – to a standout young player in the Australian Football League
- AFL Players Association awards – a group of awards given annually to players in the Australian Football League, voted for by all AFL players
- All-Australian team – an all-star team of Australian rules footballers selected by a panel at the end of each season
- Brownlow Medal – to the "fairest and best" player in the Australian Football League during the regular season as determined by votes cast by the officiating field umpires after each game
- Coleman Medal – to the Australian Football League player who kicks the most goals in regular-season matches in that year
- Goal of the Year – for the best goal of the season
- Herald Sun Player of the Year – a media award for the Australian Football League given by Melbourne newspaper the Herald Sun
- Jock McHale Medal – to the coach of the winning premiership team in the Australian Football League
- Leigh Matthews Trophy – to the most valuable player in the Australian Football League
- Lou Richards Medal – to the best player in the Australian Football League as voted on by the Sunday Footy Show panel
- Mark of the Year – for the best mark of the season. A mark is the action of a player cleanly catching a kicked ball that has travelled more than 15 metres (49 ft) without the ball hitting the ground
- Michael Tuck Medal – to the "fairest and best" player in the AFL Pre-season Cup Final
- Norm Smith Medal – given in the AFL Grand Final to the player adjudged by an independent panel of experts to have been the best player in the match

== Auto racing ==
- Astor Cup – originally awarded to Astor Challenge Cup winners (1915–1916), now awarded to the IndyCar Series champion
- Bill France Cup – to the NASCAR Cup Series champion
- Borg-Warner Trophy – to the champion of the Indianapolis 500
- Gordon Bennett Cup – a defunct trophy to be raced for annually by the automobile clubs of various countries
- Harley J. Earl Trophy – to the champion of the Daytona 500
- Sprint Cup – formerly awarded to the NASCAR Sprint Cup Series champion
- The Wally – to the winners of a national event of the National Hot Rod Association
- Vanderbilt Cup – the first major trophy in American auto racing

== Badminton ==
- BWF Awards

== Baseball ==
- Baseball Hall of Fame (disambiguation)
- Commissioner's Trophy – to the Major League Baseball team that wins the World Series
- Cy Young Award – to the best pitchers in Major League Baseball
- Gold Glove Award – to the Major League Baseball players judged to have exhibited superior individual fielding performances at each fielding position
- Manager of the Year Award – to the best managers in Major League Baseball
- Most Valuable Player Award – to the regular-season most valuable players in Major League Baseball
- Olympic medalists
- Rookie of the Year Award – to Major League Baseball's best regular-season rookies

== Basketball ==
- European awards:
  - Euroscar
  - FIBA Europe Player of the Year Award
  - Mr. Europa
- Naismith Memorial Basketball Hall of Fame
- National Basketball Association awards:
  - Bill Russell NBA Finals MVP
  - NBA Coach of the Year
  - NBA Defensive Player of the Year
  - NBA Executive of the Year
  - NBA Most Valuable Player
  - NBA Rookie of the Year
  - NBA Sixth Man of the Year
- U.S. college basketball awards:
  - Men and women:
    - Frances Pomeroy Naismith Award
    - Wooden Award
    - Naismith Award
    - NCAA basketball tournament Most Outstanding Player
    - Carol Eckman Award
  - Women only:
    - Nancy Lieberman Award
    - Wade Trophy
- Women's National Basketball Association awards:
  - Kim Perrot Sportsmanship Award
  - WNBA Coach of the Year
  - WNBA Defensive Player of the Year
  - WNBA Most Valuable Player
  - WNBA Rookie of the Year
  - WNBA Sixth Woman of the Year

== Beach soccer ==
- Beach Soccer Stars

== Boxing ==
- Golden Gloves
- Lonsdale Belt
- Olympic medalists

== Cricket ==
- Allan Border Medal
- Cricket World Cup – to the winners of the Cricket World Cup
- ICC Awards (International Cricket Council)
- The Ashes – the oldest prize in international cricket, played since 1882
- Wisden Cricketers of the Year (Wisden Cricketers' Almanack)

== Cycling ==
- UCI Women's Road World Cup

== Figure skating ==
- European Figure Skating Championships
- Four Continents Figure Skating Championships
- United States Figure Skating Championships
- World Figure Skating Championships

== Golf ==
- Curtis Cup
- Eisenhower Trophy
- Presidents Cup
- Ryder Cup
- Solheim Cup
- Walker Cup

== Horse racing ==
- Ascot Gold Cup (UK)
- Auckland Cup (New Zealand)
- Ayr Gold Cup (UK)
- Caulfield Cup (Australia)
- Cheltenham Gold Cup (UK)
- Cox Plate (Australia)
- Geraldton Gold Cup (Australia)
- Hollywood Gold Cup (USA)
- Kentucky Derby Trophy (USA)
- Melbourne Cup (Australia)
- Queen's Plate (Canada)
- Triple Crown Trophy (USA)
- Woodlawn Vase (USA)

== Ice hockey ==
=== North America ===
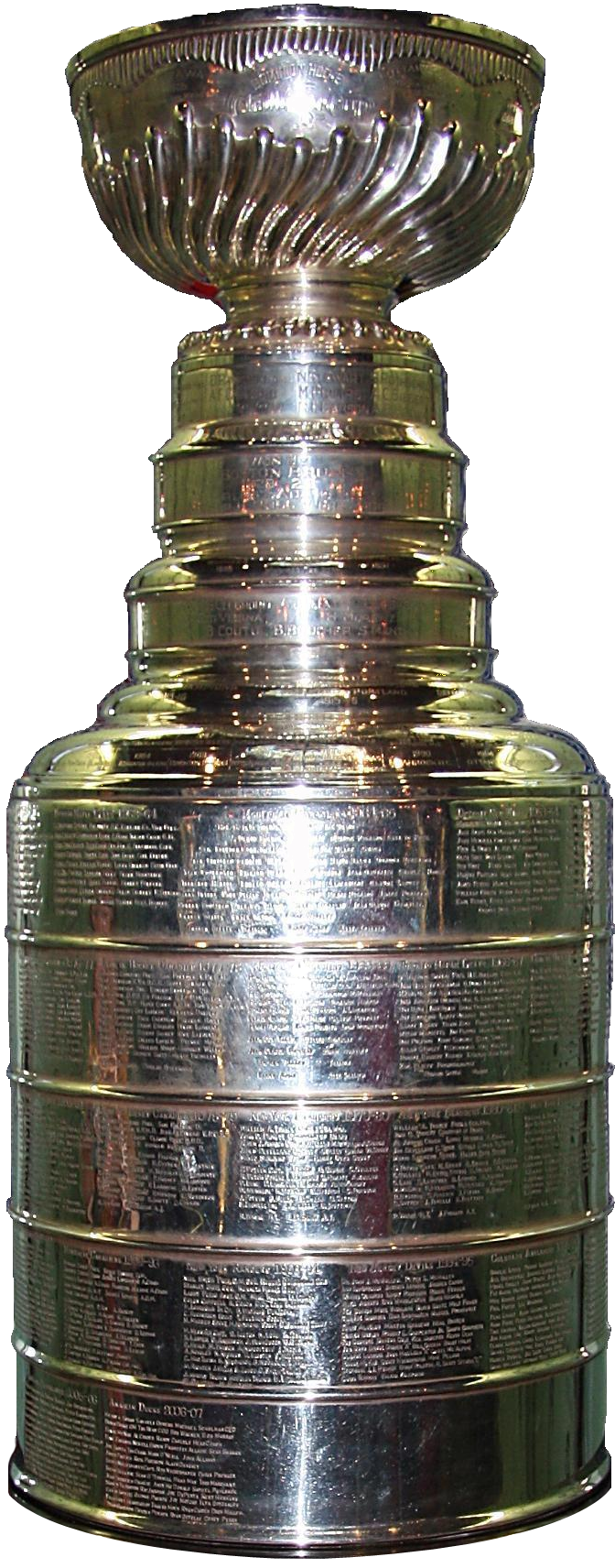
The Stanley Cup
- Allan Cup
- Art Ross Trophy
- Bill Masterton Memorial Trophy
- Calder Cup
- Calder Memorial Trophy
- Clarence S. Campbell Bowl
- Conn Smythe Trophy
- Frank J. Selke Trophy
- Hart Memorial Trophy
- Hobey Baker Award
- Jack Adams Award
- James Norris Memorial Trophy
- King Clancy Memorial Trophy
- Lady Byng Memorial Trophy
- Les Cunningham Award
- Lester Patrick Trophy
- Maurice "Rocket" Richard Trophy
- Memorial Cup
- NHL Plus-Minus Award
- Patty Kazmaier Award
- Presidents' Trophy
- Prince of Wales Trophy
- Roger Crozier Saving Grace Award
- Stanley Cup
- Ted Lindsay Award
- Turner Cup
- Vezina Trophy
- Walter Cup
- William M. Jennings Trophy

=== Sweden ===
- Guldhjälmen
- Guldpucken
- Viking Award

== Lacrosse ==
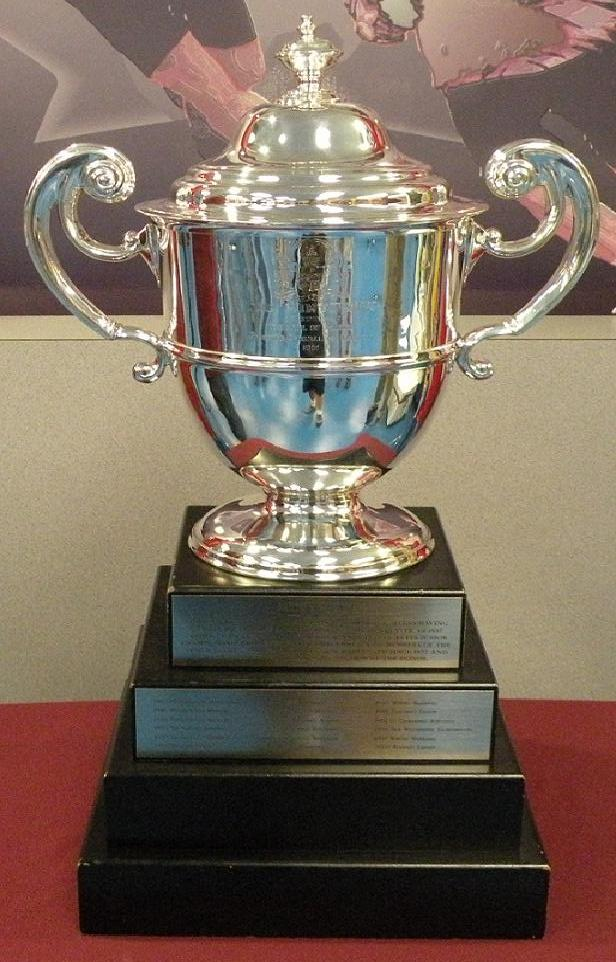
The Minto Cup
- Champion's Cup
- Ensign C. Markland Kelly, Jr. Award
- Founders Cup
- Jack Turnbull Award
- Les Bartley Award
- Les Bartley Award (Toronto Rock)
- Lt. Raymond Enners Award
- Major League Lacrosse Coach of the Year Award
- Major League Lacrosse Defensive Player of the Year Award
- Major League Lacrosse Goaltender of the Year Award
- Major League Lacrosse Most Improved Player of the Year Award
- Major League Lacrosse MVP Award
- Major League Lacrosse Offensive Player of the Year Award
- Major League Lacrosse Rookie of the Year Award
- Major League Lacrosse Sportsman of the Year Award
- Major League Lacrosse Weekly Awards
- Mann Cup
- McLaughlin Award
- Minto Cup
- National Lacrosse League Defensive Player of the Year Award
- National Lacrosse League Executive of the Year Award
- National Lacrosse League GM of the Year Award
- National Lacrosse League Goaltender of the Year Award
- National Lacrosse League Monthly Awards
- National Lacrosse League MVP Award
- National Lacrosse League Rookie of the Year Award
- National Lacrosse League Sportsmanship Award
- National Lacrosse League Weekly Awards
- Presidents Cup
- Schmeisser Award
- Steinfeld Cup
- Tewaaraton Trophy
- Tom Borrelli Award

== Olympic medalists ==
- Alpine skiing
- Archery
- Athletics: men and women
- Badminton
- Baseball
- Basketball
- Biathlon
- Bobsleigh
- Boxing
- Canoeing: men and women
- Cross-country skiing
- Curling
- Cycling: men and women
- Diving
- Equestrian
- Fencing: men and women
- Field hockey
- Figure skating
- Football
- Freestyle skiing
- Gymnastics: men and women
- Handball: men and women
- Ice hockey
- Judo
- Luge
- Modern pentathlon
- Nordic combined
- Rowing: men and women
- Sailing
- Shooting
- Short track speed skating
- Skeleton
- Ski jumping
- Snowboarding
- Softball
- Speed skating
- Swimming: men and women
- Synchronized swimming
- Table tennis
- Taekwondo
- Tennis
- Triathlon
- Volleyball
- Water polo: men and women
- Weightlifting
- Wrestling: freestyle and Greco-Roman

== Paralympic medalists ==
- Alpine skiing
- Archery
- Athletics
- Boccia
- Dartchery
- Football 5-a-side
- Football 7-a-side
- Rowing
- Shooting
- Swimming
- Table tennis
- Wheelchair curling

== Rugby league ==
- 1989 League Legends Cup – awarded to the winner of the annual match between National Rugby League clubs the Canberra Raiders and the Wests Tigers
- Albert Goldthorpe Medal – award to the Super League player of the year by Rugby Leaguer & League Express magazine
- Auckland Rugby League club trophies – prizes, medals, and awards won by clubs of the Auckland Rugby League
- Clive Churchill Medal – awarded to the annual National Rugby League Grand final's man-of-the-match
- Cronulla-Sutherland Sharks Honours – prizes, medals, and awards of the National Rugby League team Cronulla-Sutherland Sharks
- Dally M Awards – the National Rugby League's official annual awards ceremony
  - Dally M Medal – player of the season
  - List of Dally M Awards winners
- Foley Shield – awarded to the winners of the annual inter-city competition of North Queensland
- Harry Sunderland Trophy – awarded to the annual Super League Grand final's man-of-the-match
- The Immortals – the top six players in Australian history according to Rugby League Week
- J. J. Giltinan Shield – awarded annually to the National Rugby League season's minor premiers
- Jack Gibson Cup – awarded to the winner of the annual match between National Rugby League clubs the Parramatta Eels and Sydney Roosters clubs
- Johnny Mannah Cup – awarded to the winner of the annual match between National Rugby League clubs the Cronulla-Sutherland Sharks and Sydney Roosters clubs
- Lance Todd Trophy – awarded to the annual Challenge Cup Final's man-of-the-match
- League Leader's Shield – awarded annually to Super League's leaders at the end of the regular season
- Mal Meninga Medal – awarded to the Canberra Raiders player of the year
- Man of Steel Awards – awarded annually to the Super League player of the year
- RLIF Awards – the Rugby League International Federation's annual awards ceremony
- Ron Coote Cup – awarded to the winner of the annual match between National Rugby League clubs the South Sydney Rabbitohs and Sydney Roosters clubs
- Rothmans Medal – awarded annually to the best and fairest player of the New South Wales Rugby League and the Brisbane Rugby League
- Royal Agricultural Society Shield – awarded to the annual winners of the New South Wales Rugby League premiership in its early years
- Charity Shield (NRL) – awarded to the winner of an annual pre-season match between National Rugby League clubs the South Sydney Rabbitohs and St George Illawarra Dragons
- Rugby League World Golden Boot Award – awarded annually to the player of the year according to Rugby League World magazine
- South Sydney Rabbitohs competition honours – prizes, medals, and awards of the National Rugby League team South Sydney Rabbitohs
- Super League Dream Team
- Thacker Shield – awarded annually to the winner of a match between the champion clubs of the Canterbury Rugby League and West Coast Rugby League
- Wally Lewis Medal – awarded annually to the player of the State of Origin series

== Rugby union ==
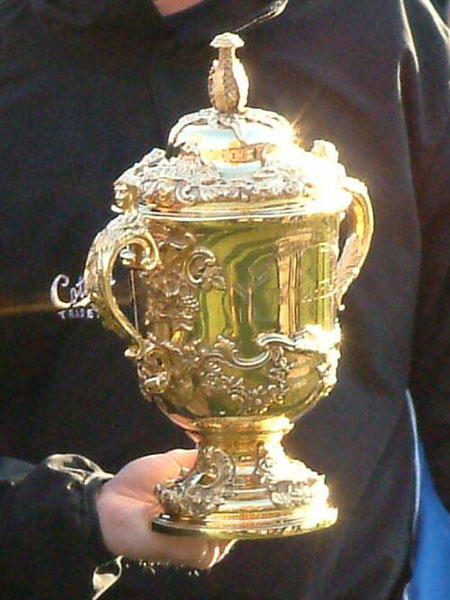
The Webb Ellis Cup

=== Domestic trophies ===
- European:
  - European Rugby Champions Cup – a competition involving leading club, regional, and provincial teams from England, France, Ireland, Italy, Scotland, and Wales
  - European Challenge Cup – the second-tier competition to the European Rugby Champions Cup
  - European Shield – a defunct repechage tournament for teams knocked out in the first round of the European Challenge Cup (no longer awarded)
  - Heineken Cup (no longer awarded)
- France:
  - Bouclier de Brennus – to the champions of the Top 14 league
- Great Britain and Ireland:
  - Anglo-Welsh Cup – (aka LV Cup, a cup competition for English and Welsh top-level club teams)
  - British and Irish Cup – a cup competition for British and Irish semi-pro club teams
- New Zealand:
  - ITM Cup – New Zealand's annual professional domestic competition
  - Meads Cup – a cup played for between provincial teams during the Heartland Championship, the second-tier domestic league
  - Lochore Cup – the secondary trophy in the Heartland Championship
  - Ranfurly Shield – a trophy between provincial teams
- South Africa:
  - Currie Cup – South Africa's premier domestic competition
- Southern Hemisphere:
  - Super Rugby Trophy – to the winners of the Super Rugby competition

=== International two-team challenge trophies ===
- Contested in the Six Nations:
  - Calcutta Cup – England and Scotland
  - Centenary Quaich – Ireland and Scotland
  - Giuseppe Garibaldi Trophy – France and Italy
  - Millennium Trophy – England and Ireland
- Contested in the Tri Nations:
  - Bledisloe Cup – Australia and New Zealand, also contested once a year outside the Tri Nations
  - Freedom Cup – New Zealand and South Africa
  - Mandela Challenge Plate – Australia and South Africa
- Other trophies:
  - Antim Cup – Georgia and Romania
  - Ella–Mobbs Trophy – Australia and England
  - Dave Gallaher Trophy – France and New Zealand
  - Elgon Cup – Kenya and Uganda
  - Hillary Shield – England and New Zealand
  - Hopetoun Cup – Australia and Scotland
  - James Bevan Trophy – Australia and Wales
  - Lansdowne Cup – Australia and Ireland
  - Prince William Cup – South Africa and Wales
  - Puma Trophy – Argentina and Australia
  - Tom Richards Trophy – Australia and the British and Irish Lions
  - Trophée des Bicentenaires – Australia and France

=== IRB Awards ===
IRB Awards (includes two awards given by the International Rugby Players' Association as part of the awards program):

- IRB Development Award
- IRB International Coach of the Year
- IRB International Player of the Year
- IRB International Sevens Player of the Year
- IRB International Team of the Year
- IRB International Women's Personality of the Year
- IRB Junior Player of the Year
- IRB Referee Award for Distinguished Service
- IRB Spirit of Rugby Award
- IRPA Special Merit Award
- IRPA Try of the Year
- Melrose Cup – to the winners of the Rugby World Cup Sevens
- Webb Ellis Cup – to the winners of the Rugby World Cup

== Sailing ==
- Awards:
  - ISAF World Sailor of the Year
- Trophies:
  - America's Cup
  - Sailing World Cup
  - Volvo ocean race

== Tennis ==
- Grand Slam trophies:
  - Australian Open
  - French Open
  - US Open
  - Wimbledon
- World championship trophies:
  - Davis Cup
  - Fed Cup
  - Hopman Cup

== Water polo ==
- Montenegrin Water Polo Cup, national water polo cup played in Montenegro
- Greek Water Polo Cup
- Croatian Water Polo Cup
- Asian Water Polo Cup
- Serbian Water Polo Cup
- FINA Water Polo World Cup of the Fédération Internationale de Natation

== Other sports ==
- Ashburton Shield; rifle shooting (National Rifle Association (United Kingdom))
- Biathlon World Championships
- Billiard Congress of America Hall of Fame
- Boston Marathon
- Callahan Award
- Commonwealth Games
- Elcho Shield; rifle shooting (National Rifle Association (United Kingdom))
- ESPY Award
- FIS Alpine Ski World Cup
- Golden Goggle Awards; swimming
- Harmsworth Trophy; powerboating
- Leech Cup; long range shooting (National Rifle Association of America)
- Mug Cup; river racing
- NOGI Awards; underwater diving
- Pickleball Hall of Fame
- Slammy Award
- Waterloo Cup; coursing
- Wimbledon Cup; long range shooting (National Rifle Association of America)
- World MMA Awards

== See also ==
- List of sports awards honoring women
- List of sumo trophies
