= Champion =

Victor in a challenge, contest or competition

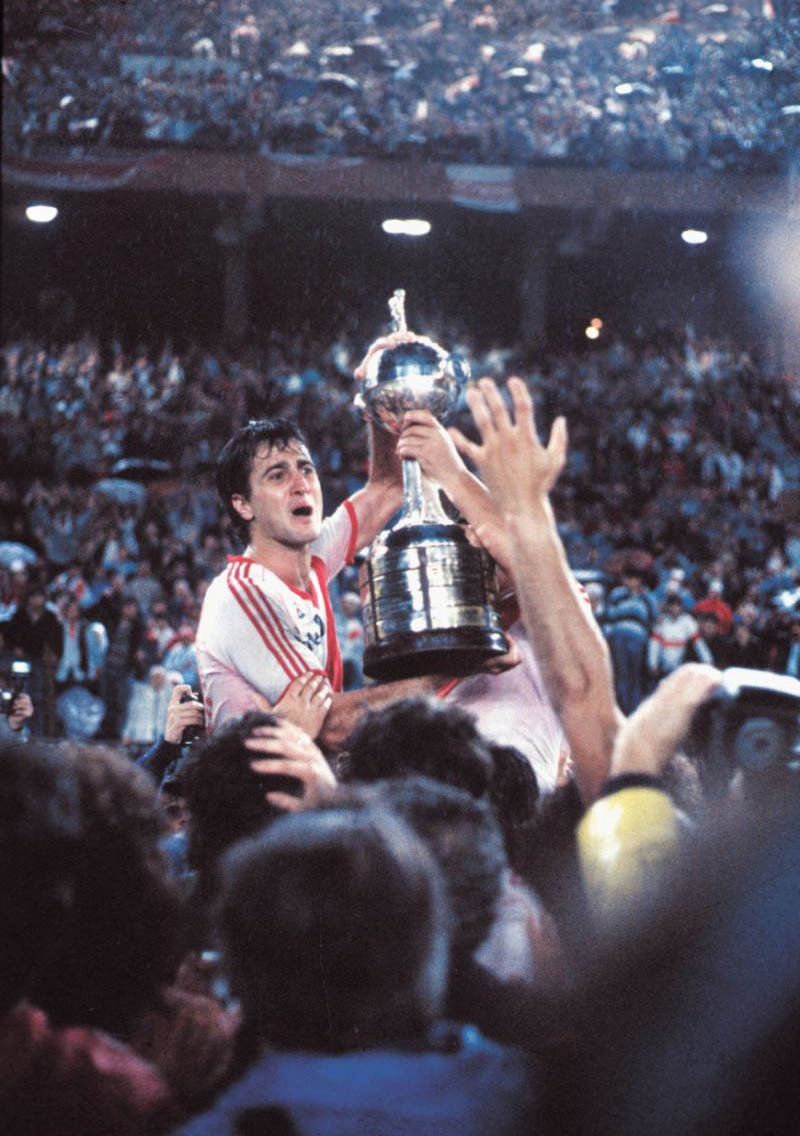
Argentine footballer Norberto Alonso lifts the Copa Libertadores trophy after being champion of the competition with River Plate.

"cempa" or "cempan" stood for 'warrior' in the ancient Anglo-Saxon texts.

A champion is the victor in a challenge, contest or competition. There can be a territorial pyramid of championships, e.g. local, regional/provincial/state, national, continental and world championships, and even further (artificial) divisions at one or more of these levels, as in association football. Their champions can be accordingly styled, e.g. national champion, world champion.

== Meaning ==
In certain disciplines, there are specific titles for champions, either descriptive, as the baspehlivan in Turkish oil wrestling, yokozuna in Japanese sumo wrestling; or copied from social hierarchies, such as the koning and keizer ('king' and 'emperor') in traditional archery competitions (not just national, also at lower levels) in the Low Countries.

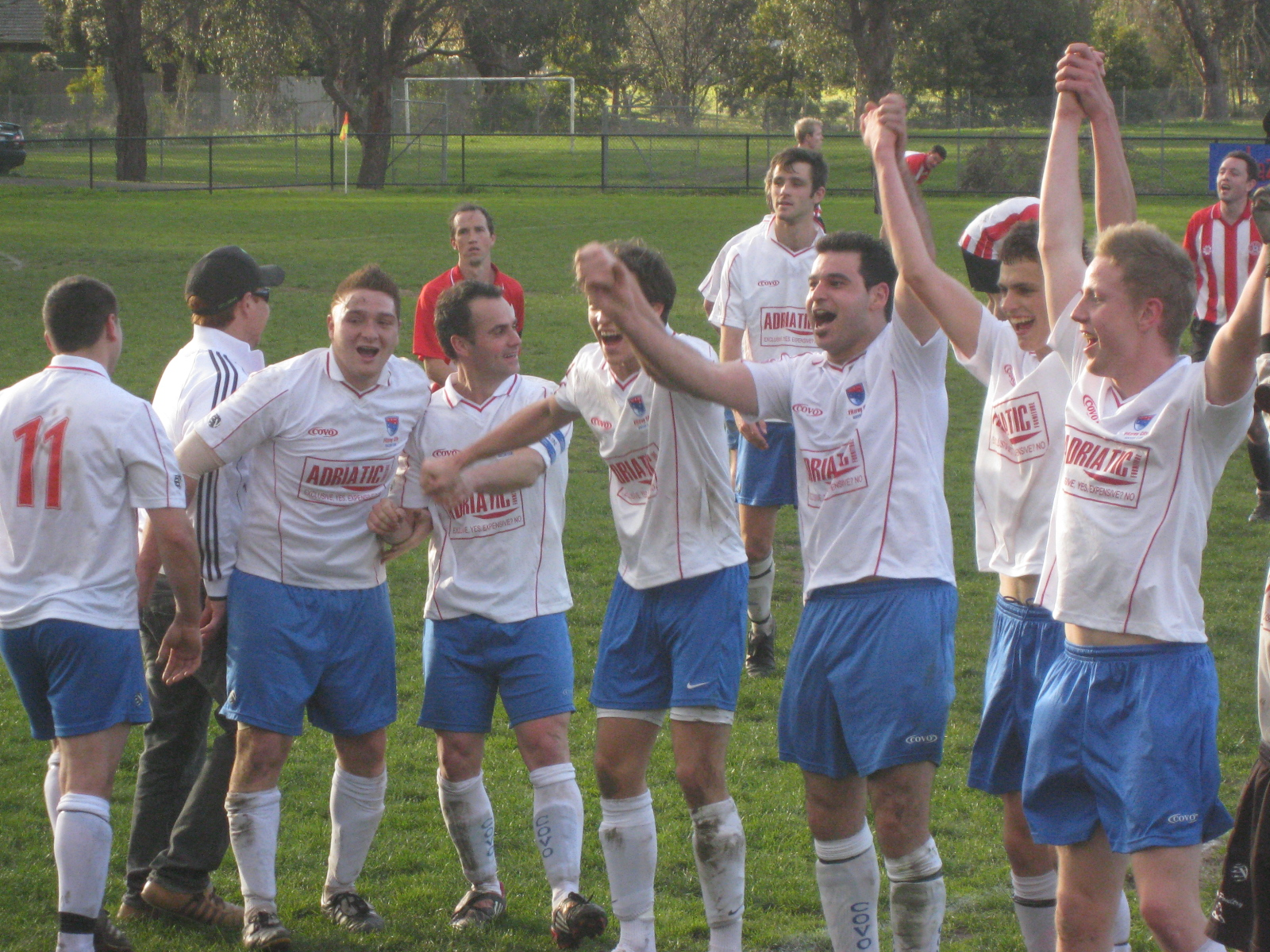
Final Day of the 2009 season, Fitzroy celebrate their first championship in nine years.

- In a broader sense, nearly any sort of competition can be considered a championship, and the winner of it a champion. Thus, there are championships for many non-sporting competitions such as spelling bees or wargames. In this context, it is used as a noun.
- It is also possible to champion a cause. In an ideological sense, encompassing religion, a champion may be an evangelist, a visionary advocate who clears the field for the triumph of the idea. Or the champion may merely make a strong case for a new corporate division to a resistant board of directors. Such a champion may take on responsibility for publicizing the project and garnering funding. But in this case he or she is beyond a simple promoter. The word is thus used as a verb.
- In economic policy, a national champion is a large company that is dominant in its field and favored by the government of the country in which it is based in the belief that it will be in that country's interests if the company is successful in foreign markets. The practice is controversial, and economists mostly don't believe it's beneficial, but it has long been used in France and other countries.
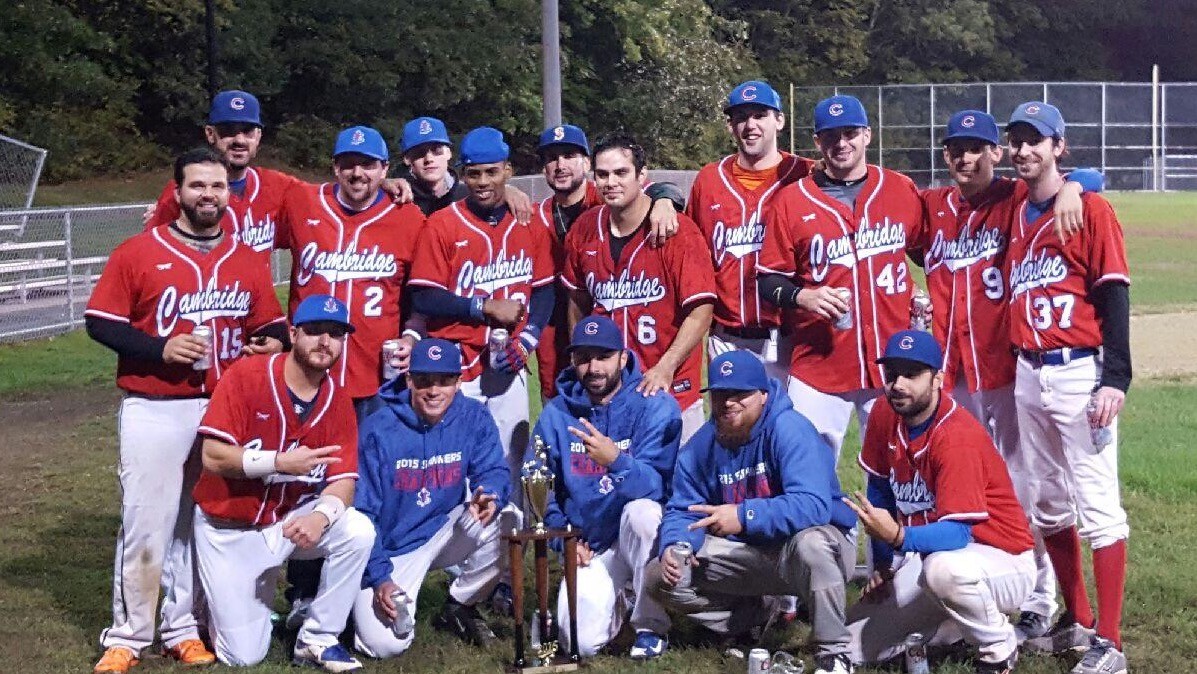
  Cambridge Spinners celebrate their back to back championship in 2016.

The original meaning of the word partakes of both these senses: in the Feudal Era, knights were expected to be champions and paragons of both prowess in combat and of causes, the latter most commonly being either patriotic, romantic or religious in nature (thus becoming models of virtue). This reaches its most literal meaning in a trial by combat, in which each combatant champions the cause of one side of the trial. A "King's Champion" is appointed for ceremonial purposes at the coronation of an English Monarch, to defeat any challenger to the monarch's right to be crowned.

Champion warfare refers to a type of battle, most commonly found in the epic poetry and myth of ancient history, in which the outcome of the conflict is determined by single combat, an individual duel between the best soldiers ("champions") from each opposing army.

== World champion ==
World champion is a title used to denote a winner of a world championship in a particular sport (such as mixed martial arts, professional boxing or professional wrestling), discipline or game. Being a champion at any sport or game requires an extraordinary amount of focus, discipline, drive and complete dedication, usually from a young age. What separates a world champion from the average competitor aside from natural ability and environmental advantages with access to the best training facilities, is the ability to focus on their goal and to become the best of the best, the obsession to continually improve and mental conditioning required to focus on becoming the best in the world at their given subject.
