= NATYCAA Cup =

- Awarded for: The most successful two year college athletic program in each division.
- Presented by: National Alliance of Two Year College Athletic Administrators

History
- Most wins: NJCAA Scholarship Division: Iowa Central Tritons (13); NJCAA Non-Scholarship Division: Rowan Roadrunners (9); State Association Division (CCCAA/NWAC): Mt. San Antonio Mounties (15)
- Most recent: NJCAA Scholarship Division: Iowa Western Reivers; NJCAA Non-Scholarship Division: Rowan Roadrunners; State Association Division (CCCAA/NWAC): Mt. San Antonio Mounties

The NATYCAA Cup, known for sponsorship reasons as the Daktronics Cup, is an award given annually by the National Alliance of Two Year College Athletic Administrators to the junior and community colleges in the United States with the most success in collegiate athletics. The competition was founded in 2003 as the junior college equivalent to the NACDA Directors' Cup. Points for the NATYCAA Cup are based on order of finish in various championships sponsored by the National Junior College Athletic Association and state associations (specifically the California Community College Athletic Association and Northwest Athletic Conference). Three awards are given annually: one to the most successful school in the NJCAA scholarship division, one to the most successful school in the NJCAA non-scholarship division, and one to the most successful school in a state association (combined standings between the CCCAA and NWAC). Since 2011–12, the most successful school between the three divisions is awarded the Two Year College Directors' Cup.

== Past winners ==
Teams in bold indicate winners of the Two Year College Directors' Cup for that season.

=== NJCAA Scholarship Division ===
| Year | Winner |
|---|---|
| 2003–04 | DuPage (IL) |
| 2004–05 | Mesa (AZ) |
| 2005–06 | Monroe (NY) |
| 2006–07 | Monroe (NY) |
| 2007–08 | Johnson (KS) |
| 2008–09 | Iowa Central |
| 2009–10 | Iowa Central |
| 2010–11 | Iowa Central |
| 2011–12 | Iowa Central |
| 2012–13 | Iowa Central |
| 2013–14 | **Iowa Western** |
| 2014–15 | Iowa Central |
| 2015–16 | **Iowa Central** |
| 2016–17 | **Iowa Central** |
| 2017–18 | **Iowa Central** |
| 2018–19 | **Iowa Central** |
| 2019–20 | Iowa Central |
| 2020–21 | **Iowa Central** |
| 2021–22 | **Iowa Western** |
| 2022–23 | Iowa Western |
| 2023–24 | Iowa Western |
| 2024–25 | Iowa Western |
| 2025–26 | Iowa Western |

=== NJCCA Non-Scholarship Division ===
| Year | Winner |
|---|---|
| 2003–04 | Mohawk Valley (NY) |
| 2004–05 | DuPage (IL) |
| 2005–06 | DuPage (IL) |
| 2006–07 | DuPage (IL) |
| 2007–08 | DuPage (IL) |
| 2008–09 | DuPage (IL) |
| 2009–10 | Gloucester (NJ) (Note: Now known as Rowan College) |
| 2010–11 | Gloucester (NJ) |
| 2011–12 | Gloucester (NJ) |
| 2012–13 | **Gloucester (NJ)** |
| 2013–14 | Herkimer (NY) |
| 2014–15 | Herkimer (NY) |
| 2015–16 | Suffolk (NY) |
| 2016–17 | Herkimer (NY) |
| 2017–18 | Rowan (NJ) (Note: Previously Gloucester County College) |
| 2018–19 | Suffolk (NY) |
| 2019–20 | Herkimer (NY) |
| 2020–21 | DuPage (IL) |
| 2021–22 | Rowan (NJ) |
| 2022–23 | **DuPage (IL)** |
| 2023–24 | **Rowan (NJ)** |
| 2024–25 | Rowan (NJ) |
| 2025–26 | Rowan (NJ) |

=== State Association Division ===
| Year | Winner |
|---|---|
| 2003–04 | Sierra (CA) |
| 2004–05 | Fresno (CA) |
| 2005–06 | Long Beach (CA) |
| 2006–07 | Orange Coast (CA) |
| 2007–08 | Fresno (CA) |
| 2008–09 | Mt. San Antonio (CA) |
| 2009–10 | Orange Coast (CA) |
| 2010–11 | Mt. San Antonio (CA) |
| 2011–12 | **Fresno (CA)** |
| 2012–13 | Mt. San Antonio (CA) |
| 2013–14 | Mt. San Antonio (CA) |
| 2014–15 | **Mt. San Antonio (CA)** |
| 2015–16 | Mt. San Antonio (CA) |
| 2016–17 | Mt. San Antonio (CA) |
| 2017–18 | Mt. San Antonio (CA) |
| 2018–19 | Mt. San Antonio (CA) |
| 2019–20 | Mt. San Antonio (CA) |
| 2020–21 | Not awarded due to COVID-19 |
| 2021–22 | Mt. San Antonio (CA) |
| 2022–23 | Mt. San Antonio (CA) |
| 2023–24 | Mt. San Antonio (CA) |
| 2024–25 | **Mt. San Antonio (CA)** |
| 2025–26 | **Mt. San Antonio (CA)** |

== See also ==
- NACDA Directors' Cup
- Capital One Cup
- List of sport awards
