= Tapdog =

Australian-bred Thoroughbred racehorse

- Sire: Bletcharm
- Grandsire: Bletchingly
- Dam: Starjazz
- Damsire: Dancing Dissident
- Sex: Gelding
- Foaled: 9 October 1997
- Country: Australia
- Colour: Brown
- Breeder: Doomland Pty Ltd
- Owner: Peter Harding Day, Hans Hoiskar, and Peter Robert Day
- Trainer: Clive Lauritsen
- Record: 59: 16-8-7

Major wins
- Geraldton Gold Cup (2002, 2006, 2007)

Tapdog is an Australian Thoroughbred racehorse who became the first horse to win the unlisted Geraldton Gold Cup three times.

He is a brown gelding that was foaled on 9 October 1997. Tapdog was bred in New South Wales by Doomland Pty Ltd. He is by Bletcharm and his dam Starjazz (Ireland) was by Dancing Dissident (USA). He was sold at the 1999 yearling sale in Scone, New South Wales. His owners are Peter H. Day, Hans J. Hoiskar, and Peter R. Day. He was trained by Clive Lauritsen in Geraldton, Western Australia.

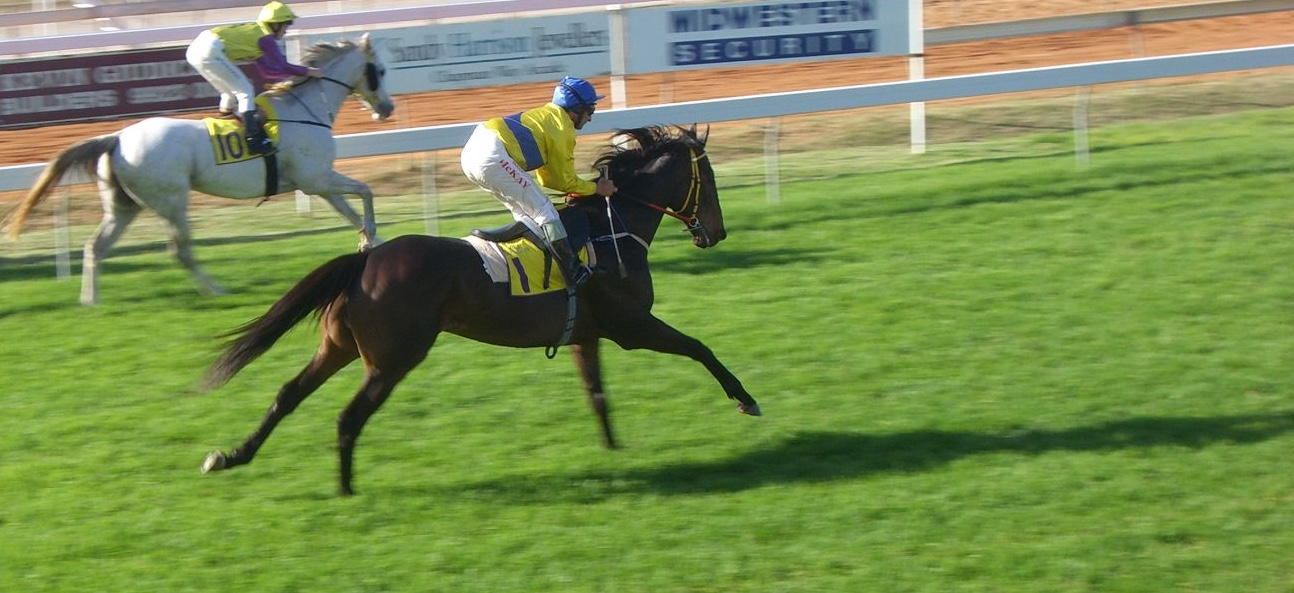
Tapdog heading to the barriers with Roy McKay in the saddle

== Cup and trophy races ==
- 2007 XXXX Geraldton Gold Cup, over 2,100 metres at Geraldton. The first horse in history to win the race three times.
- 2006 Australia Day Cup, over 2,200 m at Ascot Racecourse, Western Australia.
- 2006 XXXX Geraldton Gold Cup, over 2,100 m at Geraldton. Equal race record time.
- 2005 Landmark Christmas Cup, over 1,800 m at Geraldton.
- 2004 Gascoyne Hotel-Exmouth Cup.
- 2003 Supa Valu Kalbarri Cup, over 1,400 m at Geraldton.
- 2002 Perak Turf Club Trophy, over 2,200 m at Ascot.
- 2002 Geraldton Swan Draught Gold Cup, over 2,100 m at Geraldton.

Tapdog's last start was in April 2008, when his record stood at 59 starts for 16 wins, 8 seconds and 7 thirds with earnings of A$225,427.
