= NACDA Directors' Cup =

Athletics award for collegiate teams

- Awarded for: The most successful overall athletic program in each division of collegiate sports.
- Presented by: National Association of Collegiate Directors of Athletics

History
- Most wins: NCAA Division I: Stanford Cardinal (26); NCAA Division II: Grand Valley State Lakers (18); NCAA Division III: Williams Ephs (22); NAIA: Azusa Pacific Cougars (8); NJCAA: Iowa Central Tritons (5)
- Most recent: NCAA Division I: Texas Longhorns; NCAA Division II: Grand Valley State Lakers; NCAA Division III: Washington University Bears; NAIA: Cumberlands Patriots; NJCAA: Iowa Western Reivers
- Website: https://thedirectorscup.com/

The NACDA Directors' Cup, known for sponsorship reasons as the NACDA Learfield Directors' Cup or simply as the Directors' Cup, is an award given annually by the National Association of Collegiate Directors of Athletics (NACDA) to the colleges and universities in the United States (Note: The three Canadian universities which compete in the NCAA or NAIA, including Simon Fraser University, University of British Columbia, and University of Victoria, are also eligible for the award.) with the most success in collegiate athletics. Points for the NACDA Directors' Cup are based on order of finish in various championships sponsored by the National Collegiate Athletic Association (NCAA) and the National Association of Intercollegiate Athletics (NAIA) or, in the case of Division I Football, media-based polls. A first-place finish in a sport earns 100 points, second place 90 points, third place 85 points, fourth place 80 points, and lesser values for lower finishes (exact numbers beyond fourth place depend on the sport and division).

The award originated in 1993 and was presented to NCAA Division I schools only. In 1995, it was extended to Division II, Division III, and NAIA schools as well, then extended further to junior colleges in 2011 based on standings from the NATYCAA Cup. Each division receives its own award.

The physical award is a Waterford Crystal trophy. Prior to 2003, the sponsor of the NACDA Directors' Cup was retail merchandiser Sears, and the award was known as the Sears Cup. Beginning in the 2003–04 season, the sponsor was the United States Sports Academy. In 2007–08, Learfield Sports assumed the sponsorship of the Directors' Cup. Learfield Sports rebranded to Learfield IMG College in 2016 and to simply Learfield in 2021.

== History ==
The University of North Carolina at Chapel Hill won the award in its inaugural year, but then Stanford University won the Division I award for 25 straight years until the streak was broken in 2020–21 by the University of Texas. Texas repeated in 2022, Stanford regained the cup in 2023, and Texas won again in 2024 and 2025.

In Division II, UC Davis won six of the first eight awards, but its athletic program moved to Division I in 2003 and Grand Valley State has won 17 of the 20 awards since as of 2025 (the title went unawarded for two years due to COVID-19). The only other current Division II member with an award is 1999 winner Adams State. All other Division II winners (Bakersfield, California Baptist, and Grand Canyon) are now members of Division I.

Williams College has had by far the most success in Division III, having won the Cup 22 of the 28 times it has been awarded for that division. The only other D-III member with more than one Cup is 2023 and 2024 winner Johns Hopkins.

The NAIA division was dominated by Simon Fraser University of British Columbia in its early years, but in 2002, SFU transferred most of its sports programs to Canada's college athletics federation, then known as Canadian Interuniversity Sport and now as U Sports. SFU left U Sports in 2011 and has since become a full member of NCAA Division II. From 2004–05 to 2011–12, Azusa Pacific University assumed the mantle at the NAIA level, winning eight consecutive championships before moving to NCAA Division II in the 2012–13 season. Oklahoma City University has been the most successful school since that year, with three Directors' Cups in the 2010s and four overall.

For two-year colleges, Iowa Central Community College has been the most successful school, winning five of the 10 titles.

== Scoring system ==
- NCAA Division I: Counts top 19 sports at each school with the following breakdowns:
  - Five of which must be baseball, men's basketball, women's basketball, women's soccer and women's volleyball
  - The next highest 14 sports scored for each institution, regardless of gender, will be used in the standings (except men's water polo) (Note: Men's water polo is the only sport with an NCAA championship for which NACDA does not award any points.)
  - For FBS Football: the top 25 teams are awarded points based on their final rank in the Coaches Poll. 26th place is considered a tie between every non-ranked bowl winner, and the next available rank is considered a tie between every non-ranked bowl loser.
- NCAA Division II: Counts top 15 sports at each school with the following breakdowns:
  - Four of which must be baseball, men's basketball, women's basketball and women's volleyball
  - The next highest 11 sports scored for each institution, regardless of gender, will be used in the standings (except men's water polo)
- NCAA Division III: Counts top 18 sports at each school with the following breakdowns:
  - Four of which must be men's basketball, men's soccer, women's basketball and women's soccer
  - The next highest 14 sports scored for each institution, regardless of gender, will be used in the standings (except men's water polo)
- NAIA: Counts top 13 sports at each school with the following breakdowns:
  - Four of which must be men's basketball, men's soccer, women's basketball and women's volleyball
  - The next highest 9 sports scored for each institution, regardless of gender, will be used in the standings
- Junior/Community Colleges: The highest scoring institution in the NATYCAA Cup standings among the NJCAA Scholarship, NJCAA Non-Scholarship, and State Associations divisions will be declared the Directors' Cup winner.

=== Tiebreaking ===
If two teams have the same number of points at the end of the season, the tiebreaker is the number of national championships won. If still tied the next tiebreaker is the number of second-place finishes, then third-place finishes and so on until one team wins. The tiebreaker is only used for first place.

=== Criticism ===
The scoring structure has been criticized for several reasons, especially due to the number of sports counted per division. Although the number of sports counted in the scoring is based on the average number of sports sponsored by a team in that division, certain schools offer many more or many fewer sports than that. For example, Stanford's dominance at the Division I level is partially attributable to them sponsoring 36 sports teams (of which 31 are NCAA sports), the most in Division I outside of the Ivy League, which does not grant athletic scholarships, and Ohio State, which sponsors 37 sports teams (of which 32 are NCAA sports). This gives Stanford more opportunities to win titles than most other schools, especially considering that some of the sports Stanford sponsors are not played by very many other schools (5 out of 31 have championship fields under 20 teams, and one [namely men's gymnastics] has fewer than 20 sponsoring schools), all but guaranteeing a substantial number of points for the few schools that do (NACDA awards significantly fewer points for teams that finish lower than fourth in sports with less competition, but the top four teams (except in 8-team and 4-team bracket sports) always receive 100, 90, 85, and 80 points respectively). Ohio State, which sponsors teams in more NCAA sports than Stanford (5 of which, like Stanford, have championship fields under 20 teams) has never won the Cup (Ohio State has finished second 3 times, third twice, fourth 3 times, and in the top ten 7 more times).

Another common criticism is the fact that four sports are required to be counted despite some schools not sponsoring those sports. While every Division I school sponsors men's basketball, and all but two (The Citadel and VMI) sponsor women's basketball, a significant number of D-I schools do not sponsor the other two "mandatory counters" of baseball and women's volleyball. In the 2023–24 school year, 21 schools did not sponsor women's volleyball and 53 did not sponsor baseball, giving those schools an inherent disadvantage as they must count a sport for which they are guaranteed to receive no points.

Other reasons for criticism are over the way NACDA awards points in "National Collegiate" sports, which are sports where Division I, II, and III schools all compete directly against each other instead of being separated. The NCAA considers National Collegiate championships equivalent to Division I, therefore Division III schools are allowed to grant athletic scholarships in those sports, but NACDA counts points earned in National Collegiate competitions toward whatever division a team primarily competes in. Similarly, several otherwise Division III schools compete in Division I for men's ice hockey (despite Division III having its own ice hockey tournament), so there have been instances where two different Division III teams earn 100 points in the sport.

Multiple suggestions have been made to change the scoring system. Some of the most popular of these include making each sport worth a proportional number of points to the number of schools that compete in it, to get rid of the limit on the number of sports counted, then divide a school's total points by the number of sports it sponsors, and to count the median number of teams per division instead of the average (the median number of teams at a Division I school, for example, is 16, which is substantially lower than the 19 sports that are currently counted). However, NACDA has never seriously considered any of these suggestions.

=== Past scoring system ===
From the creation of the award until the 2017–18 season the scoring was as follows:

- NCAA Division I: Counted up to 20 total sports at each school, with a maximum of 10 sports counted for each gender
- NCAA Division II: Counted up to 14 total sports at each school, with a maximum of 7 sports counted for each gender
- NCAA Division III: Counted up to 18 total sports at each school, with a maximum of 9 sports counted for each gender
- NAIA: Counted up to 12 total sports at each school, with a maximum of 6 sports counted for each gender
- Junior/Community Colleges: Same as current

== Past winners ==
- Results for years and schools shown in italics represent current standings and are not yet final.
- These results are for the "final" standings, calculated after spring sports end.

=== NCAA Division I ===
Year	First	Second	Third	Fourth	Fifth	Sixth	Seventh	Eighth	Ninth	Tenth
1993–94	North Carolina	Stanford	UCLA	Florida	Penn State	Arizona	Texas	USC	Michigan	Arizona State
1994–95	Stanford	North Carolina	UCLA	Arizona	Florida	USC	Michigan	Penn State	Nebraska	Texas
1995–96	Stanford	UCLA	Florida	Texas	Michigan	North Carolina	Arizona	Nebraska	Penn State	USC
1996–97	Stanford	North Carolina	UCLA	Nebraska	Florida	Arizona	Texas	Ohio State	USC	LSU
1997–98	Stanford	(tie) Florida, North Carolina		UCLA	Michigan	Arizona	Georgia	Washington	Nebraska	LSU
1998–99	Stanford	Georgia	Penn State	Florida	UCLA	Michigan	Duke	Virginia	(tie) Arizona, USC	
1999–2000	Stanford	UCLA	Michigan	Penn State	North Carolina	Nebraska	Florida	Arizona	Texas	LSU
2000–01	Stanford	UCLA	Georgia	Michigan	Arizona	Ohio State	Florida	USC	Arizona State	Penn State
2001–02	Stanford	Texas	Florida	North Carolina	UCLA	Michigan	Minnesota	Georgia	Arizona	LSU
2002–03	Stanford	Texas	Ohio State	Michigan	Penn State	UCLA	Florida	North Carolina	California	Arizona State
2003–04	Stanford	Michigan	UCLA	Ohio State	Georgia	Florida	North Carolina	Washington	California	Texas
2004–05	Stanford	Texas	UCLA	Michigan	Duke	Florida	Georgia	Tennessee	North Carolina	USC
2005–06	Stanford	UCLA	Texas	North Carolina	Florida	Notre Dame	California	Duke	Georgia	USC
2006–07	Stanford	UCLA	North Carolina	Michigan	USC	Florida	Tennessee	Texas	California	Arizona State
2007–08	Stanford	UCLA	Michigan	Arizona State	Texas	Florida	California	LSU	Penn State	Georgia
2008–09	Stanford	North Carolina	Florida	USC	Michigan	Texas	California	Virginia	LSU	Ohio State
2009–10	Stanford	Florida	Virginia	UCLA	Florida State	Texas A&M	North Carolina	Ohio State	California	Duke
2010–11	Stanford	Ohio State	California	Florida	Duke	North Carolina	Virginia	Texas A&M	Florida State	Oklahoma
2011–12	Stanford	Florida	UCLA	Ohio State	Florida State	Texas	USC	North Carolina	Texas A&M	Michigan
2012–13	Stanford	Florida	UCLA	Michigan	Texas A&M	Penn State	Oklahoma	North Carolina	Notre Dame	Georgia
2013–14	Stanford	Florida	Notre Dame	Virginia	Penn State	Texas	UCLA	USC	Duke	Texas A&M
2014–15	Stanford	UCLA	USC	Florida	North Carolina	Virginia	Ohio State	Penn State	Texas	Notre Dame
2015–16	Stanford	Ohio State	Michigan	USC	Florida	UCLA	North Carolina	Virginia	Texas	Oregon
2016–17	Stanford	Ohio State	Florida	USC	North Carolina	Michigan	Texas	Penn State	Oregon	Kentucky
2017–18	Stanford	UCLA	Florida	USC	Texas	Michigan	Ohio State	Georgia	Florida State	Texas A&M
2018–19	Stanford	Michigan	Florida	Texas	USC	UCLA	Florida State	Virginia	Duke	North Carolina
2019–20	Not awarded because of the COVID-19 pandemic (Note: At the time of the competition being canceled the top 10 was as follows: Stanford, Michigan, Washington, Wisconsin, BYU, Virginia, Penn State, Louisville, Notre Dame, North Carolina)									
2020–21	Texas	Stanford	Michigan	North Carolina	Florida	USC	Alabama	Arkansas	Ohio State	Georgia
2021–22	Texas	Stanford	Michigan	Ohio State	Florida	North Carolina	Arkansas	Notre Dame	Kentucky	Oklahoma
2022–23	Stanford	Texas	Ohio State	Virginia	Florida	Tennessee	Georgia	North Carolina	LSU	USC
2023–24	Texas	Stanford	Tennessee	Florida	Virginia	Texas A&M	North Carolina	Michigan	Alabama	UCLA
2024–25	Texas	USC	Stanford	North Carolina	UCLA	Tennessee	Florida	Ohio State	Oklahoma	Duke
2025–26	Texas	Stanford	UCLA	North Carolina	Virginia	Florida	USC	Georgia	Michigan	Ohio State

University	Cup wins	Top Ten Rankings
Stanford	26	32
Texas	5	27
North Carolina	1	26
Florida		32
UCLA		25
Michigan		24
USC		21
Ohio State		16
Georgia		13
Penn State		12
Virginia		11
Duke		8
California		8
Arizona		8

Stanford and Florida are the only schools to finish within the top 10 every season. Stanford has never finished below third.

=== NCAA Division II ===
Year	First	Second	Third	Fourth	Fifth
1995–96	UC Davis	Abilene Christian	North Dakota State	South Dakota State	Cal State Bakersfield
1996–97	UC Davis	Abilene Christian	Cal State Bakersfield	Central Oklahoma	Indianapolis
1997–98	Cal State Bakersfield	UC Davis	Abilene Christian	Barry	Florida Southern
1998–99	Adams State	(tie) UC Davis; Abilene Christian		(tie) Florida Southern; North Dakota State	
1999–2000	UC Davis	North Dakota State	North Dakota	Florida Southern	Western Colorado
2000–01	UC Davis	North Dakota	Cal State Bakersfield	UC San Diego	Western Colorado
2001–02	UC Davis	Grand Valley State	UC San Diego	Truman State	Western Colorado
2002–03	UC Davis	Grand Valley State	North Florida	Cal State Bakersfield	South Dakota State
2003–04	Grand Valley State	UC San Diego	Truman State	North Dakota	Chico State
2004–05	Grand Valley State	Nebraska–Omaha	Chico State	North Dakota	Cal State Bakersfield
2005–06	Grand Valley State	Abilene Christian	Nebraska–Omaha	Southern Illinois Edwardsville	Cal State Bakersfield
2006–07	Grand Valley State	UC San Diego	Abilene Christian	Minnesota State Mankato	North Dakota
2007–08	Grand Valley State	Abilene Christian	Minnesota State Mankato	UC San Diego	Tampa
2008–09	Grand Valley State	Minnesota State Mankato	Central Missouri	Abilene Christian	Indianapolis
2009–10	Grand Valley State	California (PA)	Central Missouri	Minnesota State Mankato	St. Cloud State
2010–11	Grand Valley State	Central Missouri	Augustana (SD)	Abilene Christian	UC San Diego
2011–12	Grand Canyon	Grand Valley State	Ashland	Augustana (SD)	Indianapolis
2012–13	Grand Canyon	Grand Valley State	Ashland	Minnesota State Mankato	Adams State
2013–14	Grand Valley State	West Texas A&M	Central Missouri	Indianapolis	Ashland
2014–15	Grand Valley State	Ashland	Central Missouri	Lewis (IL)	Minnesota State
2015–16	Grand Valley State	Saint Leo (FL)	UC San Diego	California Baptist	Minnesota State
2016–17	Grand Valley State	California Baptist	West Florida	UC San Diego	Queens (NC)
2017–18	California Baptist	Grand Valley State	West Texas A&M	Saint Leo (FL)	Florida Southern
2018–19	Grand Valley State	UC San Diego	West Texas A&M	Queens (NC)	Indianapolis
2019–20	Not awarded because of the COVID-19 pandemic (Note: At the time of the 2020 competition being canceled the top 5 was as follows: Colorado Mines, Western Washington, Grand Valley State, Wingate, West Chester (PA))				
2020–21	Not awarded because of the COVID-19 pandemic				
2021–22	Grand Valley State	West Texas A&M	Indianapolis	Queens (NC)	Azusa Pacific
2022–23	Grand Valley State	West Texas A&M	Colorado Mines	Indianapolis	Wingate
2023–24	Grand Valley State	Indianapolis	West Texas A&M	Wingate	Tampa
2024–25	Grand Valley State	Wingate	West Texas A&M	Indianapolis	Tampa
2025–26	Grand Valley State	Wingate	Indianapolis	West Texas A&M	Minnesota State

Schools in italics no longer compete in Division II.

University	Cup wins
Grand Valley State	18
UC Davis	6
Grand Canyon	2
Adams State	1
Cal State Bakersfield	1
California Baptist	1

=== NCAA Division III ===
Year	First	Second	Third	Fourth	Fifth
1995–96	Williams	UC San Diego	Wisconsin–Oshkosh	College of New Jersey	Rowan
1996–97	Williams	College of New Jersey	UC San Diego	Emory	Wisconsin–Oshkosh
1997–98	UC San Diego	(tie) College of New Jersey; Cortland State		(tie) Williams; Middlebury	
1998–99	Williams	Middlebury	College of New Jersey	Amherst	Rowan
1999–2000	Williams	UC San Diego	College of New Jersey	St. Thomas (MN)	Middlebury
2000–01	Williams	Middlebury	College of New Jersey	Emory	Ithaca
2001–02	Williams	Ithaca	College of New Jersey	Middlebury	Emory
2002–03	Williams	Emory	College of New Jersey	Trinity (TX)	Washington (MO)
2003–04	Williams	Emory	Middlebury	College of New Jersey	Wisconsin–Stevens Point
2004–05	Williams	Middlebury	Washington (MO)	Trinity (TX)	Wisconsin–Stevens Point
2005–06	Williams	College of New Jersey	Middlebury	Emory	Cortland State
2006–07	Williams	Middlebury	Cortland State	Amherst	Washington (MO)
2007–08	Williams	Washington (MO)	College of New Jersey	Amherst	Middlebury
2008–09	Williams	Middlebury	Amherst	Washington (MO)	Cortland State
2009–10	Williams	Amherst	Washington (MO)	Middlebury	Illinois Wesleyan
2010–11	Williams	Middlebury	Washington (MO)	Amherst	Calvin
2011–12	Middlebury	Washington (MO)	Williams	Amherst	Wisconsin–Whitewater
2012–13	Williams	Emory	Middlebury	Wisconsin–Whitewater	Washington (MO)
2013–14	Williams	Wisconsin–Whitewater	Johns Hopkins	Washington (MO)	Amherst
2014–15	Williams	Johns Hopkins	MIT	Washington (MO)	Amherst
2015–16	Williams	Washington (MO)	Emory	Tufts	Middlebury
2016–17	Williams	Washington (MO)	Tufts	Claremont-Mudd-Scripps	Johns Hopkins
2017–18	Williams	MIT	Claremont-Mudd-Scripps	Emory	Middlebury
2018–19	Williams	Johns Hopkins	Washington (MO)	Middlebury	Emory
2019–20	Not awarded because of the COVID-19 pandemic (Note: At the time of the 2020 competition being canceled the top 5 was as follows: Johns Hopkins, Tufts, Chicago, Claremont-Mudd-Scripps, Middlebury)				
2020–21	Not awarded because of the COVID-19 pandemic				
2021–22	Tufts	Johns Hopkins	Middlebury	MIT	Washington (MO)
2022–23	Johns Hopkins	Tufts	Williams	MIT	Emory
2023–24	Johns Hopkins	Williams	Emory	Tufts	NYU
2024–25	Emory	Johns Hopkins	Tufts	Washington (MO)	Middlebury
2025–26	Washington (MO)	Tufts	Johns Hopkins	Emory	Williams

Schools in italics no longer compete in Division III.

University	Cup wins
Williams	22
Johns Hopkins	2
UC San Diego	1
Middlebury	1
Tufts	1
Emory	1
Washington (MO)	1

=== NAIA ===
Year	First	Second	Third	Fourth	Fifth
1995–96	Pacific Lutheran	Simon Fraser	Mobile	Berry	Azusa Pacific
1996–97	Simon Fraser	Pacific Lutheran	Azusa Pacific	Mobile	Willamette
1997–98	Simon Fraser	Mobile	Findlay	Oklahoma City	Puget Sound
1998–99	Simon Fraser	Azusa Pacific	Life	(tie) Oklahoma City; Lindenwood	
1999–2000	Simon Fraser	Lindenwood	Azusa Pacific	Mary	Oklahoma City
2000–01	Simon Fraser	Oklahoma City	Azusa Pacific	Lindenwood	Cumberlands (KY)
2001–02	Oklahoma City	Lindenwood	Simon Fraser	Azusa Pacific	Malone
2002–03	Lindenwood	Simon Fraser	Azusa Pacific	Mary	Oklahoma City
2003–04	Simon Fraser	Azusa Pacific	Lindenwood	Oklahoma City	(tie) Mary; Dickinson State
2004–05	Azusa Pacific	Lindenwood	Simon Fraser	Point Loma Nazarene	Mary
2005–06	Azusa Pacific	Lindenwood	Lindsey Wilson	Oklahoma Baptist	Simon Fraser
2006–07	Azusa Pacific	Lindenwood	Concordia (CA)	Cedarville	Oklahoma Baptist
2007–08	Azusa Pacific	Simon Fraser	Embry–Riddle	Fresno Pacific	Concordia (CA)
2008–09	Azusa Pacific	Concordia (CA)	Lindenwood	Fresno Pacific	California Baptist
2009–10	Azusa Pacific	Simon Fraser	Fresno Pacific	Concordia (CA)	Lindenwood
2010–11	Azusa Pacific	Embry–Riddle	Shorter	Fresno Pacific	Lindenwood
2011–12	Azusa Pacific	Shorter	Embry–Riddle	Oklahoma Baptist	Lindsey Wilson
2012–13	Oklahoma Baptist	Lindsey Wilson	Concordia (CA)	Embry–Riddle (FL)	Olivet Nazarene
2013–14	Grand View	Oklahoma City	Lindsey Wilson	Embry–Riddle	Olivet Nazarene
2014–15	Oklahoma Baptist	Lindsey Wilson	Oklahoma City	Wayland Baptist	Embry–Riddle
2015–16	Lindsey Wilson	Oklahoma Baptist	Wayland Baptist	Olivet Nazarene	Indiana Wesleyan
2016–17	Oklahoma City	Lindsey Wilson	Keiser	Wayland Baptist	William Carey
2017–18	Oklahoma City	Lindsey Wilson	Wayland Baptist	Keiser	Indiana Wesleyan
2018–19	Oklahoma City	William Carey	Lindsey Wilson	Keiser	Indiana Wesleyan
2019–20	Not awarded because of the COVID-19 pandemic (Note: At the time of the competition being canceled the top 5 was as follows: Lindsey Wilson, Indiana Wesleyan, Eastern Oregon, Grand View, Cumberlands (KY))				
2020–21	Keiser	Indiana Tech	Indiana Wesleyan	Oklahoma City	Marian (IN)
2021–22	Indiana Wesleyan	Keiser	Grand View	Indiana Tech	Southeastern (FL)
2022–23	Indiana Tech	Marian (IN)	Keiser	Indiana Wesleyan	Southeastern (FL)
2023–24	Cumberlands	Indiana Wesleyan	Keiser	Marian	William Carey
2024–25	Cumberlands	Keiser	Indiana Wesleyan	Marian	William Carey
2025–26	Cumberlands	Indiana Wesleyan	Keiser	Marian	Lindsey Wilson

Schools in italics no longer compete in the NAIA.

University	Cup wins
Azusa Pacific	8
Simon Fraser	6
Oklahoma City	4
Cumberlands	3
Oklahoma Baptist	2
Grand View	1
Indiana Tech	1
Indiana Wesleyan	1
Keiser	1
Lindenwood	1
Lindsey Wilson	1
Pacific Lutheran	1

=== Two-year colleges ===
Year	First	Second	Third	Fourth	Fifth
2011–12	Fresno (CA)	Mt. San Antonio (CA)	Orange Coast (CA)	Iowa Central	Santa Rosa (CA)
2012–13	Gloucester (NJ) (Note: Now known as Rowan College)	Iowa Central	Mt. San Antonio (CA)	Monroe (NY)	Suffolk (NY)
2013–14	Iowa Western	Mt. San Antonio (CA)	Herkimer (NY)	Iowa Central	Orange Coast (CA)
2014–15	Mt. San Antonio (CA)	Iowa Central	Herkimer (NY)	Nassau (NY)	Iowa Western
2015–16	Iowa Central	Suffolk (NY)	Rowan (NJ) (Note: Previously Gloucester County College)	Spokane (WA)	Mt. San Antonio (CA)
2016–17	Iowa Central	Spokane (WA)	Mt. San Antonio (CA)	Tyler (TX)	Riverside (CA)
2017–18	Iowa Central	Rowan (NJ)	Mt. San Antonio (CA)	Tyler (TX)	Herkimer (NY)
2018–19	Iowa Central	Suffolk (NY)	Barton (KS)	Mt. San Antonio (CA)	Spokane (WA)
2019–20	Not awarded because of the COVID-19 pandemic				
2020–21	Iowa Central	Iowa Western	Barton (KS)	Tyler (TX)	Cowley (KS)
2021–22	Iowa Western	Mt. San Antonio (CA)	Iowa Central	Barton (KS)	Rowan (NJ)
2022–23	DuPage (IL)	Rowan (NJ)	Mt. San Antonio (CA)	Iowa Western	Iowa Central
2023–24	Rowan (NJ)	Iowa Western	Mt. San Antonio (CA)	Barton (KS)	New Mexico JC
2024–25	Mt. San Antonio (CA)	Rowan (NJ)	Iowa Western	DuPage (IL)	Joliet
2025–26	Mt. San Antonio (CA)	Iowa Western	DuPage (IL)	Barton (KS)	Rowan (NJ)

College	Cup wins
Iowa Central	5
Mt. San Antonio (CA)	3
Iowa Western	2
Gloucester/Rowan (NJ)	2
Fresno (CA)	1
DuPage (IL)	1

== See also ==
- List of NCAA schools with the most NCAA Division I championships
- List of sport awards
- Capital One Cup
- NATYCAA Cup
