= Copa Sudamericana (trophy) =

Copa Sudamericana Trophy
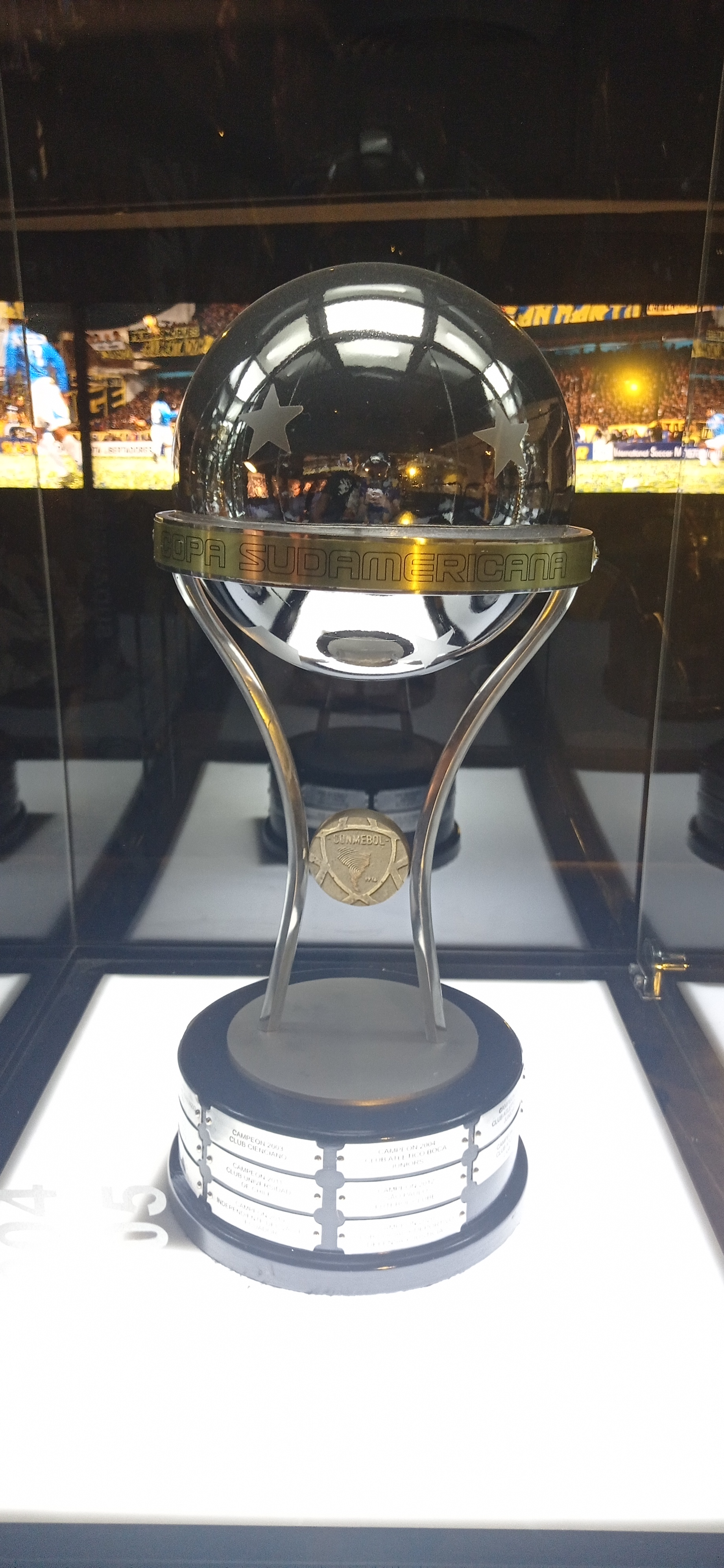
- Awarded for: Winning the Copa Sudamericana
- Presented by: CONMEBOL

History
- First award: 2002 (2023 in its current design)
- First winner: (Argentina) San Lorenzo
- Most wins: (Argentina) Boca Juniors; (Argentina) Independiente; (Brazil) Athletico Paranaense; (Ecuador) Independiente del Valle; (Ecuador) LDU Quito; (2 titles each)
- Most recent: (Argentina) Racing Club de Avellaneda (1)
- Website: conmebol.com

The Copa Sudamericana is a trophy of association football awarded annually by CONMEBOL to the club that wins the Copa Sudamericana; the competition shares its name with the trophy.

== Trophy ==
Winning clubs are also permitted to make exact replicas of their own. As well as winning the right to keep the trophy until the start of the next tournament, the winner gets to have a metal badge of silver placed on the pedestal of the trophy. The badge has the name of the winner and the year of the triumph. At the top of the cup, there is a silver ball with light-silver stars and pentagons. In the middle, the CONMEBOL logo is held together by two hoists, while the phrase "COPA SUDAMERICANA" can be read from the top.

The trophy carries room for 24 badges. The badges are placed at the top base of the pedestal one underneath another and span eight columns. The trophy is scheduled to be filled by the 2026 edition.

== Rules ==
The regulations for the Copa Sudamericana trophy follows very closely those of the Copa Libertadores trophy. The Copa Sudamericana winners keep the real trophy in their possession. It remains so until the draw and seeding of the next Copa Sudamericana begins. Before the proceedings happen, the club president of the defending champion returns the trophy to the president of CONMEBOL, and a replica trophy is awarded to the winning club.

== Winners ==
Club	Titles	Years won
(Ecuador) LDU Quito	2	2009, 2023
(Argentina) Boca Juniors	2	2004, 2005
(Argentina) Independiente	2	2010, 2017
(Brazil) Athletico Paranaense	2	2018, 2021
(Ecuador) Independiente del Valle	2	2019, 2022
(Brazil) São Paulo	1	2012
(Argentina) Lanús	1	2013
(Argentina) River Plate	1	2014
(Argentina) San Lorenzo	1	2002
(Peru) Cienciano	1	2003
(Mexico) Pachuca	1	2006
(Argentina) Arsenal	1	2007
(Brazil) Internacional	1	2008
Universidad de Chile	1	2011
(Colombia) Santa Fe	1	2015
(Brazil) Chapecoense	1	2016
(Argentina) Defensa y Justicia	1	2020
(Argentina) Racing	1	2024

== See also ==
- Copa Libertadores Trophy
