= Geraldton Gold Cup =

Unlisted Thoroughbred horse race

The Geraldton Cup is an unlisted Thoroughbred horse race, held at the Geraldton Racecourse, 435 km north of Perth, Western Australia. Hosted by the Geraldton Turf Club, the Gold Cup is raced over 2100m.

The Cup was first run on 8 December 1887 with a winner's purse of £300. The race staged over 3,200 metres was won by Baron Necktar, a full brother to Dunlop the Melbourne Cup winner of the same year. Baron Necktar travelled by steamer from Albany.

Alana Williams was the first female jockey to win the Cup in 2004 with Colorado Rover for Kim Anderson.

Tapdog, a gelding by Bletcharm, became the first horse to win the race three times with victories in 2002, 2006 and 2007.

The 2013 winner, Black Tycoon went on to win the 2013 Hyperion Stakes (Group 3), 2014 Perth Cup (Group 2) and listed Tattersal's Cup (Ascot).

== Recent results ==
Year	Date	Stake	Winner	Sex	Sire	Dam	Trainer(s)	Jockey	Time	Barrier	Second	Third
2025	Sunday 6 April	$125,000	Bambun Boy	G	Slater	Lakeview Elegance	Sue Olive	Brandon Louis	2:12.27	11	Royal Law	Fat Roy Slim
2024	Sunday 7 April	$125,000	What A Prince	G	All Too Hard	Shadow Card	Barry Newnham (Deepdale)	Chris Nicholl	2:11.80	1	Beats Of War	Gold Friars
2023	Sunday 16 April	$100,000	Come Right Back	G	Toronado (IRE)	Sense of Purpose	Adam Durrant (Karnup)	William Pike	2:13.26	7	Gold Friars	Sluice Box
2022	Sunday 10 April	$100,000	Sugar Cain	M	Americain	Mustang Sally	Grant Williams (Karnup)	Patrick Carbery	2:15.24	5	Off Wego	Black Money
2021	Sunday 18 April 2021	$99,000	Big Shot Paddy	G	Musket	Pause	John Reynolds	Chris Graham	2:11.21	8	Vintage Stock	Divine Shadow
2020	Sunday 19 April	$109,000	Freez'emoff	M	Frost Giant (USA)	Keep'emoff (NZ)	Graeme Hammarquist (Walkaway)	Kyra Yuill	2:12.43	10	Proxy	Defiantly
2019	Sunday 14 April	$109,000	Media Baron	G	Written Tycoon	Silentium	David Harrison (Serpentine)	Troy Turner	2:13.00	9	No Say In It	Freedom By Choice
2018	Sunday 15 April	$109,000	At The Ready	G	Myboycharlie (IRE)	She's Ready	Adam Durrant (Karnup)	Chris Parnham	2:11.57	6	Freedom by Choice	Three Generations
2017	2 April 2017	$100,000	Wayside	G	Choisir	Jeanetta Cochrane (IRE)	Robert Harvey	Shaun McGruddy	2:09.25	3	Falcon Crest	Freedom By Choice
2016	Sunday 10 April	$108,000	Preselection	M	Authorized (IRE)	Secret Women's Biz	Alan Mathews (Muchea)	Ellie Cockram	2:11.04	1	Paseo Del Prado	Who's to Blame
2015	22 March 2015	$90,000	Ora Dare	G	Oratorio	Brodrae	Adam Durrant	Peter Hall	2:10.45	1	Paseo Del Prado	Friarday.
2014	23 March	$80,000	Cyber Crime	G	Success Express (USA)	Stashed (NZ)	Alan Mathews	Patrick Carbery	2:10.58	6	Gold Broker	Desert Glow
2013.	7 April	$80,000	Black Tycoon	G	Blackfriars	Dame Fontaine	Justin Warwick	Troy Turner	2:08.86	7	Moonlight Bay	Hel Cool
2012	25 March	$80,000	Great'n'Grey	G	Verglas (IRE)	Impressario	Stephen Miller	Shaun Meeres	2:07.92	9	Hibernian	The Purple Parrot
2011	27 March	$80,000	I Don't Recall	G	Diatribe	Confidential Miss	Alan Matthews	Peter Knuckey	2:08.45	4	Rich Success	Amberlyn
2010	Sunday 28 March	$80,000	Calico Blue	M	Serheed (USA)	Royal Guilt	Rhona MacPhilomey	Mark Forder	2:08.80	8	Great Destiny	Our Katarina
2009	11 January	$80,000	Black Amber	M	Blackfriars	Amber Spree	Clive Lauritzen	Roy McKay	2:09.04 (2100m)	6	Terra Doro	Grey Monarch
2008	Sunday 13 January	$70,000	Riding On A Storm	G	Torrential (USA)	Faraway Places	Neil Sinclair	Peter Farrell	2:07.70	1	Solar Impact	Our Fuji Mak
2007	Sunday 14 January	$60,000	Tapdog	G	Bletcharm	Star Jazz (IRE)	Clive Lauritzen	Roy McKay	2:08.43	10	Kia Ora Miss	Storm Coast .
2006	15 January	$40,000	Tapdog	G	Bletcharm	Star Jazz (IRE)	Clive Lauritzen	Roy McKay	2:07.58	10	Kontiki Sir	Solar Impact
2005	January 16	$30,000	Elvis Rules	G	Tenby (GB)	Jubilee Joy (AUS)	Tom Brown	Shaun McGruddy	2:07.58	1	Colins Street	Polish Raider
2004	Sunday 18 January	$30,000	Colorado River	G	River Rough (NZ)	Lady Be Mine	Kim Anderson	Alana Williams	2:03.02 (2000m)	4	Special Clearance	Alibi Bay
2003	Sunday 19 January	$28,000	Robe River Man	G	Metal Storm (Fra)	Al Hindar	Brian Keys	Roy McKay	2:02.38 (2000m)	10	Latest Sovereign	Big Bank
2002	Sunday 14 April	$25,000	Tapdog	G	Bletcharm	Star Jazz (IRE)	Clive Lauritzen	Chris Usher	2:08.65 (2100m)	7	Sir Donald	Scene Dream
2001	Saturday 21 April	$25,000	Sir Donald	G	Rubiton	Etoile D'Or (NZ)	Garry Delane	Daniel Staeck	2:20.04 (2200m, Ascot)	1	Sea Gambler	Dynaliebe

== Past winners ==
Year	Winner	Notes
2000	Interest Free	
1999	Mount Henry	
1998	Boston Blue	
1997	Clan West	
1996	The Walrus	
1995	Pago Music	
1994	The Walrus	
1993	Pago Magic	
1992	Top Voltage	
1991	Mr. Geraldton	
1990	Great Fellow	
1989	Brazen Face	
1987	Stylish Lord	
1986	Calingiri Cityv	
1985	Mick's Lad	
1984	Star Warning	
1983	Stock Market	
1982	Outcome	
1981	Russian Robert	
1980	Kens Marty	
1979	Jimadaw	
1978	Under Control	
1977	Racaralma	Trainer: Clive Lauritzen.
1976	Sun City Boy	
1975	Royal Hand.	Trainer: Clive Lauritzen.
1974	Royal Hand.	Trainer: Clive Lauritzen.
1973	Yalbra Lass	
1972	Hecoelse	
1971	Hecoelse	
1970	Tribal Warrior	
1969	Degray Boy	
HACK RACING ENDS
1968	Golden Spur	
1967	Top Hat	
1966	Alight	
1965	Red Warrior	
1964	Watersan	
1963	Sahara Desert	Max Ramsay, was the first rider to win successive cups after winning with Sahara Desert and Solerial
1962	Solerial	
1961	Omega	
1960	Beau Cunje	
1959	Buttarabby	
1958	Mica Hill	
1957	Heather Law	
1956	King David	
1955	Dream Star	
1954	Near Me	
1953	Dark Magic	
1952	Firestone	
1951	Waitabit	
1950	Shocking	
1949	Bundear	Harry Miller owner
1948	Gay Shock	
1947	Tamala Lass	
1946	Bright Gleam	
1945	High Star	
1944	Marega	
HACK RACING CONDITIONS COMMENCE
1940-1943		NO CUPS DUE TO WW2
1939	His Best	
1938	Cattle Chosen	
1937	Day Stream	
1936	Meteoru	
1935		NO GERALDTON CUP RAN
1934	Greek Key	
1933	Whiddon	
1932	Green Hills	
1931	Bombadu	
1930	Ayrville Green	
1929	Darenth	
1928	Cap	
1927	Cap	
1926		NO GERALDTON CUP DUE TO CHANGE OF DATES
1925	Rosy Red	
1924	Maupeon	
1923	Maupeon	
1922	Ayrton	
1921	Channel Fleet	
1920	Solifinhar	
1919	Wax Palm	
1915-1918		NO CUPS DUE TO WW1
1914	Mural Boy	
1913	Keer Weer	
1912	Marksman	
1911	Muralite	
1910	Prominence	
1909	Durrwitt; Calstock	Dead heat. F.Coleman was the second person to own, train and ride the cup winner
1908	Gold Streak	
1907	Bundaleer	
1906	Wallace Park	
1905	Radium	
1904	Coronation	
1903	Fair Sex	
1902	Orphan Boy	
1901	Aqua	
1900	Asteroid	
1899	First Mate	
1898	Casina	
1897	Golden King	
1863	Purser	
1895	Sunbeam	
1894	Carbine	George Towton was the first to own, train and ride the cup winner
1893	Durable	
1892	Pilgrim	
1891	Lord Byron	
1890	Lottery	
1889	Wandering Willie	Also won the Perth Cup, Railway Stakes and Queen’s Plate
1888	Aim Ford	
1887	Baron Nectar	
