= Baseball Hall of Fame (disambiguation) =

The National Baseball Hall of Fame and Museum is a museum and hall of fame in Cooperstown, New York, United States.

Baseball Hall of Fame may also refer to:

- Baseball Australia Hall of Fame
- Canadian Baseball Hall of Fame
- Caribbean Baseball Hall of Fame
- Cuban Baseball Hall of Fame
- Hispanic Heritage Baseball Museum Hall of Fame
- Japanese Baseball Hall of Fame
- Mexican Professional Baseball Hall of Fame
- National College Baseball Hall of Fame
- Venezuelan Baseball Hall of Fame and Museum

== See also ==
- Meikyukai (The Golden Players Club), honoring players of the Japanese professional leagues from 1926 and onward
- Negro Leagues Baseball Museum, dedicated to preserving the history of Negro league baseball in the United States
