= Cronulla-Sutherland Sharks Honours =

== Premierships (1/50) ==
Year	Opponent	Competition	Score
2016	Melbourne Storm	NRL	14-12

The Sharks have only won one Grand Final.

== Runners-up (3/50) ==
Year	Opponent	Competition	Score
1973	Manly-Warringah Sea Eagles	NSWRL	7-10
1978	Manly-Warringah Sea Eagles	NSWRL	11-11
1978 replay	Manly-Warringah Sea Eagles	NSWRL	0-16
1997	Brisbane Broncos	SL	8-26

== Minor Premierships (2/50) ==
Year	Competition	Wins
1988	NSWRL	16 (plus 2 draws)
1999	NRL	18

== Wooden Spoons (3/50) ==
- 1967 Wooden Spoon
- 1969 Wooden Spoon
- 2014 Wooden Spoon

== Finals Appearances ==
2000, 2001, 2002, 2005, 2008, 2012, 2013, 2015, 2016.
