= South Sydney Rabbitohs competition honours =

The following is a list of titles that the South Sydney Rabbitohs have won. The premiership victories represent finals and grand finals won to decide the premier for the particular season. As minor premiers in 1914, 1918 and 1925, Souths were declared premiers under the "first past the post" system.

== Premierships (21) ==
Year	Opponent	Score	Ground	Attendance
1908	Eastern Suburbs	14 - 12	Sydney Showground	4,000
1909	Balmain^{1}			
1914	Minor Premiers^{2}			
1918	Minor Premiers^{2}			
1925^{3}	Minor Premiers^{2} ^{4}			
1926	University	11 - 5	Sydney Showground	20,000
1927	St George	20 - 11	Sydney Showground	8,000
1928	Eastern Suburbs	26 - 5	Sydney Showground	25,000
1929	Newtown	30 - 10	Sports Ground	16,360
1931	Eastern Suburbs	12 - 7	Sports Ground	27,104
1932	Western Suburbs	19 - 12	Sports Ground	16,925
1950	Western Suburbs	21 - 15	Sports Ground	32,373
1951	Manly Warringah	42 - 14	Sports Ground	28,505
1953	St George	31 - 12	Sydney Cricket Ground	44,581
1954	Newtown	23 - 15	Sydney Cricket Ground	45,759
1955	Newtown	12 - 11	Sydney Cricket Ground	42,466
1967	Canterbury	12 - 10	Sydney Cricket Ground	56,358
1968	Manly Warringah	13 - 9	Sydney Cricket Ground	54,255
1970	Manly Warringah	23 - 12	Sydney Cricket Ground	53,241
1971	St George	16 - 10	Sydney Cricket Ground	62,838
2014	Canterbury	30 - 6	Stadium Australia	83,833

^{1} Balmain forfeited.

^{2} As minor premiers Souths were declared premiers under the "first past the post" system.

^{3} Undefeated during season.

^{4} Premiers in all 3 grades.

== First Grade Runners-up (14) ==
- 1910, 1916, 1917, 1920, 1923, 1924, 1935, 1937, 1939, 1949, 1952, 1965, 1969, 2021

== Minor Premiers J. J. Giltinan Shield (17) ==
- 1908, 1909, 1914, 1918, 1925, 1926, 1927, 1929, 1932, 1949, 1950, 1951, 1953, 1968, 1969, 1970, 1989

== Club Championships (9) ==
- 1932, 1933, 1952, 1953, 1954, 1967, 1968, 1969, 1989

== Tooth Cup Titles (1) ==
- 1981

== Tooheys Challenge Cup Titles (1) ==
- 1994

== World Sevens Titles (1) ==
- 1988

== City Cup Titles (4) ==
- 1912, 1921, 1924, 1925

== City Cup Runners-Up (2) ==
1914, 1917

== Sports Ground Cup Titles (3) ==
1914, 1915, 1916 – won outright.

== League Cup Titles (5) ==
- 1916, 1917, 1918, 1919, 1922

== NRL Auckland Nines Titles (1) ==
- 2015

== Pre-Season Cup Titles (5) ==
1966, 1969, 1972, 1978, 1994

== Mid-week Knockout Cup Titles (1) ==
- 1981 Tooth Cup

== State Championship Titles (2) ==
- 1932,2023

== World Sevens Titles (1) ==
- 1988

== NSWRL Women's Premiership Runners-Up (1) ==
- 2018

== NSWRL Women's Premiership Minor Premiers (1) ==
- 2018

== Charity Shield (22) ==
- 1984, 1988, 1989, 1990, 1991, 1992, 1999, 2002, 2005, 2006, 2008, 2009, 2010, 2013, 2014, 2015, 2016, 2017, 2018, 2019, 2020, 2021

== Second Grade Titles (21) ==
- 1913, 1914, 1917, 1923, 1924, 1925, 1926, 1927, 1929, 1931, 1932, 1934, 1943, 1945, 1952, 1953, 1956, 1966, 1968, 1983, 2023

== Third Grade Titles (10) ==
- 1912, 1918, 1925, 1928, 1933, 1962, 1969, 1981, 1986, 1989

== Munn Cup (3) ==
1908, 1909, 1910 – won outright.

== President’s Cup (20) ==
1936, 1942, 1943, 1951, 1953, 1960, 1961, 1962, 1963, 1964, 1965, 1968, 1969, 1971, 1972, 1974, 1977, 1980, 1982, 1983

== Jersey Flegg Cup (9) ==
- 1962, 1964, 1966, 1967, 1968, 1969, 1972, 1978, 2019

== S.G. Ball Cup (10) ==
1965, 1969, 1974, 1975, 1976, 1979, 1980, 1986, 1994, 1998

== Harold Matthews Cup (1) ==
1974

== Junior Club Championship (1) ==
1986

== Lennox Cup (1) ==
1948
