= Copa Libertadores (trophy) =

South American club football trophy

Copa Libertadores Trophy
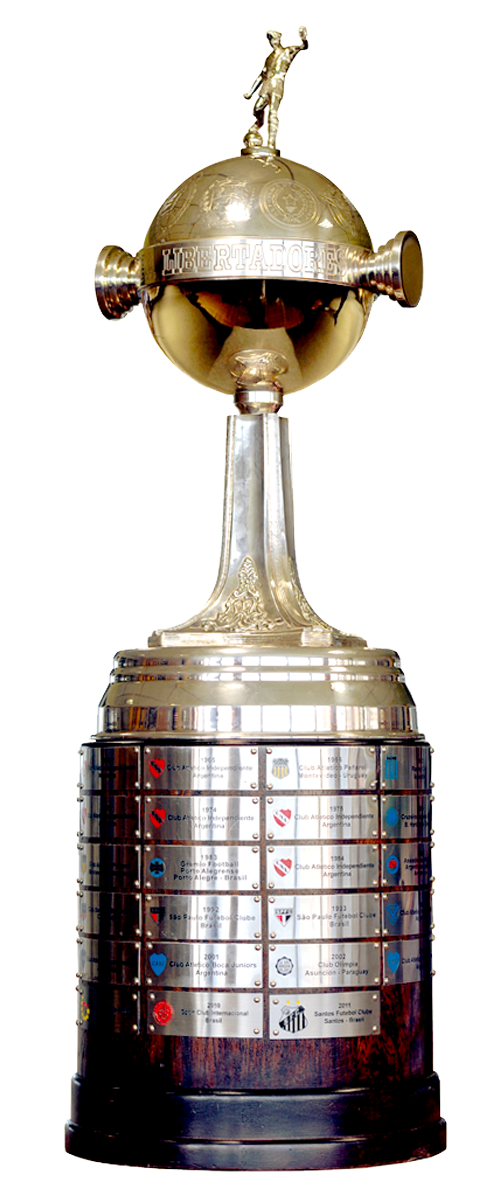
- Awarded for: Winning the Copa Libertadores
- Presented by: CONMEBOL

History
- First award: 1960 (2024 in its current design)
- First winner: (Uruguay) Peñarol (original trophy, 1960); (Brazil) Flamengo (current trophy, 2025)
- Most wins: (Argentina) Independiente (7)
- Most recent: (Brazil) Flamengo (4)
- Website: conmebol.com

The Copa Libertadores trophy, or simply Copa Libertadores, is a trophy awarded annually by CONMEBOL to the football club that wins the Copa Libertadores. Since the creation of the Copa Libertadores in 1960, several different trophies have been used, with the rule that the team that won the tournament three times in a row could keep the original trophy.

== Trophy ==
The concept of having a standard Cup awarded to the winner was thought of by Teófilo Salinas, a board member of CONMEBOL, and it was his initiative that led to the creation of one of the most prized awards of the world. The original trophy was created in 1959 by Alberto de Gasperi, an Italian immigrant, who owned an artisan shop in Lima, Peru; the prestigious memento was forged in the Camusso Jewelry workshop, located on Colonial Avenue of the same aforementioned city. Gasperi later commented:

He gave us an idea, we did a drawing, rejected. Did another design, approved. What took the longest time was the approval. Whenever he didn’t like a model we had to start from scratch. As we say in our jewelry shop’s jargon, we had to "pagar el ojo." When Salinas saw the final result he was delighted.

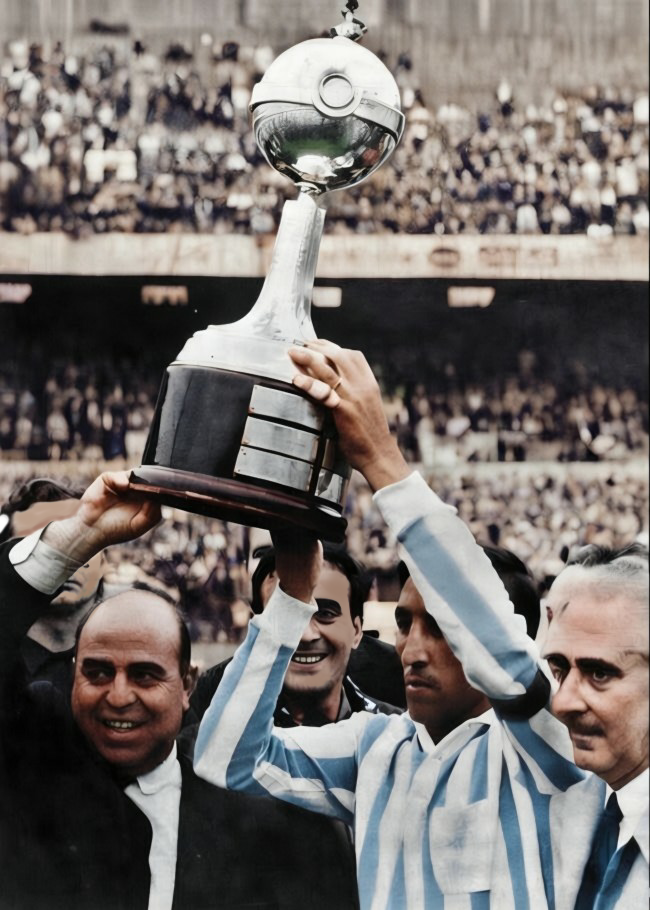
Racing Club, the first champion with the pedestal

The original trophy carried room for a mere 18 badges (perhaps as a sign of the little faith its organizers had on the duration of the tournament). The top of the laurel is made of sterling silver, with the exception of the football player at the top (it is made of bronze with a silver coating). The pedestal, which contains badges from every winner of the competition, is made of hardwood plywood. The badges would be placed at the top base of the pedestal one underneath another and span six columns. At the top of the cup, there is a football player getting ready to kick a ball. The top half of the globe beneath him carries the coat of arms of every CONMEBOL nation. The middle bar has "Copa Libertadores" inscribed on it. On one side of the lower half of the globe is a contour map of South America and inside the inscription CSF (initials of Confederación Suramericana de Fútbol, the official name of CONMEBOL). There are two handles on each side of the globe. The non-wooden part of the laurel is made of sterling silver, with the exception of the football player at the top (it is made of bronze with a silver coating).

Estudiantes won the right to win the first trophy outright after their third, consecutive win in 1970. The pedestal was placed on the new top portion of the trophy which shared similar characteristics to the first one. A third switch was implemented in 1974 after Independiente's triumph. This time, the middle bar has "Copa Libertadores" inscribed on it. Eighteen editions after its inauguration, the pedestal was filled to capacity and a new pedestal that carried room for 24 badges was installed. The old badges were installed on the new pedestal and the Cup carried room for six more editions. After six years the pedestal was full and a new stand was installed. This new pedestal had room for 28 badges and it was designed to have seven columns of four. A quick solution practiced after the 28 slots were occupied was to put their badges on the bottom edge of the pedestal. The first team to do this was Atlético Nacional.

Although the edge of the pedestal was filled in 1994, the pedestal stayed the same size until 2004. The Copa Libertadores debuted with a new pedestal, and with space for several champions and with all its badges in place. But this was short lived due to an accident in the celebrations of the consecration of Once Caldas in July 2004, after beating defending champions Boca Juniors. This issue was highlighted when the old trophy ended shattered when Herly Alcazar, who plays for Once Caldas, let the trophy fell from his hands. Repair was entrusted to Chilean company Alzaimagen. Among the differences from the current to the original is that the handles are larger, and the man kicks with his left foot and not with his right.

In 2009, the trophy went through a major renovation as the badges were organized to have nine horizontal columns with vertical rows. The first team to receive the current trophy was Estudiantes. The trophy is scheduled to be filled by the 2024 edition.

== Rules ==
Copa Libertadores winners keep the real trophy in their possession. It remains so until the draw and seeding of the next Copa Libertadores begins. Before the proceedings happen, the club president of the defending champion will return the trophy to the president of CONMEBOL and a replica trophy is awarded to the winning club. Winning clubs are also permitted to make exact replicas of their own. A club gets to keep the trophy indefinitely if they win three consecutive tournaments.

As well as winning the right to keep the trophy until the start of the next tournament, the winner gets to have a metal badge of gold or silver placed on the wooden pedestal of the trophy. The badge has the name of the winner and the year of the triumph.

== Badges ==
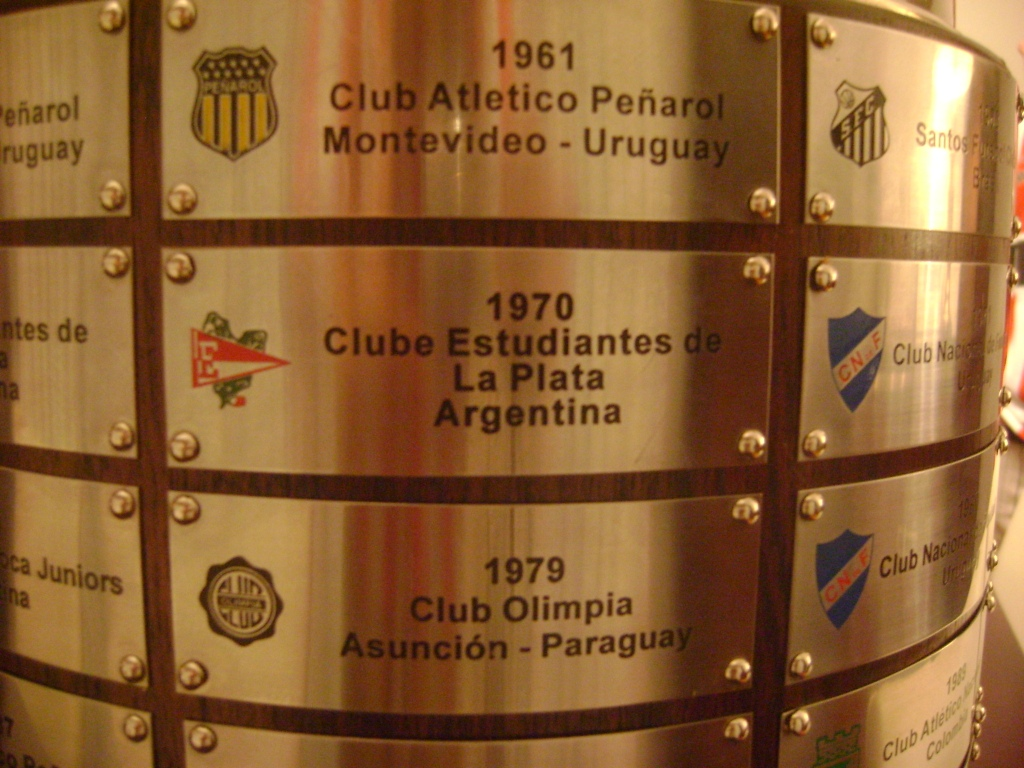
Every winner of the Copa Libertadores has its badge on the trophy's pedestal, commemorating the team and edition won

The metal badge was added to the Cup in order to commemorate past winners of the title. The former badge contained the year at the top and the club name and nation of the winners side by side, e.g., "1960, Peñarol, (URU)". The rebranded badge (since 2009) contains the year of the triumph, the full name of the winning club, and the hometown and home country of the winning club. To the left of that information is the club's logo.

== Salver ==
A separate "award" was given by Toyota Motor Corporation to the eventual Copa Libertadores champions in the trophy ceremony. A golden salver was introduced in 1998 by Toyota since the competition was primarily sponsored by Toyota Motor Corporation from 1998 to 2008; thus, the competition was known as the Copa Toyota Libertadores. The golden salver contained the competition logo in the middle, "CAMPEON X" at the top (the X representing the edition won) and the logo of Toyota and the word "TOYOTA" at the bottom. Since Toyota stopped being the primary sponsor of the Copa Libertadores, no salver has been awarded to the champions.

== Winners ==
Two clubs have kept the actual trophy after three consecutive wins:

- (Argentina) Estudiantes de La Plata after their third consecutive win in 1970. They won a fourth title in 2009.
- (Argentina) Independiente after their third consecutive win, and fifth overall, in 1974. They have since won two more titles, in 1975 and 1984.

Independiente is the only club to have held all three trophies at some point in time.

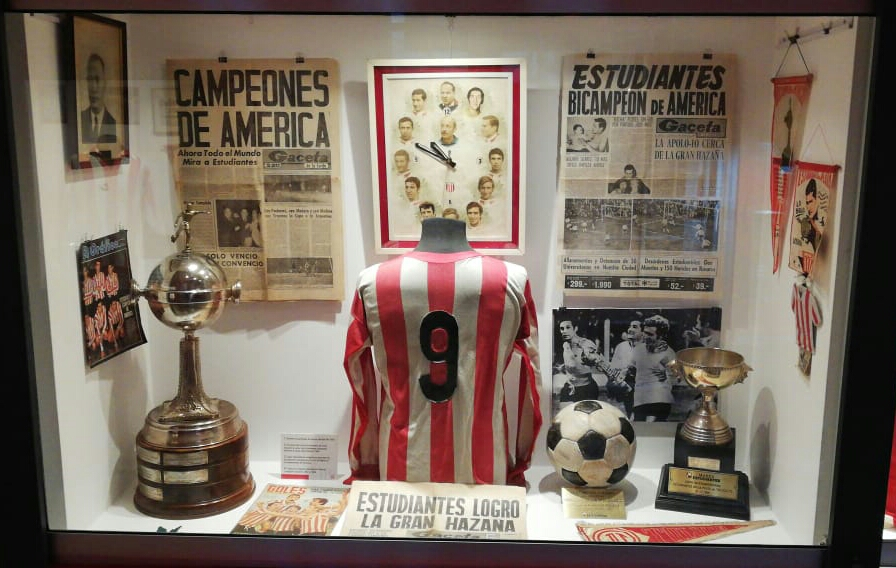
The original trophy exhibited at the Estudiantes de La Plata Museum

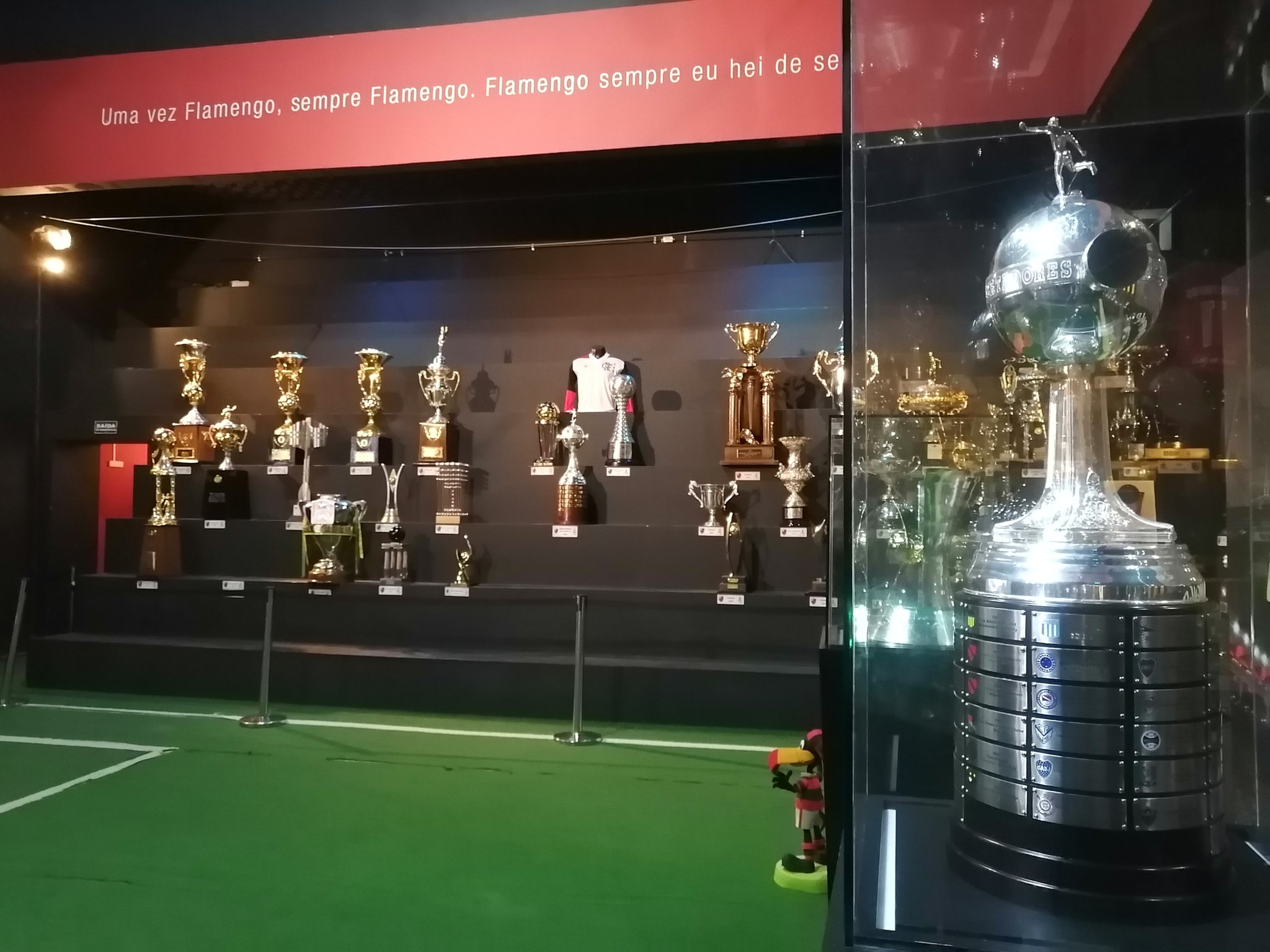
The third trophy won by Flamengo in 2019 exhibited in Rio de Janeiro

List of winners of the original Copa Libertadores trophy (1960–1970)
Club	Titles	Years won
(Uruguay) Peñarol	3	1960, 1961, 1966
(Argentina) Estudiantes LP	3	1968, 1969, 1970
(Brazil) Santos	2	1962, 1963
(Argentina) Independiente	2	1964, 1965
(Argentina) Racing	1	1967

List of winners of the second Copa Libertadores trophy (1971–1974)
Club	Titles	Years won
(Argentina) Independiente	3	1972, 1973, 1974
(Uruguay) Nacional	1	1971

List of winners of the current Copa Libertadores trophy (1975–present)
Club	Titles	Years won
(Argentina) Boca Juniors	6	1977, 1978, 2000, 2001, 2003, 2007
(Argentina) River Plate	4	1986, 1996, 2015, 2018
(Paraguay) Olimpia	3	1979, 1990, 2002
(Brazil) São Paulo	3	1992, 1993, 2005
(Brazil) Grêmio	3	1983, 1995, 2017
(Brazil) Palmeiras	3	1999, 2020, 2021
(Brazil) Flamengo	4	1981, 2019, 2022, 2025
(Argentina) Independiente	2	1975, 1984
(Brazil) Cruzeiro	2	1976, 1997
(Uruguay) Nacional	2	1980, 1988
(Uruguay) Peñarol	2	1982, 1987
(Colombia) Atlético Nacional	2	1989, 2016
(Brazil) Internacional	2	2006, 2010
(Argentina) Argentinos Juniors	1	1985
(Chile) Colo-Colo	1	1991
(Argentina) Vélez Sársfield	1	1994
(Brazil) Vasco da Gama	1	1998
(Colombia) Once Caldas	1	2004
(Ecuador) LDU Quito	1	2008
(Argentina) Estudiantes LP	1	2009
(Brazil) Santos	1	2011
(Brazil) Corinthians	1	2012
(Brazil) Atlético Mineiro	1	2013
(Argentina) San Lorenzo	1	2014
(Brazil) Fluminense	1	2023
(Brazil) Botafogo	1	2024

== See also ==
- Copa Sudamericana Trophy
